= Barlow, Pennsylvania =

Unincorporated community in Pennsylvania, US

Barlow, Pennsylvania Horner's Mill Black's Mill
- Unincorporated community
- Interactive map of Barlow, Pennsylvania
- Coordinates: 39.756682°N 77.231199°W
- Country: United States
- State: Pennsylvania
- County: Adams
- Townships: Cumberland
- Post Office: 1890-1911
- Time zone: UTC-5 (EST)
  - Summer (DST): UTC-4 (EDT)
- ZIP Code: 17325
- Area code: 717

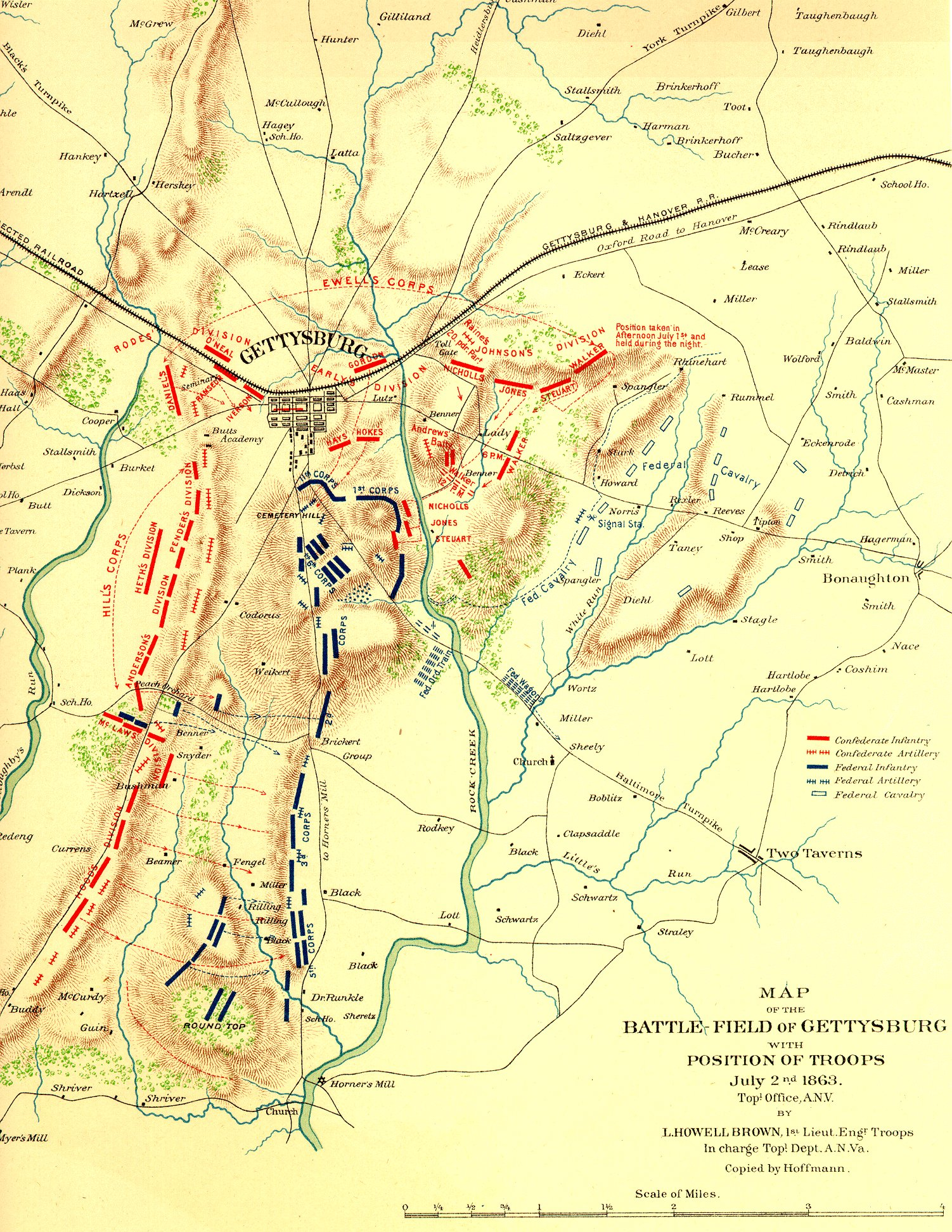
CSA civil war map with exaggerated creek width at Horner's Mill (Big Round Top is on wrong side of Plum R). "Church" is the nearby Rock Creek Chapel.

External videos
- Eisenhower voting in 1958

Barlow (Horner's Mill during the Civil War) is a populated place between the Gettysburg Battlefield and the Mason–Dixon line in Adams County, Pennsylvania, United States, situated at the intersection of Rock Creek and Pennsylvania Route 134. North of the creek on the road summit is the principal facility of the rural community: the 1939 community hall at the Barlow Volunteer Fire Company fire station. The hall is a Cumberland Township polling place and was used by Mamie and Dwight D. Eisenhower after purchasing their nearby farm (President Eisenhower became an honorary company member in 1955). Horner's Mill was the site of an 1861 Union Civil War encampment, and the covered bridge was used by the II Corps and General George G. Meade en route to the 1863 Battle of Gettysburg.

Barlow is located near the U.S. Route 15 interchange to the north and has three Taneytown Rd intersections, with the Barlow-Greenmount, Barlow, and Barlow-Two Taverns roads. South of the community is a site listed on the National Register of Historic Places (Spangler-Benner Farm) near the Mount Joy Lutheran Church and cemetery. The neighboring communities of Barlow are Greenmount 2.9 mi to the west, Round Top 3.3 mi to the north, Two Taverns 5.1 mi to the east, Harney, Maryland 3.1 mi to the south, and Fairplay 3.2 miles to the southwest.

Geographic Chronology
Date	Topic	Event	Coordinates
1738-03		Robert Black settled in a disputed Calvert/Penn area of 72 sq mi (190 km^{2}) which in 1740 the "Penn coterie" named "The Manor of Maske". In 1763, the Mason-Dixon survey placed a marker near the confluence of Rock Creek and Marsh Creek, south of the subsequent site for Robert Black's mill. A Black's Cemetery 1760 gravestone identified Robert Black's death (the heirs made a 1792 property claim). In 1762, a Robert Black remained in each of Cumberland and Mt Joy townships.	39.7217°N 77.220728°W
1787-01	mill	"Robert Black of Mount Joy Township has built a merchant mill with undershot water wheel on the waters of Rock Creek and wants a road from the mill to John Little's"	39.756505°N 77.230156°W
1799	mill	The "Henry Black, miller", property assessment was $756 after the 1799 death of Robert Black (in 1838, the was Henry's son, Robert Black).	
1808	PA 134	The Adams County court approved a road from Gettysburg to Maryland past Black's Mill at the end of the road from Little's.	
1821	mill	The map symbol (waterwheel) for the "Black" mill on the south bank of "Rock c." was depicted on the west side of the road between Gettysburg and Taneytown.	
1825-06-26	mill	Flooding carried away part of the dam at Black's Mill, which became George W. Horner's, 1838–49, and Silas Miles Horner's, 1849-1890. In June 1826, a Shippensburg wagon team died after being swept from the fording at Black's mill.	39.758672°N 77.226017°W
1828-04-30	mill	"Black's Mill, Rock Creek" accepted wool for John Arnold and on June 25, 1828, for the Rochdale Wollen [sic] Factory. Later at "Black's Mill, on Rock-creek" on May 6, 1833, wool was accepted for the "Middle-Creek factory". In 1863, "Andre McKinney's, near Black's Mill" collected wool for the Rochdale factory.	
1841	bridge	John Camp built a covered bridge of two 60-foot spans downstream of the Black's Mill dam for the road between Gettysburg and Taneytown, Maryland.	39.756866°N 77.231441°W
1858	mill	The "S Horner Saw & Grist Mill" was depicted on a mapped island of Rock Creek near the "N M Horner" and "S M Horner" dwellings.	
1858	school	Willow Grove school was depicted on the southeast corner of the Taneytown Rd crossing over Plum Run ("Dr. J. Runkle" property) after previously opening upstream along Plum Run "on the Theodore McCallister property", then moving to Lott Road (now Soloman Rd) on the Harry Black farm.	39.764424°N 77.231848°W
1861-05-06	Civil War	Captain Stoneman's four companies of cavalry from Carlisle Barracks encamped at Horner's Mill	
1863-07-01	Civil War	General Howard's 2 divisions: "my Third, General Schurz, and my Second, General Steinwehr, in the order named, taking the route by Horner's Mill" to Gettysburg. The detour used a Marsh Creek fording and passed Myer's Mill, Rock Creek Chapel, and Horners Mill; which the Third Division passed at 10:30 a.m. In 1947, an XI Corps marker was placed on the Taneytown Rd's east side south of the Barlow-Greenmount Rd and after the marker had been lost, it was replaced on the west in late July 2008 at the Barlow fire hall.	39.762177°N 77.232382°W
1863-07-01	Civil War	Winfield Scott Hancock's troops from Taneytown used the nearby fording downstream of Horner's Mill, as well as the covered bridge, to arrive at Gettysburg ~3 pm.	39.753884°N 77.232682°W
1863-07-01	Civil War	At night, General Meade crossed the Horner's Mill covered bridge en route to Gettysburg after Hancock had returned via Horner's Mill to brief Meade at Taneytown.	
1863-07-02	Civil War	The II Corps (Union Army) departed from a bivouac near Horner's Mill to arrive at Cemetery Ridge at 7 a.m.	
1863-07-03	Civil War	General Farnsworth's Union cavalry watered their horses near the Horner's Mill covered bridge prior to Wells' charge on South Cavalry Field.	
1863-07-06	Civil War	At 4:15 a.m. General Howard at Horner's recommended the XI Corps maneuver to Emmitsburg.	
1863-07-07	Civil War	The XII Corps (Union Army) left the Gettysburg Battlefield via Horner's Mill on orders to go to Frederick, Maryland, via Taneytown.	
1871-04-18	bridge	A contract was issued for restoring the Horner's Mill covered bridge to higher piers after it was "swept away by a flood…half a mile" downstream.	
1879	mill	Bids were solicited for carrying the mail via Horner's Mill between Gettysburg and Harney, Maryland.	
1881-03-03		The stone home near the mill was sold by Newton M. Horner to J. Gibson Walker, and subsequent transfers were to Charles Hartman (1913), John Adams (1919), John Dietrick (1922), Lloyd Dubbs (1924), Samuel Gault Weaver (1925), and George & Elsie Geiselman (1930).	39.756395°N 77.228479°W
1885	store	Josephus Mills opened a general store in part of his home near Horner's Mill (former "S M Horner" dwelling on west of Taneytown Rd/Horner's Mill Rd intersection.).	
1886-02-12	mill	The Horner's Mill dam breached during a flood and ~165 ft (50 m) of the breast was carried away.	
1887	PA 134	The low truss iron bridge over Plum Run was contracted (superstructure contract to Gilbert & Smith foundry, stone work to Nelson Collins).	39.765039°N 77.231998°W
1889-06-06	bridge	Flooding further damaged the Horner's Mill covered bridge, which had center pier damage from the 1886 flood, but the "Grand Jury refused to approve a bridge".	
1890-12-20	store	The Barlow Post Office began in the Josephus Mills store with David H. Sterner carrying the mail to/from the Sedgwick Post Office at Round Top.	
1892-08-02	mill	Silas Mc. Horner offered for sale the "MILL BUILDING, first story of stone and upper stories of frame … adjoining lands of … Josephus Mills and Mills's [sic] store".	
1897	store	The "smaller house which contained a store operated by Josephus Mills" was replaced by Abner S. Mills, who ran the store in the new house until 1911. The subsequent operator and his wife, "John W. Black and Emma S. Black", sold the store to "J. Carna Smith" in July 1914 (deeded on March 29, 1915).	39.755802°N 77.229123°W
1900-01-22		Barlow had a population of ~43 with 10 dwellings plus the school, a steam chopping mill, 2 ice houses, "and an ice cream manufactory … famous for the celebrated Barlow ice cream." The 1828 Rock Creek Chapel (Methodist Episcopal Church) and 1852 Mount Joy Lutheran Church were "both a quarter mile [sic]" from Barlow.	
1909-05-04	organization	The Barlow Rural Telephone Company's party line was completed. After 1954 "phantom voices", the group ended in 1957 when replaced by private lines.	
1921-08-24	organization	The Barlow Community Association's 1st picnic was at the nearby Shriver's Grove. Later annual picnics were held at Benner's Grove south of Barlow (called off c. 1941).	39.763059°N 77.243028°W
1923-04-01	organization	The Barlow Community Milk Association was formed to consolidate exports from Adams County.	
1923-04-20	bridge	"Barlow Bridge No. 27" was contracted for concrete to increase the road width to 20 feet from 16. In 1921 the Taneytown Rd from Gettysburg was paved only 3 miles.	
1923-08-30	bridge	The upstream temporary bridge flooded into the unfinished new bridge, flooding 2 hogs and 20 beehives from the miller's house and floating pies from the kitchen oven.	39.756082°N 77.22996°W
1927	organization	The Barlow "Pig Club" was formed, and in 1932 the Barlow Home Economics Club organized.	
1929	school	After having moved to the road's west side, Willow Grove school was used for February–April services during Mt. Joy church renovations.	39.764144°N 77.232194°W
1929	store	James Carnahan Smith closed the "Barlow General Store" (goods auctioned 1939, building rented 1940, sold 1944, & had 1953 fire.)	
1929	store	Clarence E. "Jumbo" Fair opened a new general store at the Barlow creamery on the creek's north bank, which was later operated by Bill Mellott, Tom Reed (1947–50), John & Ruth Witherow (1955-), Leroy DeGroft (1963), John & Romaine Maring (1964–70, Maring's Grocery), and Homer Brown (1970–1974, Brown's Grocery).	39.757354°N 77.231585°W
1930	PA 134	The Taneytown Rd's eastward curve from Rock Creek to the end of Chapel Rd was straightened to an elevated meadow roadbed built using excavation from the hill adjacent to the south. The roadway was moved westward from along the miller's log house and the former Barlow store, bypassing a hill and small run crossing.	39.753519°N 77.227361°W
1931-02-10	fire co.	The Barlow Volunteer Fire Company organized at Fair's store, where a fire bell alerted volunteer firemen until a siren became available. The first fire call was to the J. F. Jacobs wash house on April 8, and the company held an ox roast at the Chester Shriver's grove on October 10, 1931.	39°45′44″N 77°13′56″W
1934	road	Horner's Mill Rd (now Barlow-Two Taverns Rd, Hoffman Orphanage Rd in 1953) was rerouted by the WPA at Barlow from the hill along the mill's stone farmhouse to the south several yards into the excavated side of the hill along a run, just east of its intersection with the Taneytown Rd between the mill property and the former Barlow store property.	
1934-09	fire co.	After an equipment demonstration at Rock Creek during the Adams County Fireman's Association meeting, the companies paraded to Benner's Grove.	
1937	mill	The mill dam was rebuilt slightly upstream by the Adams County Fish and Game Association with help from the WPA, but a fallen tree breached the dam within 2 years.	
1939	organization	The Barlow 4-H club organized at Horner's school house, and a 1948 committee was formed to name the club ("Barlow Snackers" name created in 1952).	39.754589°N 77.205917°W
c. 1940	organization	The Barlow Baseball Club of the county Junior Baseball League (Southern Pennsylvania Baseball league by 1947) built a field with backstop to the west of the 1939 fire hall. The team made the playoffs in 1941, and in 1943 Chester Shriver Jr. was cited by Wid Matthews of the Brooklyn Dodgers as a post-war prospect.	39.762321°N 77.233983°W
1947	school	Willow Grove schoolhouse was sold as was the Centennial Hall/Green Bush school. southwest of Barlow on the "Barlow-Natural Dam road".	
1989	bridge	The wider bridge to replace the 1923 bridge included a PENNDoT survey marker on the top of the south abutment's upstream side.	
2008-08-04	fire co.	The Barlow fire service area was increased to include a portion of the defunct Kingsdale Fire Company area at Maryland Line Road.	
c. 2009		One of the 10 Barlow dwellings of 1900 was demolished at 1998 Taneytown Rd after a fire several years earlier.	
2011-05-21	fire co.	The fire company held the first bi-annual community day to replace the former 3-day July carnival.	
