= White Run (Rock Creek tributary) =

Coordinates: 39°47′04″N 77°12′20″W

Location
- Country: United States
- State: Pennsylvania
- Region: Adams County

White Run is a Pennsylvania stream which flows along the Gettysburg National Military Park (East Cavalry Field) and is an eponym of the Rock Creek-White Run hospital complex for field hospitals of the Battle of Gettysburg. The run's mouth is at Rock Creek near the Trostle Farm along the Sachs Road, site of a hospital east of Round Top, Pennsylvania.

== Tributaries ==
- Blocher's Run
- Guinn Run
- Plum Run
- Spangler Spring Run
- Stevens Run
- Winebrenner Run
