= Harney, Maryland =

Unincorporated community in Maryland, United States

- Unincorporated community
- Location within the state of Maryland Harney (the United States)
- Coordinates: 39°42′50″N 77°12′24″W
- Country: United States
- State: Maryland
- County: Caroll
- Time zone: UTC-5 (Eastern (EST))
  - Summer (DST): UTC-4 (EDT)

Harney (Monocacyville as late as 1892) is an unincorporated community in Carroll County, Maryland, United States. Harney is also the home of the 'World's Best Carnival'. It has been the home of the Harney Volunteer Fire Company since 1951.

== Geography ==
Harney is located near the head of the Monocacy River to the northwest and is the site of the following crossroads: east/west Conover Road (named for a family who owned a defunct farm on the east of the town) and north/south Harney Road. Additional intersections at the ball field are Bowers Road, off Conover Road, and Baptist Road heads southwest from just south of the crossroads. Communities near Harney are Longville to the south, Emmitsburg (southwest) and in Pennsylvania, Natural Dam (west), Mt. Joy Township (north - just across the state line on 134), Barlow 3.1 mi north, Two Taverns (north-northeast), Littlestown (east-northeast), and Kingsdale (east).

Geographic Chronology
Date	Topic	Event	Coordinates
1763		The Mason-Dixon survey placed a marker north of the later 1825 crossroads (named Harney c. 1897) which was later taken—it was replaced during a ceremony c. 1976.	39.7217°N 77.2°W
1808	road	A Pennsylvania court approved a road between Gettysburg and Maryland via a fording through Rock Creek near the Black's Mill dam to allow travel to Taneytown (a c. 1787 westward road to Black's Mill had been established "from John Little's [tavern] on the Baltimore Pike.")	
1815	business (nearby)	Nicholas Eckes built the first home in the vicinity at a site near the Monocacy River, west of the area that would become the town. Eckes performed shoemaking at the farm—his son Enoch Eckes continued shoemaking there & the property transferred to 4 shoemakers: Peter Reigle, John Reindollar, Harry Rineman, and Samuel Eline.	
1824	business	The 1st store was opened by Jesse Cornell [sic] at what became the town of Monocacyville (the property in 1955 was "owned by John Cornel"), and the crossroads community eventually had 3 hotels (a harness shop was at 5949 Conover Road).	
1825	road	The west/east "Emmitsburg and little stone [sic] road was opened up" to become the crossroad with the north/south Gettysburg-Taneytown road. By 1895 the street names were Gettysburg Street (northward), Littlestown Street (eastward to Kingsdale), Taneytown Street (southward), and Emmitsburg Street (south-southwest).	
c. 1839	business	Elijah Eckenrode "opened up a small store" on the "old Lichtenwalter property" (in 1824 Nicholas Eckes had subdivided land and sold part "to Adam Lichtenwalter who built a two story log house", e.g., after moving from the old residence.) In 1843 Jacob Kreglo subsequently bought the small store property which transferred to Philip Shriner who "started wagon making."	
1863-07-01	Civil War	General Hancock was sent north from near Taneytown and passed through Monocacyville to command at Gettysburg ~3-6 pm.	
1863-07-01	Civil War	Hancock's II Corps (Union Army) traveled through Monocacyville to bivouac for the night near Horner's Mill (arrived at the battlefield c. 7am July 2.)	
1863-07-01	Civil War	Ames Battery G established an overnight camp near Monocacyville en route from Taneytown to their Battle of Gettysburg, Second Day, engagement at The Peach Orchard during the afternoon Hood's Assault. (Third Corps artillery trains left Taneytown later on July 2 at 10:30 p.m.)	
1863-07-01	Civil War	George G. Meade from Taneytown passed through Monocacyville en route to Gettysburg, where he arrived at night after Hancock had returned via Horner's Mill and Monocacyville to brief Meade at Taneytown.	
1864	business	"E. D. Hess sold his property to J. Worthington Jones, and [bought] the James Angel…property on Littlestown Street…built an addition to the house [and] small shop [where he] started the cabinetmaking business".	
1866	organization	The Evangelical United Brethren Church, Harney, Md was established—the 1st burial in the United Brethren Cemetery (now Sunrise Cemetery), was tbd—the church was rededicated in 1931, but closed after Rev. Garvin was the pastor in 1955.	
1878	business	George Fream's blacksmith shop closed, which had been the shop of his father (William Fream) until 1876 after the latter built on the Soloman Snider property (previously the John Rathfan property.)	
1879	mail	Bids were solicited for carrying weekly mail via Horner's Mill between Gettysburg and Harney.	
1886	business	James H. Reaver sold his Harney property to surgeon (Harney had a Hesson General Store c. 1915, and Daniel J. Hesson was the 1898 postmaster until moving in 1899 to Hanover, Pennsylvania.)	
1887	school	The Harney "public school started in a room above S. S. Shoemaker's Store, and Mr. J. A. Angell was appointed its teacher". The school was later moved to a 2nd story of a new Shoemaker "agricultural warehouse" where H.O. Harner was a teacher.	
1890	organization	St. Paul's Evangelical Lutheran Church in Harney, which was using Shoemaker Hall, laid the church cornerstone with a list of charter members on land sold by Daniel Hesson. and which The 1st trustees were Dr. John Bush, John Ohler, Martin Slagle, Abraham Waybright, Blanch Yingling and Katherine Hall, and the "first baby baptized in the church was Earlington Shriver" who had been born April 24, 1890.	39°42′55″N 077°12′19″W
1892	business	John Myers moved to Harney to take over Centennial Mill and "William Myers [during] 1893…had a full set of rolls put in".	
1893	organization	The Lutheran church acquired land for their Mountainview Cemetery northwest of Harney (the first burial was tbd.)	
1895-01	business	"Andrew Degroft's large machine shed, just back of the U. B. Church, caught fire one evening about 9 o'clock".	
1895	business	A summer newspaper identified Harney businesses: Daniel J. Hesson's store, W. A. Snider's store, Mr. T. H. Eckenrode's Union Hotel, John J. Hess's blacksmith shop, and the nearby William Myers mill. Other notable 1895 Harney structures were Miss Perry Eyler's place that had been C. F. Reindoller's drug store, D. T. Shoemaker's "most beautiful" home, and W. A. Snider's "most perfectly built" house on Littlestown Street.	
c. 1897	business	After a local storekeeper agreed to keep mail for customers to pick up, Monocacyville was renamed when Emmitsburg's 1893-7 postmaster, James Elder, dubbed the post office "Harney" for General William S. Harney of the American Indian Wars. First postmaster was Jeremiah Reinhart, and Daniel Hess was the 1898 postmaster.	"unknown"
1898	business (nearby)	Myers Mill* near Harney (owned by Mrs. Hannah C. Myers) and the "adjoining" (downstream) Stonesifer Mill claimed the Gettysburg Water Works had decreased the Marsh Creek/Monocacy River water supply and made the mills inoperable. In 1920, Myers' "three story roller mill [burned down] below the juncture of Marsh and Rock creeks near Harney [where] the dam made to furnish water power from the Monocacy [created] a favorite spot for boating and swimming parties" (cf. the Reaser Hose camp adjoining the "Good Samaritan Masonic Camp" northwest of Harney.)**	
1900	mail	A direct postal route between Gettysburg and Taneytown was planned to replace the Pennsylvania circuitous mail route to Harney: Gettysburg (on the square)-Two Taverns (C. A. Yost store) -Harney-Barlow (1890 Mills' store)-Sedgwick (Bushman store at Round Top)-Gettysburg (Occasional deliveries to Harney from the store at the Natural Dam mill to the west provided mail from the Fairplay, Pennsylvania, route.)	
1900	organization	Mason and Dixon Lodge, No. 69 of the Independent Order of Odd Fellows (Oddfellows, colloq.) was founded and had a 1907 anniversary banquet catered by fraternal Brothers Harry E. Rothhaupt and John Thompson. In February 1942 the Lutheran "church bought the Odd Fellows Lodge Hall to be used as a parish house."	39.715083°N 77.206649°W
1915		Community recreation areas at " Shriver's grove, near this place" (east beyond the state line) had a Lutheran church "base ball game" and at "the F. C. Null grove, near town" (just outside on Baptist Road) had the "United Brethren…annual picnic".	
1921	business	Estee Ray Kiser owned a Harney automobile business shop (a c. 1926 garage along Gettysburg Street was open as late as 1942.)	39.714453°N 77.207010°W
tbd	school	A schoolhouse was built (the Harney PTA in April 1955 met in the school.)	
1933	road	A "Memorial Boulevard" proposed [as the] Lincoln Memorial road in 1908, "Washington-to-Gettysburg road" in 1911, & "Lincoln Highway to Gettysburg" in 1913 was planned through Chevy Chase, Silver Spring, New Lisbon (or Westminster), Taneytown, and the Harney area to connect the Lincoln Memorial in Washington DC to the Lincoln Address Memorial in the Gettysburg National Cemetery. (the competing plan for a Lincoln Memorial was completed instead of the Memorial Boulevard.)	
c. 1947	organization	The Harney Baseball Club built a baseball field with grandstand east of the Lutheran church. After playing in the Adams County Baseball league (e.g., 1946), the team lost two players to the 1947 Gettysburg Legion team and joined the South Penn Baseball League in 1953 Taneytown, Harney and the Emmitsburg Legion [replaced] Barlow, Hanover and Granite—Barlow's Chester Shriver was Harney's 1954 manager (the 1976 team name was "Athletics".) In the 1980s the field was converted for slowpitch softball (Harney "Royals"), and it is now owned by the Lutheran church (which now also operates the Sunrise Cemetery started by the Brethren church).	39.715466°N 77.203678°W
1947-10-04	organization	The Monocacy Valley Memorial Post 6918 of the Veterans of Foreign Wars was chartered with 30 members (later built a clubhouse at 5803 Conover Road.)	39.716644°N 77.200263°W
1951	fire co.	The Harney Volunteer Fire Company was established. The "Luther Ridinger Hall"/"Luther Ridinger building" had the initial siren (a shed held 2 fire extinguishers) and the building held meetings (e.g., 1953 fireman's carnival meeting) and recreation events (1956 "Record Hop").	39°43′01″N 77°12′28″W
1951	organization	Harney had a 4-H club.	
1954	store	Miller's General Store was open in Harney (A. C. Leatherman had operated a Harney general store for 29 years.)	
1955-06	fire co.	The Maryland governor spoke at the dedication for the new $23,000 Carroll County Fire Department Station 11 (added to the GNIS in 2006.)	
1955		The United States Coast and Geodetic Survey placed an azimuth marker on the east side of the Lutheran church.	
1976 (by)	organization	The Harney Lions Club had formed, (the Lutheran pastor was the 1998 president.)	
1979-09-12		The USGS designated Harney in the GNIS—the "Harney Post Office (historical)" was designated in 1996 with "unknown" coordinates.	39°42′50″N 077°12′24″W
1986	business	Luther Ridinger's store on the "5000 Block of Harney Road" had a fire.	39.714377°N 77.206748°W
1992-04	business	The Harney General Store, the community's last general store, closed.	
2008-08-04	fire co.	The Harney "first call" service area was increased to include an area of the defunct Kingsdale Fire Company (disbanded in 2014.)	
1992 (by)	business	Harney Woodworking was established for cabinet manufacturing.	
c. 2010	business	A fire at 5036 Harney Road burned the former hotel that was the 2nd house north from the crossroads on the west side (the remains were removed.)	39.714342°N 77.207030°W
