= Plum Run (White Run tributary) =

Coordinates: 39°47′47″N 77°11′41″W

Location
- Country: United States
- State: Pennsylvania
- Region: Adams County

Plum Run is a Pennsylvania stream and tributary of White Run which flows through East Cavalry Field of the Gettysburg National Military Park. The run forms a man-made lake above the Lake Heritage dam near the run's mouth along the Baltimore Pike.
