= Plum Run (Rock Creek tributary) =

Plum Run (Rock Creek tributary) Bloody Run
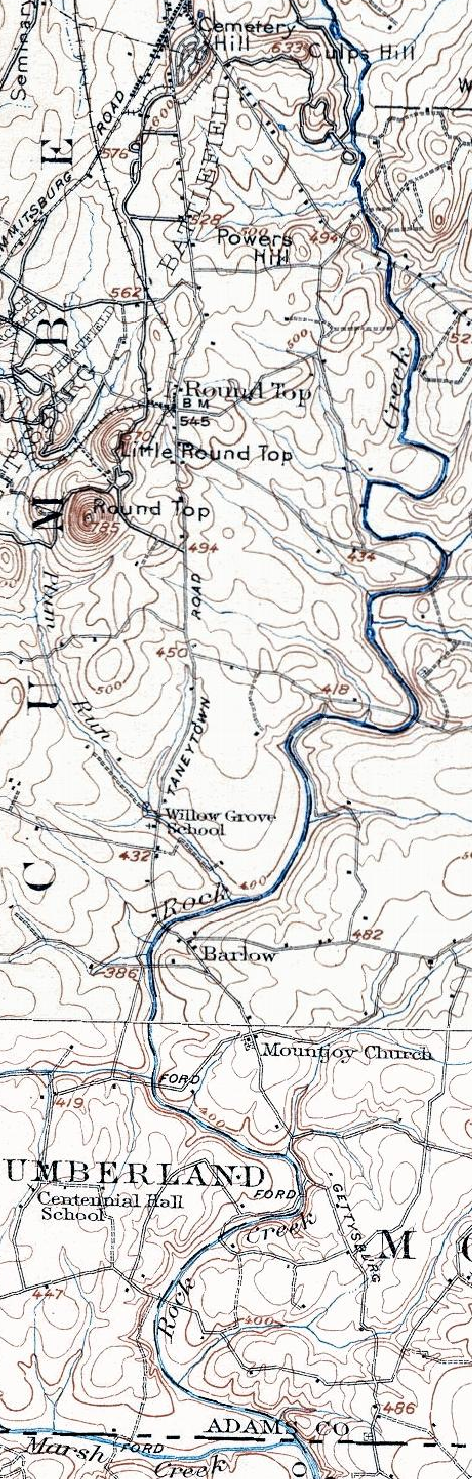
- Plum Run generally flows west of both the Taneytown Road and Rock Creek.

Location
- Country: United States
- State: Pennsylvania
- Region: Adams County
- Township: Cumberland

Physical characteristics
- Source: Field of Pickett's Charge

Basin features
- Namesake: "Plum Run line" of McGilvery's artillery

Plum Run (Rock Run in 1821) is a Pennsylvania stream flowing southward from the Gettysburg Battlefield between the Gettys-Black Divide on the east and on the west, the drainage divide for Pitzer Run, Biesecker Run, Willoughby Run, and Marsh Creek.

== History ==
The Plum Run Valley was the location of Battle of Gettysburg, Second Day, and Third Day military engagements.

In 1972, the Slaughter Pen comfort station was temporarily closed after Youth Conservation Corps participants of Camp Eisenhower discovered fecal pollution in Plum Run.

Plum Run course
Location	Description	Coordinates
headpoints	triple pt (Stevens & Guinn Runs) N of Codori house & barn	39.813151°N 77.23556°W 39.81178°N 77.24021°W
crossing	(historical) Emmitsburg Rd	
perennial flow	USGS map Google Maps	38.80919°N 77.23832°W 39.808219°N 77.238892°W
bridge	United States Avenue	
	crossing	39.801295°N 77.241134°W
confluence	run	
culvert	Wheatfield Road	
culvert	Crawford Avenue	39.796271°N 77.238661°W
confluence	run from Weikert Hill	
bridge	Warren Avenue	
bridge	for Slaughter Pen pedestrians	
site	1894-1917 trolley bridge	39.790167°N 77.243446°W
confluence	Rose Run	
run	confluence	39.78926°N 77.245211°W
bridge	along horse trail fording	39.788244°N 77.245694°W
bridge	Confederate Avenue (1937)	
confluence	Heagy's Woods Run	[relative location tbd]
boundary	National Park/Township	
confluence	run from Ridge Road	
bridge	Knight Road	
bridge	US 15	
bridge	(private)	
confluence	run from north	
confluence	run from west	
bridge	PA 134	39.765039°N 77.231998°W
mouth	Rock Creek (Monocacy River)	39.758969°N 77.226806°W

== See also ==
- List of rivers of Pennsylvania
