= Herbst Woods =

Pennsylvania woodland

Herbst Woods (Note: The woods were owned by local farmer John Herbst at the time of the Battle of Gettysburg, next to a farm owned by Edward McPherson.) or sometimes called McPherson Woods, now known as Reynolds Woods, is a wooded area west of McPherson Ridge near Gettysburg, Pennsylvania. The small wooded area was the location of a military engagement during the first day at the Battle of Gettysburg on July 1, 1863. The battle near the woods occurred around 10 a.m. on the first day of battle at Gettysburg. Confederate Brigadier General James J. Archer took two brigades, consisting of the 1st, 7th and 14th Tennessee Regiments, as well as the 13th Alabama Regiment over Willoughby Run and through Herbst Woods to engage the Union brigades. The Confederates would face off against Brigadier General Solomon Meredith and his brigades consisting of the 19th Indiana, 24th Michigan, 2nd Wisconsin and 7th Wisconsin Regiments. By the time the fight was over at Herbst Woods, Archer had been captured and the Union I Corps Commander John F. Reynolds had been killed. Today Herbst Woods (Reynolds Woods) is renamed in honor of Major General Reynolds.

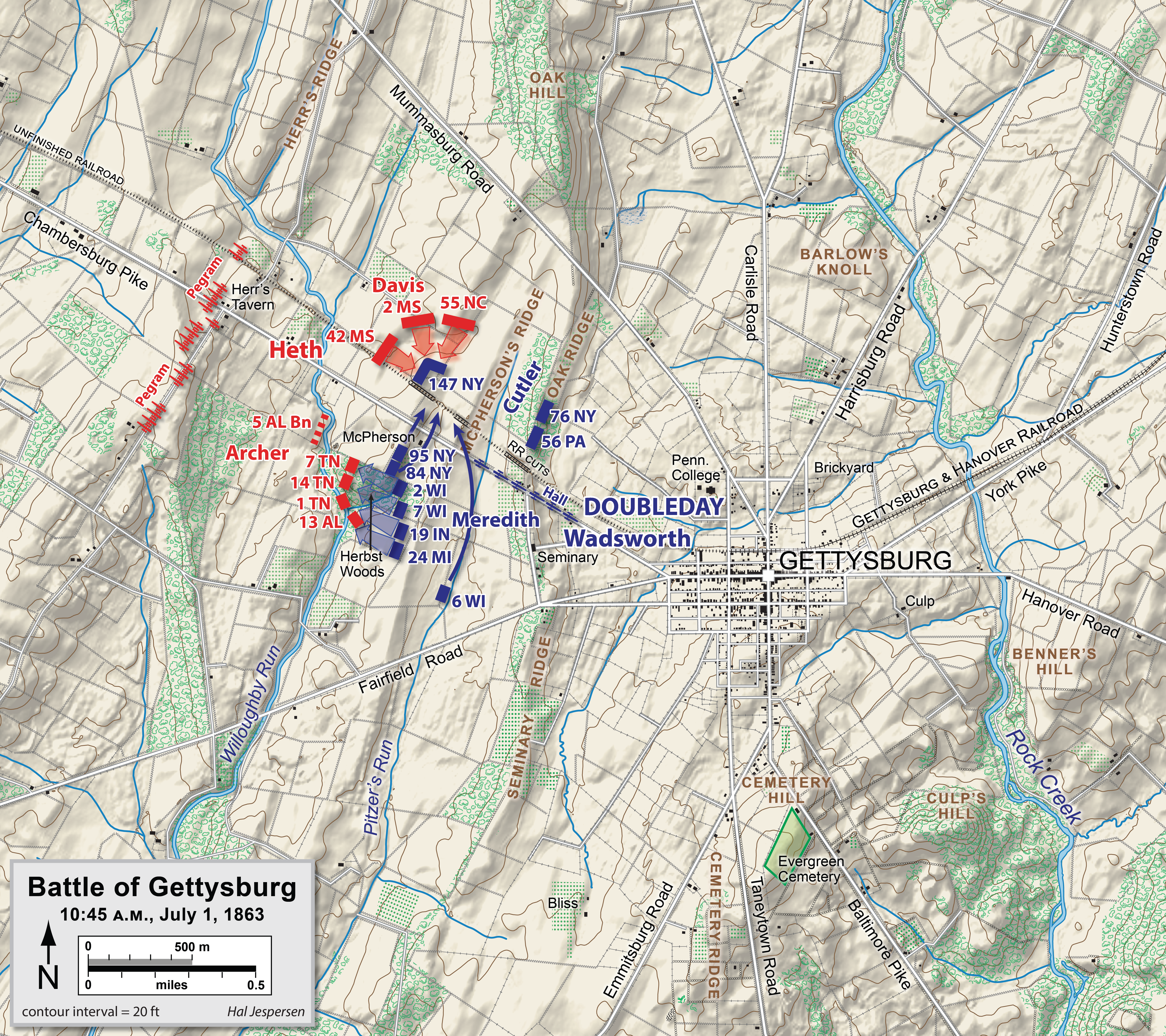
Location of Herbst Woods during the 1st Day of Battle
