= Rock Creek (Monocacy River tributary) =

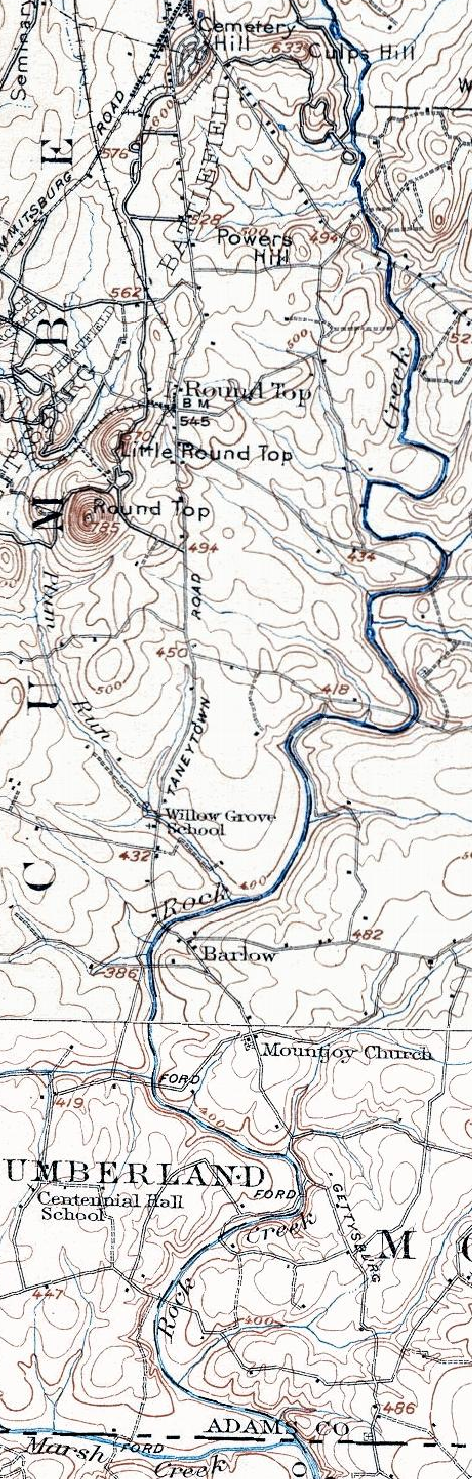
- The confluence of Rock and Marsh Creek is north of the Pennsylvania/Maryland border by 12.7 arcseconds (c. 1907 map).

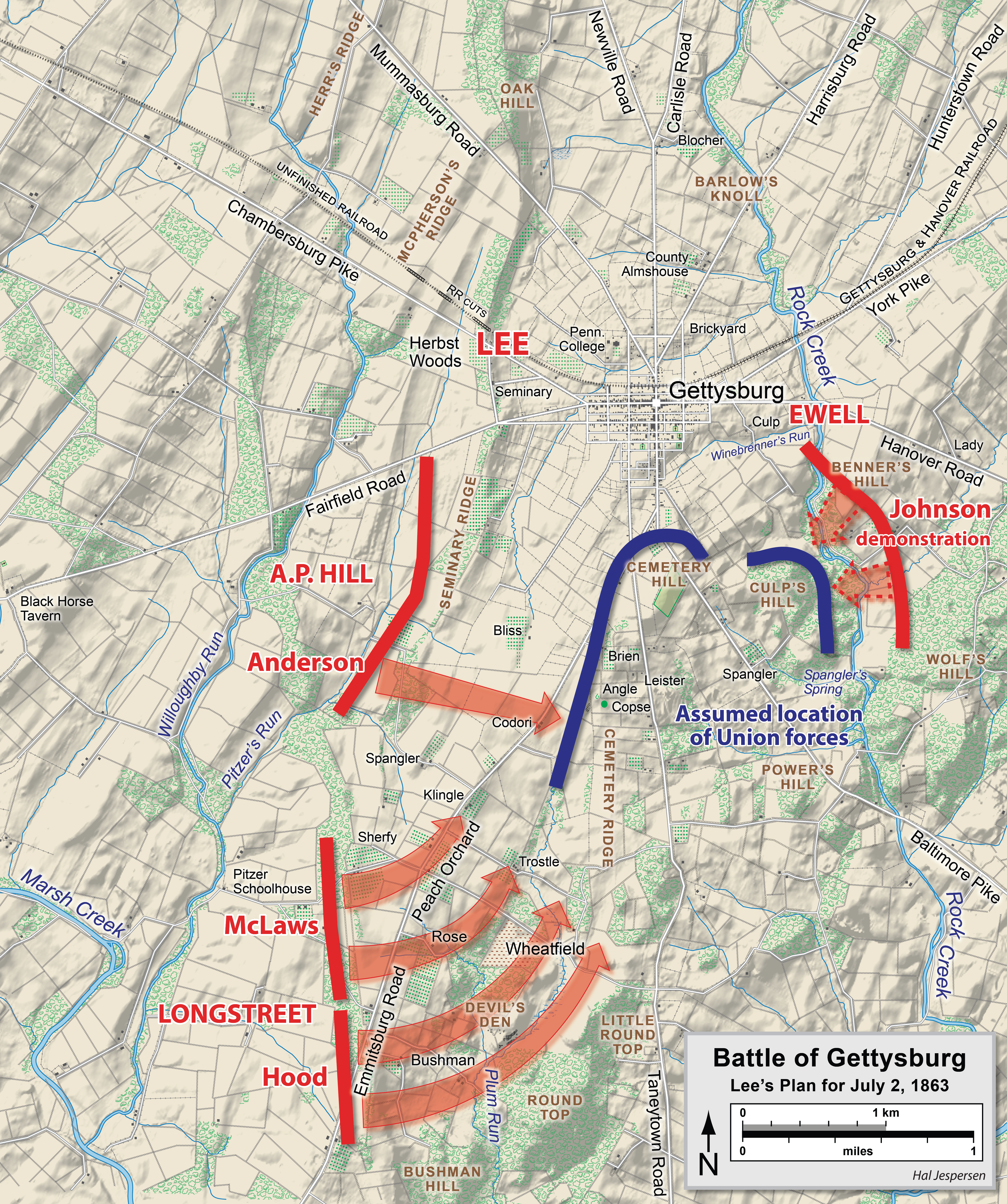
- On July 2, 1863, "Wiedrich's battery [of] six rifled cannon also exchanged fire with one of Jones's batteries on the opposite side of Rock Creek", and snipers from a home on the East side fired on positions on the West side of the creek (on July 3, Confederates retreated across Rock Creek.)

Location
- Country: United States
- State: Pennsylvania
- Region: Adams County
- Townships: West: Cumberland, East: Mount Joy & Straban
- Cities: Gettysburg, PA, Barlow, PA

Physical characteristics
- Source: Susquehanna drainage divide
- Mouth: Monocacy River
- Basin size: 65 sq mi (170 km^{2})

Basin features
- Tributaries
  - left: coordinates shown right-justified
  - right: coordinates shown left-justified
- Namesakes: Civil War: Rock Creek Rangers

Rock Creek is an 18.9-mile-long (30.4 km) tributary of the Monocacy River in south-central Pennsylvania and serves as the border between Cumberland and Mount Joy townships. Rock Creek was used by the Underground Railroad (at McAllister's Mill, "slaves would slosh through the water to throw off the tracking dogs that were pursuing them") and flows near several Gettysburg Battlefield sites, including Culp's Hill, the Benner Hill artillery location, and Barlow Knoll.

Rock Creek intersections, north-to-south
Intersection	Location/Description	Coordinates
Sources	On drainage divide with Conewago Creek Northernmost watershed point: Summit near Oak Hill Rd: Summit on Stone Jug Rd: Summit on Harrisburg Rd:	39.92145°N 77.18907°W
Leedy Rd		39.898669°N 77.190043°W
Shriver's Corner Rd		39.894012°N 77.194464°W
Keller Rd		39.888435°N 77.199297°W
Branch	Crosses US 15 at milepost 13.2 north of Hunterstown Rd bridge	39.87042°N 77.213781°W
Branch	Extends beyond Shriver's Corner Road (at Goldenville Rd) to just beyond Rentzel Rd: 39.911909°N 77.19552°W	39.864656°N 77.21848°W
Boyd's Schoolhouse Rd	Cumberland/Straban township border	39°51′24″N 77°13′24″W
Survey line	Borough line	
	"Site 59" on creek in Cumberland and Straban townships "intended for flood control".	
Blocher's Run	Flow from Marsh Creek (west) & Conewago Creek (north) triple pt on Oak Ridge:39.858792°N 77.24483°W}	39.847665°N 77.225797°W
US 15 Bus.	Harrisburg Road site of former 1846 covered bridge built by Joseph Clapsaddle near Barlow Knoll	39°50′41″N 77°13′22″W
Run	drainage from the east	
Run	Drainage along former site of Alm's house from Gettysburg College's Quarry Lake & Oak Ridge triple point (with Willoughby/Pitzer Runs)	39.838126°N 77.221412°W
Stevens Creek		39.836882°N 77.221527°W
Island	Depicted on 1916 Gettysburg National Military Park map	
Run	(Depicted on battlefield map at right)	
Railroad	Early's Confederates burned the trestle on June 27, 1863 (rebuilt days later & in 1912)	
US 30	1807 3-arch stone bridge of 60 ft (18 m), 1853 covered bridge, 1919 Lincoln Highway bridge, replacement	39°50′54″N 77°13′11″W
PA 116	Site of former 1853 90-foot covered bridge built by John Finly and 1932 concrete bridge.	39°49′51″N 77°13′4″W
Survey line	Borough line	
Winebrenner Run		39.829632°N 77.217922°W
Rock Creek Ravine	Location noted in several battle records	39.826369°N 77.217579°W
Jones Bridge Run?	Flows north of Culp's Hill to confluence just upstream of island	39.822117°N 77.217504°W
Survey line	1893 Warren survey line for Gettysburg Battlefield crossed creek	
Benner Run	Flows southeast of Benner's Hill artillery location ("Ladys Run" in 1886)	39.819645°N 77.213974°W
Ford	between Spangler Spring and farm (Z. Tawney during the battle)	
Spangler Spring Run	Drainage southward from Stevens Knoll	39.814124°N 77.215079°W
Guinn Run		39°48′39″N 77°12′52″W
	Former site of McAllister's Mill dam (destroyed by 1870 flood)	
Run	(Depicted on battlefield map at right)	
Ford	1889 road downstream of McAllister's Mill	
Baltimore Pike	1802 turnpike bridge (north of PA 97 terminus)	39°48′18″N 77°12′41″W
Run	Flows under Baltimore Pike	39.802645°N 77.210825°W
Run		39.798701°N 77.207869°W
Run		39.794015°N 77.209296°W
US 15	Near site of Battle of Gettysburg field hospital at George Bushman Farm:39°47′27″N 77°12′54″W	
White Run	Drainage from Lake Heritage, Pennsylvania	39.784651°N 77.205552°W
Run	Drainage from Weikert Hill and Round Top, Pennsylvania	39.781234°N 77.211699°W
Wright Avenue Run	from Big Round Top	
Sachs Road	1891 bridge	39°46.950′N 77°12.387′W
Little's Run	"Two Taverns Run" in 1901 when bridge was built at Little's Tavern headpoint near White Hall:39.79027°N 77.112651°W	39.77928°N 77.212579°W
Soloman Road	1895 steel Burr arch bridge "Lott's Bridge" at "Lott's fording" & 1977 ("Lott's Bridge") near Pine Bank Cemetery	39°46.339′N 77°12.532′W
Run		39.771634°N 77.212029°W
Rock Creek Ford	Former ford just upstream of bend in creek with overhanging cliff	39.771504°N 77.219124°W
Distributary	Former headpoint of millrace	39.758325°N 77.225368°W
Dam ruins	Former 1798 Black's/Horner's Mill dam to provide head for millrace (rebuilt 1937)	39.771504°N 77.219124°W
Plum Run	Named "Rock" Run in 1821	39.758969°N 77.226806°W
PA 134	Taneytown Rd at Barlow: 1841 covered bridge, c. 1872 replacement, 1923 & 1989 concrete bridges	39°45′24″N 77°13′53″W
Run	Flow from southwest of Big Round Top	39.754449°N 77.232642°W
Run		39.754152°N 77.232771°W
Cromer's Ford	Former ford for Chapel Road route south to Taneytown Rd (horse team, wagon, & driver swept away in 1875)	39.75402°N 77.232599°W
Run	Upstream of site of former ford at Benner Rd	39.745606°N 77.232385°W
Run	Near former intersection of Taneytown Rd & Basehoar-Roth Rd, and upstream of former Swetland Rd ford	39.740095°N 77.218995°W
Mason-Dixon Rd	("Rock Creek Rd") site of 192-foot, single-span 1890 Burr arch bridge (east span collapsed January 5, 1946)	39°43.800′N 77°13.819′W
Lousy Run	Near The Links	39.723445°N 77.228887°W
Mouth	Confluence with Marsh Creek ("The Points")	39°43′12.7″N 77°13′3.7″W

== Tributaries ==
- Blocher's Run is a stream which flows from Oak Ridge (triple watershed point at 39.858792°N 77.24483°W) on the Gettysburg Battlefield eastward to the Rock Creek (39.847665°N 77.225797°W) through and near areas of the Battle of Gettysburg, First Day. During the Battle of Gettysburg Confederate soldiers took cover behind the trees that lined the stream.
- Guinn Run is a stream flowing southeastward from Cemetery Hill past the Gettysburg Museum and Visitor Center to Rock Creek. The stream was bridged by the 1809 Gettysburg and Petersburg Turnpike Company and in the commemorative era by the United States War Department when Hunt and Slocum Avenues were built. A dam was built on Guinn Run to form a pond for Fantasyland, Pennsylvania, through the 1960s and 1970s.
- Spangler Spring Run is a stream which flows from near Culp's Hill to the Rock Creek through Gettysburg Battlefield areas of the Battle of Gettysburg, Second Day, to Rock Creek at 39.814124°N 77.215079°W.
- Stevens Run (Stevens Creek, Tiber) is a tributary of Rock Creek flowing over the Gettysburg Battlefield and through the borough of Gettysburg, Pennsylvania. Within the borough the stream is in a concrete channel, including a covered portion. From 1884 to 1942, the run was spanned by three bridges of the Round Top Branch railroad. Samuel Gettys' Tavern was located on the south side on the uphill slope of the now-named Stevens Run, and Rock Creek Church was approximately on the north bank of the now-named Carlisle Street and Stevens Run. In 1902, a new bridge was built over the Tiber on Chambersburg Street.
- Winebrenner Run is a stream in Gettysburg, flowing eastward to Rock Creek originally from a Gettys-Black Divide triple point (with Stevens Run & Guinn Run) near Zeigler's Grove. The Confederate military line along the stream was the starting point for the battle of East Cemetery Hill on the second day of the Battle of Gettysburg, and most of the upstream portion of the run was engineered c. 1961 into underground drainage to open flow at the school complex near the Culp Farm at East Confederate Avenue.
- White Run is a stream which flows along East Cavalry Field and is an eponym of the Rock Creek-White Run hospital complex. The run's mouth is at Rock Creek near the Trostle Farm along the Sachs Road, site of a hospital east of Round Top, Pennsylvania.

== See also ==
- List of rivers of Pennsylvania
