= Gettys-Black divide =

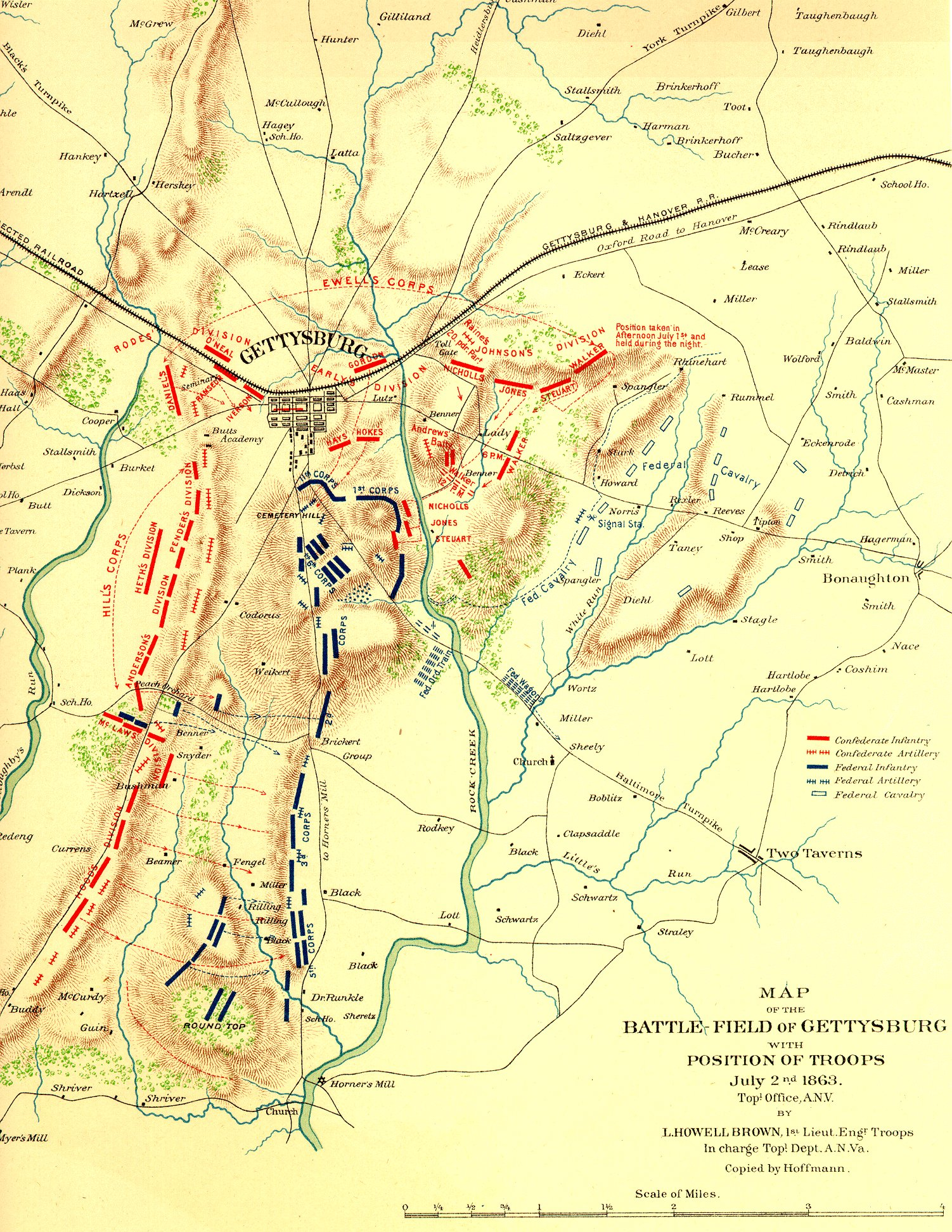
- The northern part of the divide is roughly along a Union line (blue) during the Battle of Gettysburg (the map inaccurately depicts Big Round Top west of Plum Run).

Highest point
- Peak: Big Round Top, north slope
- Elevation
- Coordinates: 39°47′10.73″N 77°14′21.15″W

Naming
- Etymology: Gettys Tavern & Black's Mill

Geography
- Location: northern point (confluence of Stevens Cr/Rock Cr)
- Country: United States
- State: Pennsylvania
- County: Adams
- Range coordinates: 39°50′12.77″N 77°13′17.5″W

The Gettys-Black divide is the primary drainage divide of Cumberland Township, Adams County, Pennsylvania; extending from the mouth of Stevens Creek southward past Samuel Gettys' 1761 tavern ~7 miles to the mouth of Plum Run at the dam site for Robert Black's 1798 Mill. From a ridge within the Gettysburg borough, the divide extends southward across several strategic features of the Gettysburg Battlefield:

- Cemetery Hill (503 ft)
- Cemetery Ridge, including the triple point for Plum R/Stevens Cr (west) & Rock Cr (east)
- Weikert Hill
- Little Round Top
- Big Round Top

The divide descends the east slope of Big Round Top and passes north of a drainage, then extends south-southeast across farm fields near the Taneytown Road to Rock Creek at the unincorporated community of Barlow, Pennsylvania.
