= Skirmish of Littlestown =

Battle of the American Civil War

- Part of Gettysburg campaign
Date	June 30, 1863
Location	Littlestown, Pennsylvania 39.742°N 77.077°W
Result	union victory

Belligerents
(United States) USA (Union)	(Confederate States of America) CSA (Confederacy)

Strength
26th WI (Boebel); 2 other regiments	detachment of cavalry
- Geobox footnotes

The Skirmish of Littlestown was a Pennsylvania military engagement before the Battle of Gettysburg in which "a few companies of skirmishers" of Union infantry defeated a Confederate detachment of J.E.B. Stuart's Cavalry Division.

== Background ==
On the night of June 29, 1863, the Army of the Potomac was deployed in the Pipe Creek defense in northern Maryland with cavalry divisions north of the state line at Fairfield and at Littlestown (Farnsworth's Brigade of Kilpatrick's Cavalry Division left Littlestown for Hanover in a light rain). Stuart's Confederate cavalry had encamped just south of the Mason–Dixon line: "Before dawn on the last day of June, scouts returned with word that enemy cavalry was operating northwest of Union Mills just across the Pennsylvania line at Littletown" [sic], and Stuart's forces "marched by crossroads to Hanover"--meeting the Union cavalry in the Battle of Hanover.

== Engagement ==
Behind the Confederate cavalry was Union infantry which when at Union Mills, identified a Confederate cavalry detachment at Littlestown. Three brigades of the Union "Third brigade at the rear of the division" advanced through the Federal column to proceed ahead to Littlestown, where their skirmishers "brushed away"/"warded off" the cavalry detachment. (Also at Littlestown, Candy's Brigade of the XII Corps, 2nd Division, skirmished with Confederate Cavalry.)

The 123rd NY Regiment of the Union XII Corps followed through Littlestown on June 30 to encamp at Two Taverns, Pennsylvania, before engaging in the Battle of Gettysburg.
