= McPherson Ridge =

Landform in Adams County, Pennsylvania, U.S.

- Middle Ridge
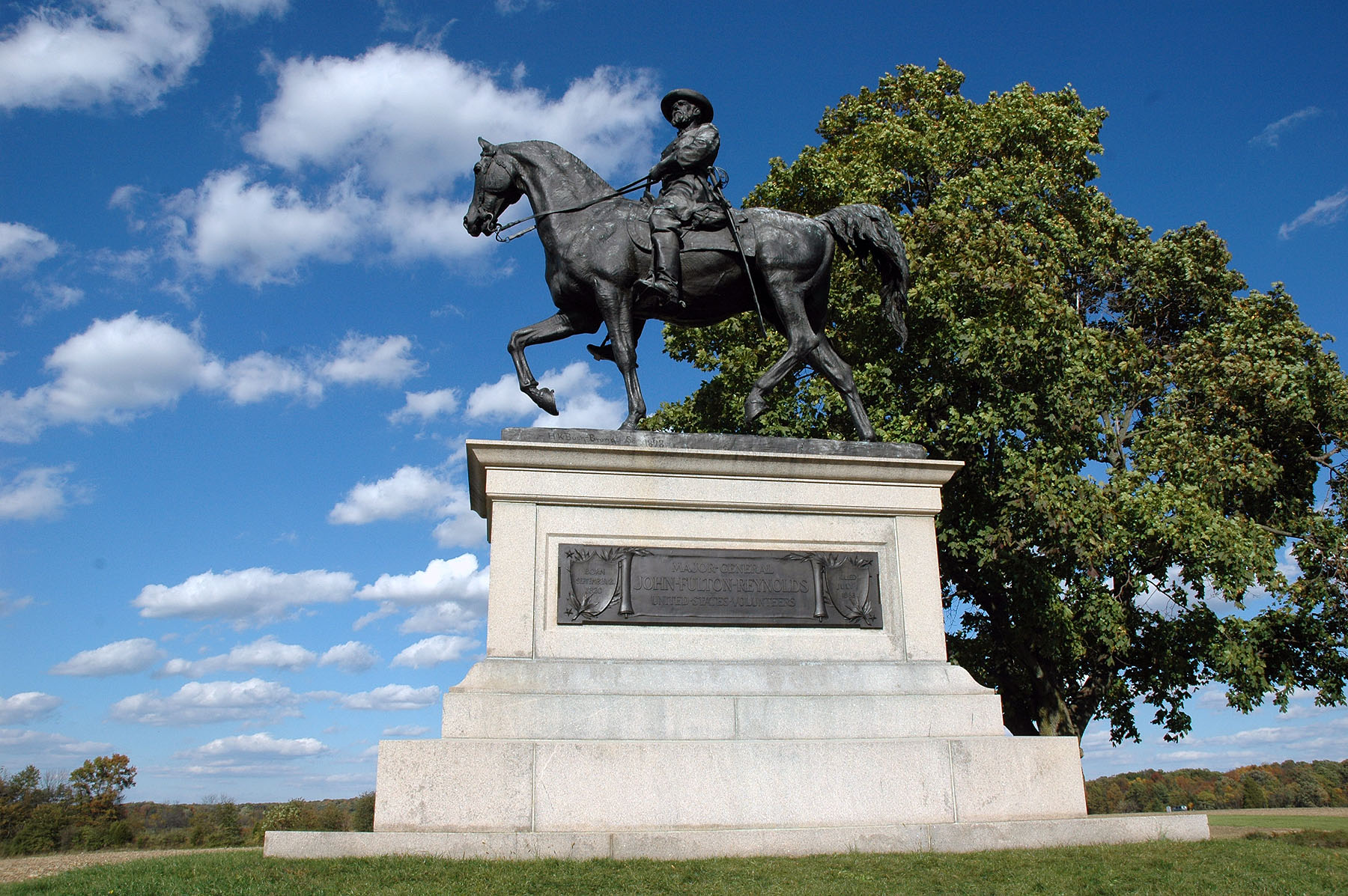
- Gettysburg Battlefield monuments on McPherson Ridge (north-northeast view) include the 1899 John F. Reynolds equestrian statue.

Highest point
- Peak: Northernmost point: Saddle Point at Oak Ridge near the intersection of Reynolds, and Wadsworth Avenues.

Geography
- Location: 1858 Dustman Barn
- Country: United States
- State: Pennsylvania
- County: Adams
- Township & NPS unit: Cumberland and Gettysburg NMP
- Range coordinates: 39°50′13″N 77°15′05″W
- Parent range: "outcrop of the Gettysburg sill"
- Borders on: Willoughby Run, Oak Ridge and Pitzer Run

McPherson Ridge is a landform used for military engagements during the 1863 Battle of Gettysburg, when the I Corps of the Union Army had a headquarters on the ridge and was defeated by the Confederate division of Major General Henry Heth. The ridge has terrain above ~530 ft (160 m) and is almost entirely a federally protected area except for township portions at the southern end and along Pennsylvania Route 116, including a PennDOT facility. The northern end is a slight topographic saddle point on the west edge of Oak Ridge, and summit areas above 560 ft (170 m) include 4 on/near the Lincoln Highway, a broader summit south of the Fairfield Road, and the larger plateau at the northern saddle.

== History ==
In 1747, the Nichol's Gap Road (later "Hagerstown Road", now Fairfield Road) was built over the ridge, followed by the road on the north that became the 1809 turnpike from Gettysburg to Black's Gap (extended to Chambersburg in 1810). In 1835, Middle Ridge had the middle of three 1835 railway cuts (cf. Herr Ridge & Seminary Ridge) excavated for the Tapeworm Railroad. In the 1850s, the Old Mill Road across the ridge had been established northwest from the Hagerstown Road past the J. Herbst farm along Willoughby Run. During the 1858 Hopkins survey, the "H. Dustman" farm was on the ridge along the turnpike's south side and east of the "Toll Gate", while along Willoughby Run on the ridge's west slope and north of the railway bed were the farms of "Heirs of Wm McPherson" & "J. B. McPherson". After moving back to Gettysburg in 1856, attorney Edward McPherson inherited a farm in 1858 which had 66.5 acres (26.9 ha) by 1863. On June 30, 1863, John Buford's Union cavalry camped 400 yd (370 m) east of the ridge prior to the Battle of Gettysburg.

=== Battle of Gettysburg ===
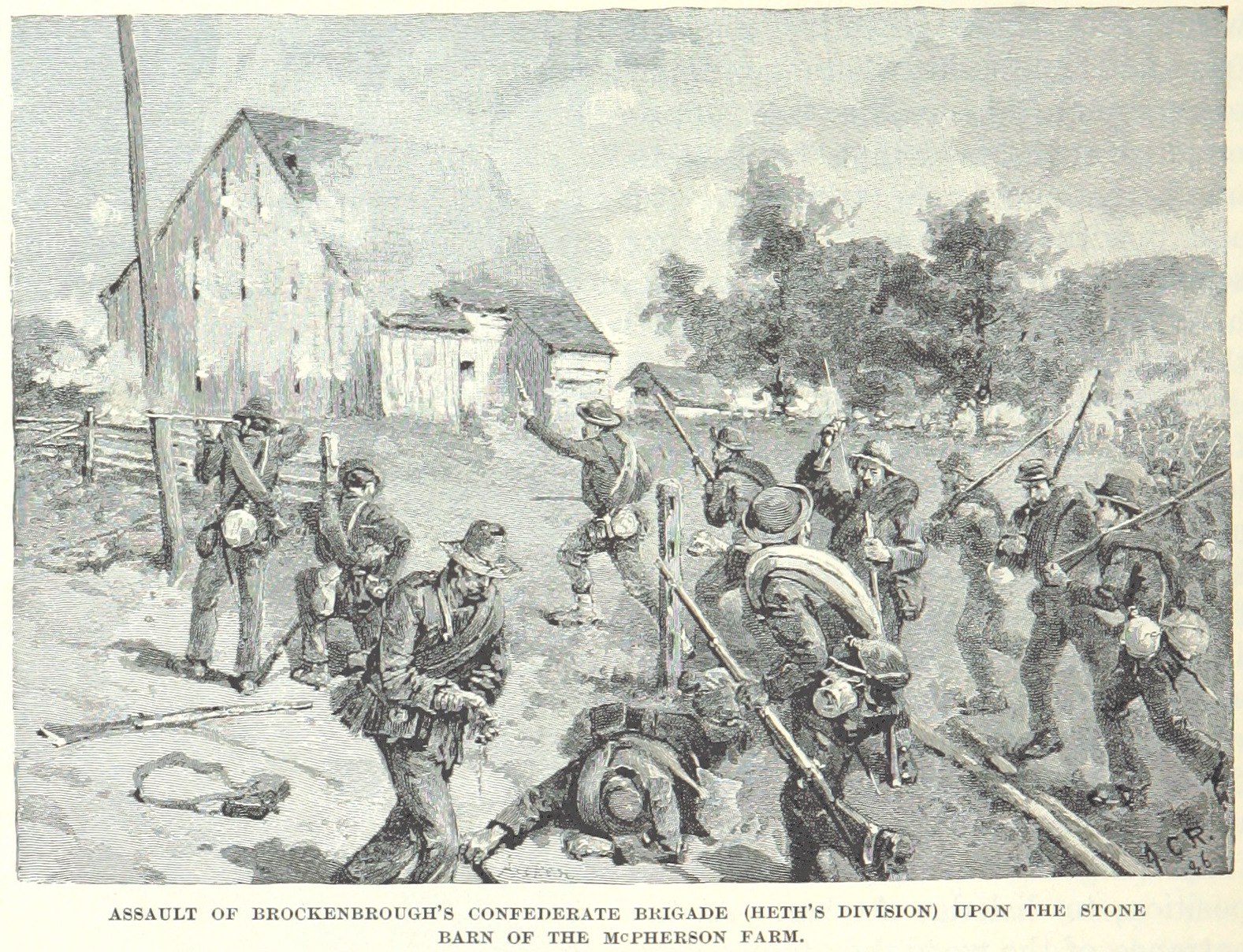
The Confederate assault on the barn

On July 1, 1863, at ~8 am, Buford's 3,200 dismounted cavalrymen held the ridge until 10:30 am against 7,000 Confederates until the arrival of the I Corps infantry. After the Union forces retreated to Seminary Ridge, 2 companies of the 55th Virginia Infantry Regiment attacked the "large barn in which many of the Yankees took refuge. ... An officer standing in the door of the barn, when ordered to surrender by Major Lauson, refused"; and after the barn was captured it was used as a field hospital.

In 1869, a "Horse Railway" was built over the ridge from the borough station, and in 1884 the steamtrain railroad was extended westward through the railway cut (a 1902 plan to extend the electric trolley over the ridge was not implemented.) A Pennsylvania bill passed in 1885 for the 1886 John F. Reynolds monument in Herbst Woods erected by "Post No. 9, G.A.R." In 1887, Gettysburg Battlefield Memorial Association Director Edward McPherson acted as the agent for Samuel A. Whitney, who sold 17 acres (6.9 ha) on the ridge for a GBMA avenue, and the 1887 "Iron Platt Truss Bridge" over the railway cut was built by the Gilbert and Smith Foundry for the "First Day's Avenue". The ridge's modern name was used as early as 1892—in Minnigh's What They Did Here ("West Reynolds Avenue, McPherson Ridge")—and in a newspaper by The Sun for a 1913 Gettysburg reunion report.

=== Gettysburg National Military Park ===
After the February 1895 "Sickles Gettysburg Park Bill" (28 Stat. 651) passed, John B. McPherson deeded 58.18 acres (23.54 ha) to the United States in April, and the eminent domain decree of United States v. Five Tracts of Land on October 2, 1900, seized 3 "Reynolds Woods" tracts totalling 40.47 acres (16.38 ha). Stone Avenue was constructed in 1902, and by 1904 Meredith Avenue was on part of the "Springs Hotel Avenue and [former] Horse Railroad". On December 24, 1904, the Gettysburg National Military Park acquired 36.56 acres (14.80 ha) on/near the ridge for $3,626 and in 1906, part of Pennsylvania's Camp Henderson was on the ridge.

In 1913, the Chambersburg Turnpike was designated part of the original Lincoln Highway, and in 1927 the Hagerstown Road became Pennsylvania Route 51 (Pennsylvania Route 116 in 1928). The National Park Service replaced the commemorative era guide station on the pike with a Gettysburg Parkitecture entrance station ("Lincolnway station" of Gettysburg Granite) which opened on June 5, 1937; and the 1903 bridge over the railway cut was replaced in 1958 for Mission 66. A Battlefield America Guide about the ridge was published in 2002, and monuments on the ridge were designated historic district contributing structures in 2004.
