= Stevens Run (Rock Creek tributary) =

River in Adams County, Pennsylvania, United States

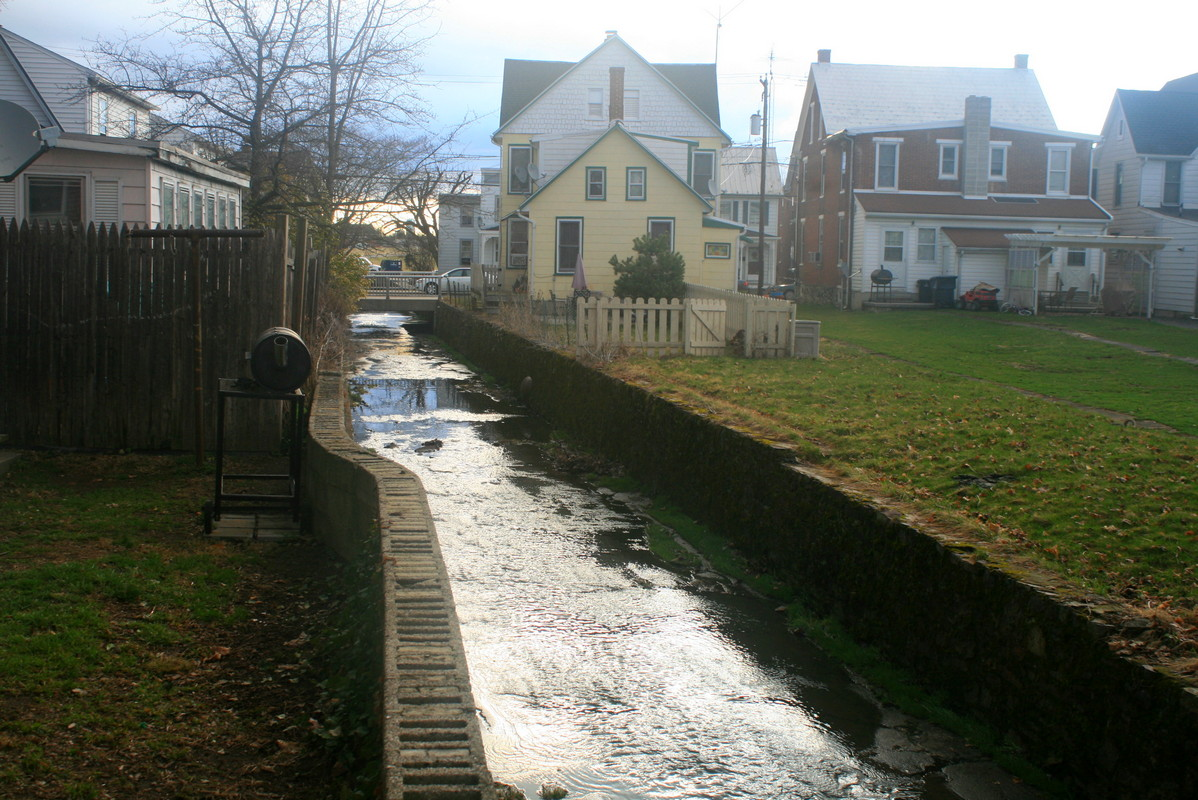
Stevens Run (2015)

Stevens Run (Stevens Creek, Tiber) is a tributary of Rock Creek in Pennsylvania in the United States.

Stevens Run flows over the Gettysburg Battlefield and through the borough of Gettysburg, Pennsylvania. Within the borough the stream is in a concrete channel, including a covered portion. From 1884 to 1942, the run was spanned by three bridges of the Round Top Branch railroad.

== History ==
Stevens Run was named after Thaddeus Stevens, a congressman from Pennsylvania.

Samuel Gettys' Tavern was located on the south side on the uphill slope of the now-named Stevens Run, and Rock Creek Church was approximately on the north bank of the now-named Carlisle Street and Stevens Run. In 1902, a new bridge was built over the Tiber on Chambersburg Street.

Course, northeast-to-southwest
Intersection	Location/Description	Coordinates
Mouth	Rock Creek confluence	
Bridge	site of 1912 bridge	
Bridge	Former borough site of 1920 bridge	
Boundary	Exits GNMP land	
Run	Confluence with flow from Colt Park	39°49.319′N 77°14.529′W
	Perennial flow	39.81631°N 77.25540°W
	Flow from Plum & Guinn runs' triple pt	
Headpoint	N of Codori house & barn	39.81178°N 77.24021°W

== See also ==
- List of rivers of Pennsylvania
