= Spangler Spring Run =

Location
- Country: United States
- State: Pennsylvania
- Region: Adams County

Spangler Spring Run is a Pennsylvania stream which flows from near Culp's Hill to the Rock Creek through Gettysburg Battlefield areas of the Battle of Gettysburg, Second Day, to Rock Creek (Monocacy River) at 39.814124°N 77.215079°W.
