= Pitzer Run =

Coordinates: 39°48′15″N 77°16′01″W

Location
- Country: United States
- State: Pennsylvania
- Region: Adams County
- Township: Cumberland

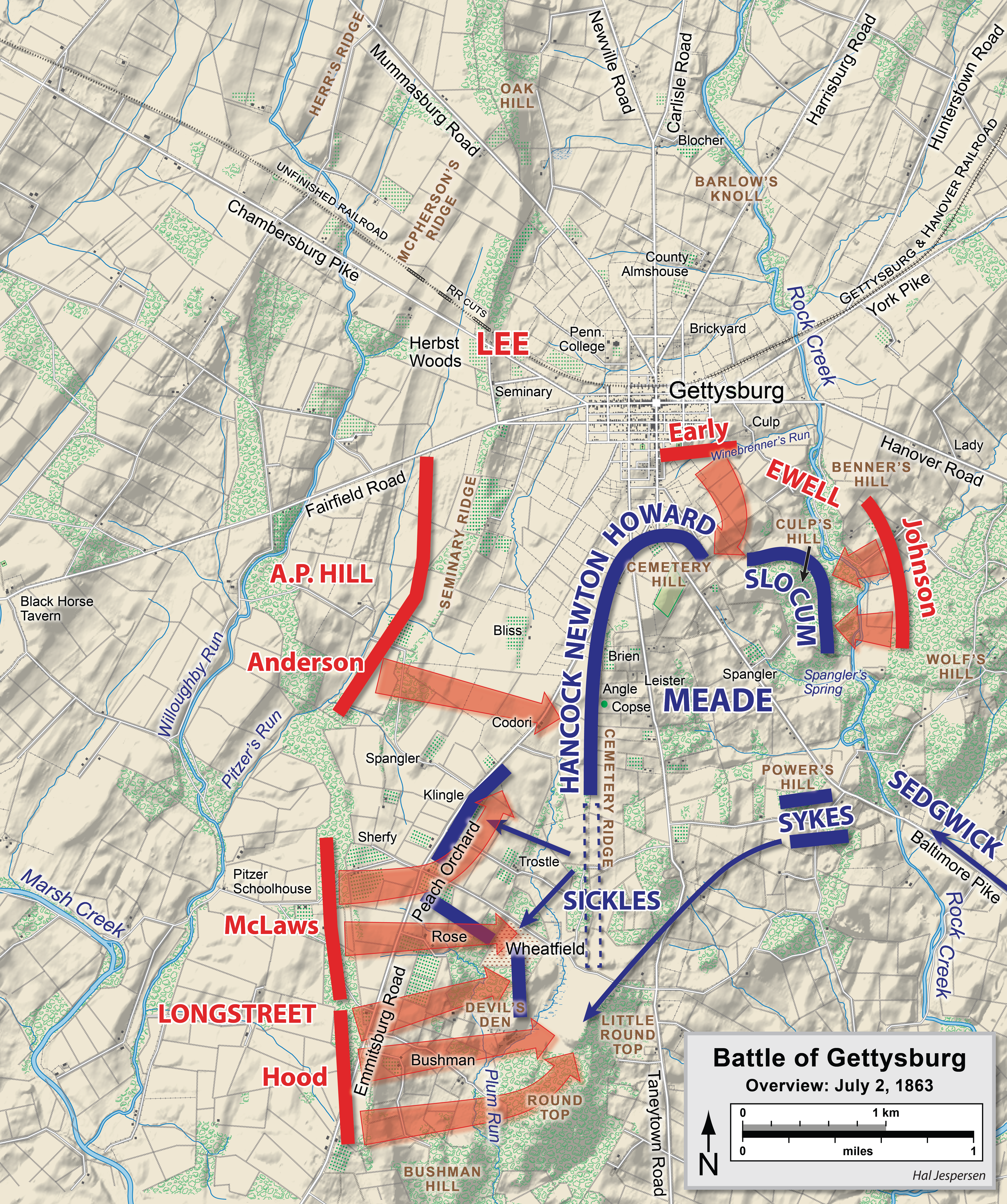
The stream runs from the north to the south, along the west flank of Seminary Ridge

Pitzer Run is a Pennsylvania stream flowing southward between McPherson Ridge and Seminary and Warfield Ridges through the Gettysburg Battlefield to Willoughby Run at the site of Pitzer's School, which was Confederate General Longstreet's headquarters during the Battle of Gettysburg (the school burned in 1915).

== History ==
This site was the location of an important clash between Berdan's Sharpshooters and Longstreet's corps as they were assembling prior to Pickett's charge. General Sickles described this in his oration after the battle, noting "Col. Berdan pushing through the curtain of woods, hurled his dauntless little band directly against the force intended to crush in our left flank and seize the Round Tops."
