= Guinn Run =

Location
- Country: United States
- State: Pennsylvania
- Region: Adams County

Physical characteristics
- Mouth
  - coordinates: 39.8112°N 77.2145°W

Guinn Run is a Pennsylvania stream flowing southeastward in the Gettysburg National Military Park from Cemetery Hill past the Gettysburg Museum and Visitor Center to Rock Creek.

== History ==
Guinn Run was historically part of a 150-acre (61 ha) farm owned by the William Guinn family between 1776 and 1876. The stream was bridged by the Gettysburg and Petersburg Turnpike Company in 1809. On July 3, 1863, during the Battle of Gettysburg, the Union army fired artillery shells upon the Confederate army in the wet meadows of the stream from nearby elevated positions including Powers Hill, which was protected by the junction between Guinn Run and Rock Creek proper. Another bridge was erected by the United States War Department on Hunt Avenue circa 1913.

A dam was built on Guinn Run in the 1960s to form a paddle boat pond for Fantasyland Amusement Park, a theme park targeted at young children which operated between 1959 and 1980. The dam had fallen into disrepair by the late 1980s; a small breach had formed in the center by the spring of 1987 and vegetation growing from the dam exacerbated water seepage and erosion. In 1989, a $12.5 million (1989 USD) development concept plan was approved, which included the repair of the dam and removal of Fantasyland structures.

In 2004, the Gettysburg National Battlefield Museum Foundation and National Park Service received approval to remove the pond and restore a 530 ft (160 m) section of Guinn Run. The foundation then launched a $95 million (2005 USD) project the following year to return the Gettysburg Battlefield to its original state during the Battle of Gettysburg in 1863 and to build a new visitor center and museum, starting with the restoration of the stream. The project was completed in 2008, during which 1.912 acres (7,740 m^{2}) of wetlands were restored alongside the stream to compensate for the 0.682 acres (2,760 m^{2}) of wetlands disturbed during the construction of the new facilities.
