= Blocher's Run =

Location
- Country: United States
- State: Pennsylvania
- Region: Adams County

Blocher's Run is a Pennsylvania stream which flows from Oak Ridge (triple watershed point at 39.858792°N 77.24483°W) on the Gettysburg Battlefield eastward to the Rock Creek (39.847665°N 77.225797°W) through and near areas of the Battle of Gettysburg, First Day.

During the Battle of Gettysburg Confederate soldiers took cover behind the trees that lined the stream.

== See also ==
- List of rivers of Pennsylvania
