= Two Taverns, Pennsylvania =

Unincorporated community in Pennsylvania, US

Two Taverns
- Location within Pennsylvania
- Coordinates: 39°46′42″N 77°09′56″W
- Country: United States
- State: Pennsylvania
- Time zone: UTC-5 (EST)
  - Summer (DST): UTC-4 (EDT)
- ZIP code: 17325

Two Taverns is an unincorporated community on Pennsylvania Route 97 (Baltimore Pike) between Gettysburg and Littlestown in Adams County, Pennsylvania, United States. During the Battle of Gettysburg, Kilpatrick's Union cavalry was ordered to the community prior to a charge at the South Cavalry Field.

== History ==
During the late 1870s, the Grace Evangelical Lutheran church was founded in Two Taverns.
