= Fairplay, Pennsylvania =

Unincorporated community in Pennsylvania, US

Fairplay
- Unincorporated community
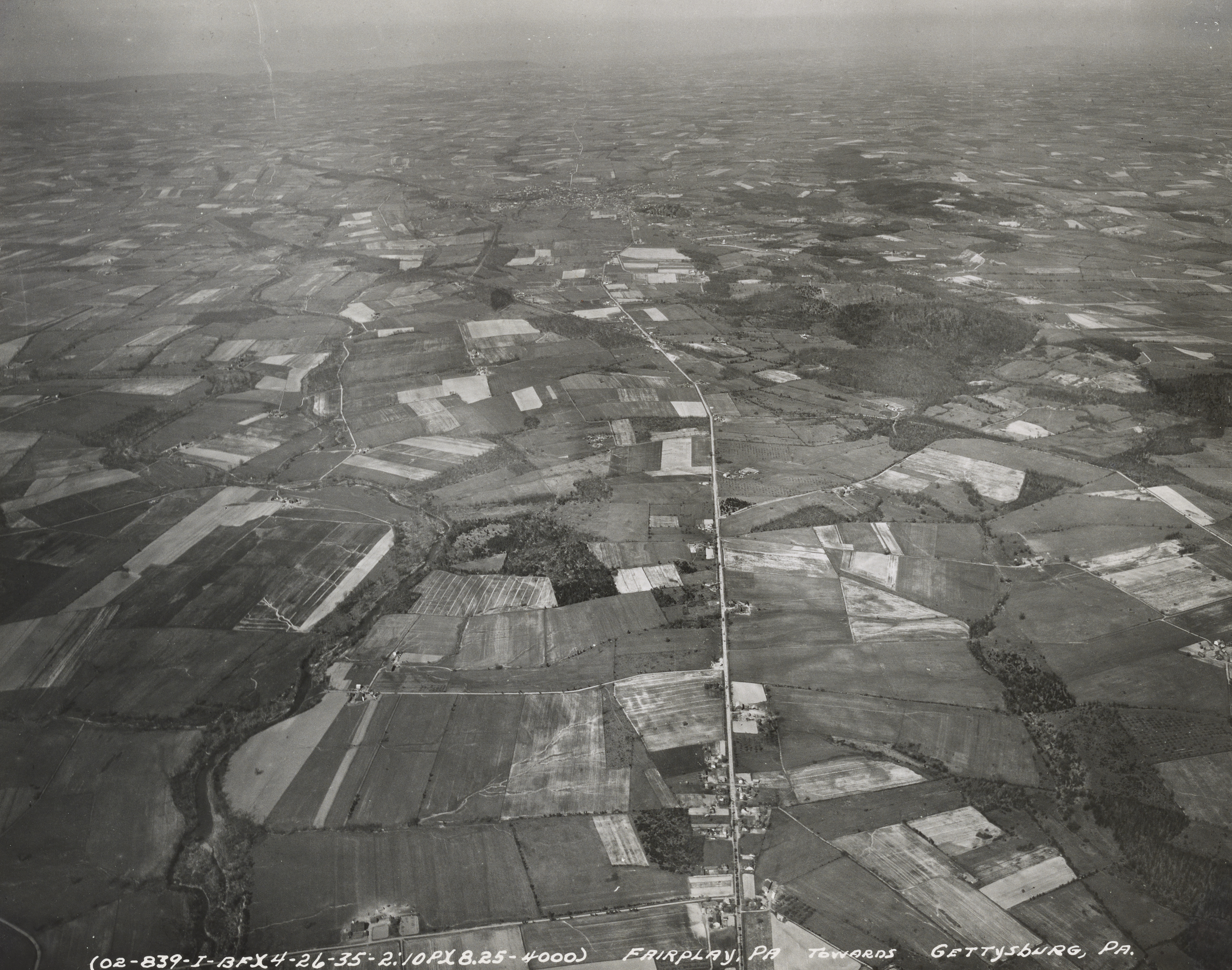
- Fairplay in 1935, looking towards Gettysburg

- Location of Fairplay in Pennsylvania
- Coordinates: 39°44′32″N 077°17′09″W
- Country: United States
- State: Pennsylvania
- County: Adams
- Township: Freedom Township
- Elevation: 515 ft (157 m)
- Time zone: UTC-5 (EST)
  - Summer (DST): UTC-4 (EDT)
- ZIP code: 17325
- Area code: 717

Fairplay is a populated place in Adams County, Pennsylvania, United States. It is located between the Gettysburg Battlefield and the Mason–Dixon line at the intersection of U.S. Route 15 and the Emmitsburg Road, near Marsh Creek, in Freedom Township. Moritz' Tavern at the intersection was the site of General John F. Reynolds' headquarters the night before the Battle of Gettysburg.
