= Big Round Top =

Hill in Pennsylvania, United States

Big Round Top Round Top — Great Round Top Round Top Mountain — Sugar Loaf Hill
- Hill
- 1863 O'Sullivan image of Big Round Top beyond Little Round Top breastworks

- Location within Pennsylvania
- Coordinates: 39°47′10.5″N 77°14′21.1″W
- Location: NE slope @ Little Round Top
- Geology: Pennsylvania Piedmont physiographic region
- Website: Gettysburg Scenic Vistas (nps.gov)

Big Round Top is a boulder-strewn hill notable as the topographic high point of the Gettysburg Battlefield and for 1863 American Civil War engagements for which Medals of Honor were awarded. In addition to battle monuments, a historic reconstruction era structure on the uninhabited hill is the Big Round Top Observation Tower Foundation Ruin.

== Geography ==
Big Round Top is the southern peak of the Gettysburg Battlefield and is within the area encompassed by a drainage depression (southeast, south), Plum Run (west, north), and the Crawford Avenue/Wright Avenue roadway (north, northeast). In addition to Little Round Top, adjacent battlefield locations are South Cavalry Field/Slyder Field (west), Devil's Den (northwest) and the Valley of Death/Slaughter Pen (north).

The hill is the highest point of an Adams County dendritic ridge which Plum Run divides at Big Round Top (the drainage divide continues to the east). In addition to Little Round Top (650 ft.), nearby heights are Warfield Ridge (west), hills of 580 ft and 540 ft (northwest), and Houck Ridge (north-northwest); while Carr Hill (876 ft) is the nearest higher hill. Devil's Kitchen is rock formation and small cave on the lower slopes of Big Round Top.

== History ==
The igneous hill was formed 200 million years ago when the outcrop of the Gettysburg sill intruded through the Triassic Gettysburg plain. Subsequent periglacial frost wedging during the Pleistocene formed the hill's extensive boulders. Early human activity included Indigenous people clearing an area on the slope of Big Round Top and establishing a burial ground about one mile southwest. prior to the 1736 British purchase of the region.

=== Civil War ===
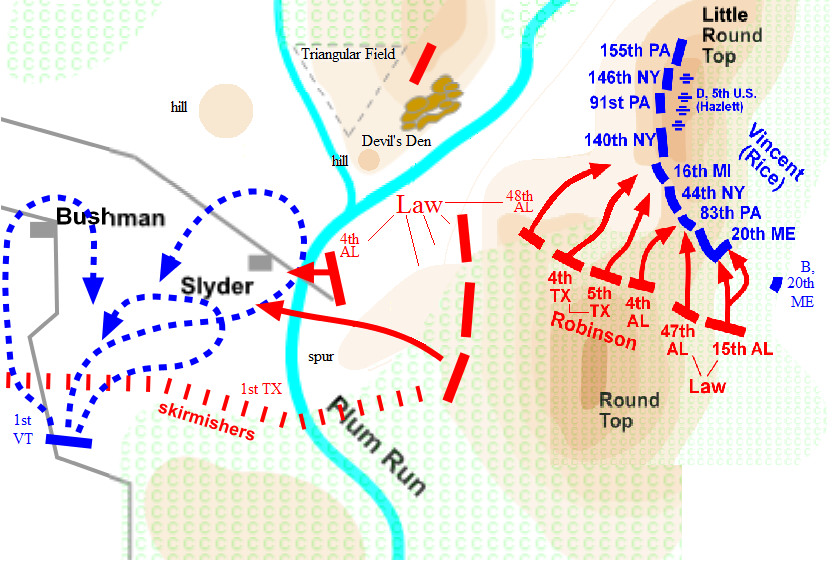
July 3 (left) & July 2, (right), positions & movements: •Left: Well's charge (not depicted) crossed Plum Run and turned to pass behind the Confederates (red) on the spur of Big Round Top. •Right: After the "20th ME" had 'refused the line' (4th & 5th TX were temporarily under Law). Earlier on July 2 from Big Round Top, 2 of Law 's CSA (red) regiments assaulted the 20th ME.

During the Battle of Gettysburg, Big Round Top's slope, timber, and boulders precluded placement of artillery on the summit. At various times during the 1863 battle, positions on Big Round Top formed the left flank of the Union defense. No fighting or other actions took place on Big Round Top on July 1.

Battle of Gettysburg, second day
On July 2 when "it was growing dark", Big "Round Top was still in [the] possession of the [Confederate] skirmishers, who were firing upon our men. It was important to hold this hill, as…it commanded…our line. I directed Colonel Fisher to occupy it at once. He immediately detached [3 regiments], who advanced promptly, driving the enemy before them" (Crawford's report).

After 10 pm, Chamberlain's 20th Maine Volunteer Infantry Regiment occupied a Big Round Top summit position (the monument is on the north slope). In 1893, Chamberlain was awarded a Medal of Honor for both "carrying the advance position on the Great Round Top" and "holding his position on the Little Round Top against repeated assaults" earlier in the day.

Battle of Gettysburg, third day
The July 3 Wells cavalry charge advanced from the west to beyond the Big Round Top spur and engaged the rear of Law's Alabama regiments to carry the hill and earn Wells' 1891 Medal of Honor.

Late in the day of July 3, Union brigadier general Judson Kilpatrick ordered the cavalry brigade of Brigadier General Elon Farnsworth to charge Confederate infantry of Major General John Bell Hood’s division who were on and near the slopes of Big Round Top. Hood had been wounded the previous day, and his division was under the command of Brigadier General Evander Law. One after another, three of the four regiments of Farnsworth’s brigade charged over broken ground into Confederate fire and were repulsed. The final regiment, the 1st Vermont, then made the attempt. Farnsworth divided it into three battalions and personally led the second battalion.

By September 1863, David McConaughy had begun to acquire a portion of Big Round Top for battlefield preservation. The Elon J. Farnsworth monument was erected before 1896 at the base of Big Round Top, and statues of William Wells (1931) and John Michael Tobin are also on the hill.

=== Reconstruction era ===
Kilpatrick Avenue had been completed at the west base of Big Round Top by 1895 when the gravel South Confederate Avenue was constructed across the northwest slope. In 1903, Wright Avenue was constructed along the northeast slope, and in 1937, South Confederate Avenue and the Plum Run stone bridge were rebuilt for the 75th battle anniversary and reunion.

In 1940, Seminary Ridge CCC workers rerouted the stone trail to the Big Round Top summit. Harry Truman visited Big Round Top in 1946. In 1964, the Big Round Top Nature Trail was created around the hill and provided access to the Devil's Kitchen. The 1895 Big Round Top Observation Tower was dismantled in 1968 and the foundation was named a historic ruin in 2004.

=== Observation Tower ===
The tower was built in the late 19th century. Fred Lyons of Baltimore led the construction team that moved the foundation's granite blocks to the Big Round Top summit using block and tackle driven by a 12-horsepower engine. Constructed on the Gettysburg Battlefield's highest hill, the Big Round Top tower was to be replaced for the 1938 anniversary reunion by a stone "Gettysburg Peace Memorial" with a 75-foot-high observation deck above the summit and a flame 30 feet higher.

a. "Measure Calls for Creation of $100,000 Fund; Eternal Light To Be Built on Battlefield and Dedicated at Anniversary and Reunion in 1938" (Google News Archive). January 30, 1937.
a. (The memorial was instead erected on Oak Hill.)

==== Destruction ====
During 1968 tower maintenance, the Schlesser Demolition Co dismantled the Big Round Top tower as uneconomical due to "its condition and the very limited use [due to an uphill, lengthy, and serpentine trail.] Most who started the climb gave out en route, and upon reaching the tower decided against continuing the climb to the top of the metal observatory" (GNMP Superintendent George F. Emery). The foundation ruin (park structure RU05) of the "national landmark" tower, was "entered-documented" as a historic site on January 23, 2004.

External images
- monuments
- bas-relief of "Farnsworth's Charge"
- view from 300' National Tower

== See also ==
- Little Round Top
- Gettysburg Battlefield Historic District
- Gettysburg National Military Park
- Geography of Pennsylvania
