= Pennsylvania Route 134 =

State highway in Adams County, Pennsylvania, US

Pennsylvania Route 134
- Taneytown Road

Route information
- Maintained by PennDOT
- Length: 7.463 mi (12.011 km)
- Existed: 1928–present

Major junctions
- South end: Harney Road at Maryland state line near Barlow
- US 15 near Gettysburg
- North end: US 15 Bus. in Gettysburg

Location
- Country: United States
- State: Pennsylvania
- Counties: Adams

Highway system
- Pennsylvania State Route System; Interstate; US; State; Scenic; Legislative
← PA 133	→ PA 135

Pennsylvania Route 134 (PA 134), also called Taneytown Road (/ˈtɔːnitaʊn/ TAW-nee-town), is a north–south, two-lane state highway in Adams County, Pennsylvania. It runs from the Maryland border at the Mason–Dixon line in Mount Joy Township north to U.S. Route 15 Business (US 15 Bus.) in Gettysburg. PA 134 runs through farmland between the Maryland border and an interchange with the US 15 freeway. North of here, the route passes through Round Top and serves Gettysburg National Military Park before reaching its northern terminus. Taneytown Road was created in 1800 to connect Gettysburg with Taneytown, Maryland. The road was used during the 1863 Battle of Gettysburg for the procession to the cemetery consecration at which the Gettysburg Address was delivered. PA 134 was designated to its current alignment in 1928, with the section north of Round Top paved. The southern portion of the route was paved in the 1930s.

== Route description ==
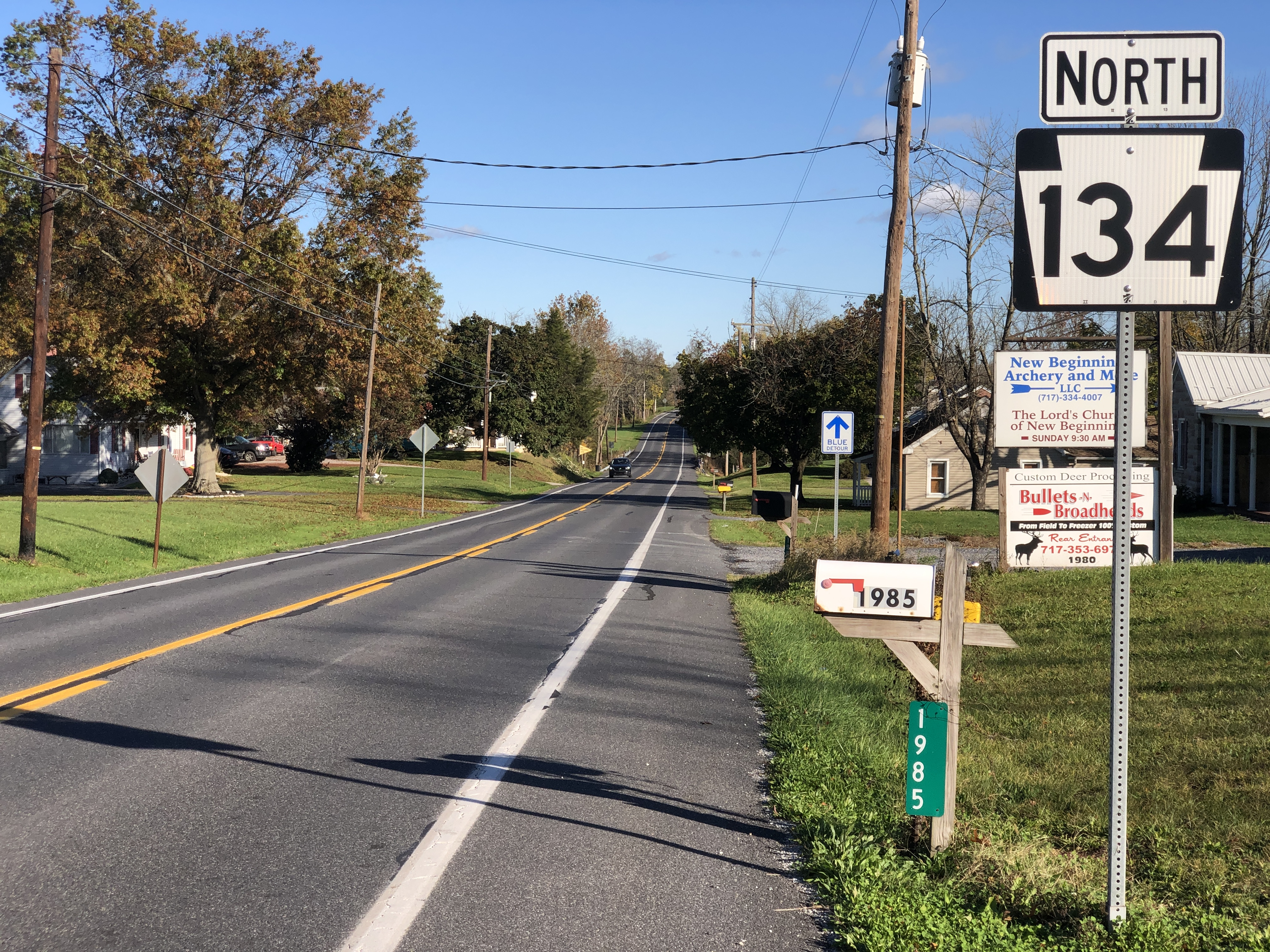
PA 134 northbound in Cumberland Township

PA 134 begins at the Maryland border, where Harney Road continues south into that state, leading to Maryland Route 140 in Taneytown. From the state line, the route heads north along two-lane undivided Taneytown Road through agricultural areas with a few homes and patches of woods in Mount Joy Township. After passing through Barlow, PA 134 crosses the Rock Creek into Cumberland Township. At this point, the route turns north and reaches a diamond interchange with the US 15 freeway. Past this interchange, the road enters the grounds of Gettysburg National Military Park and passes through the community of Round Top. Continuing through more of the park, the route runs to the west of Evergreen Cemetery. PA 134 enters the borough of Gettysburg and ends at US 15 Bus. near Gettysburg National Cemetery.

== History ==
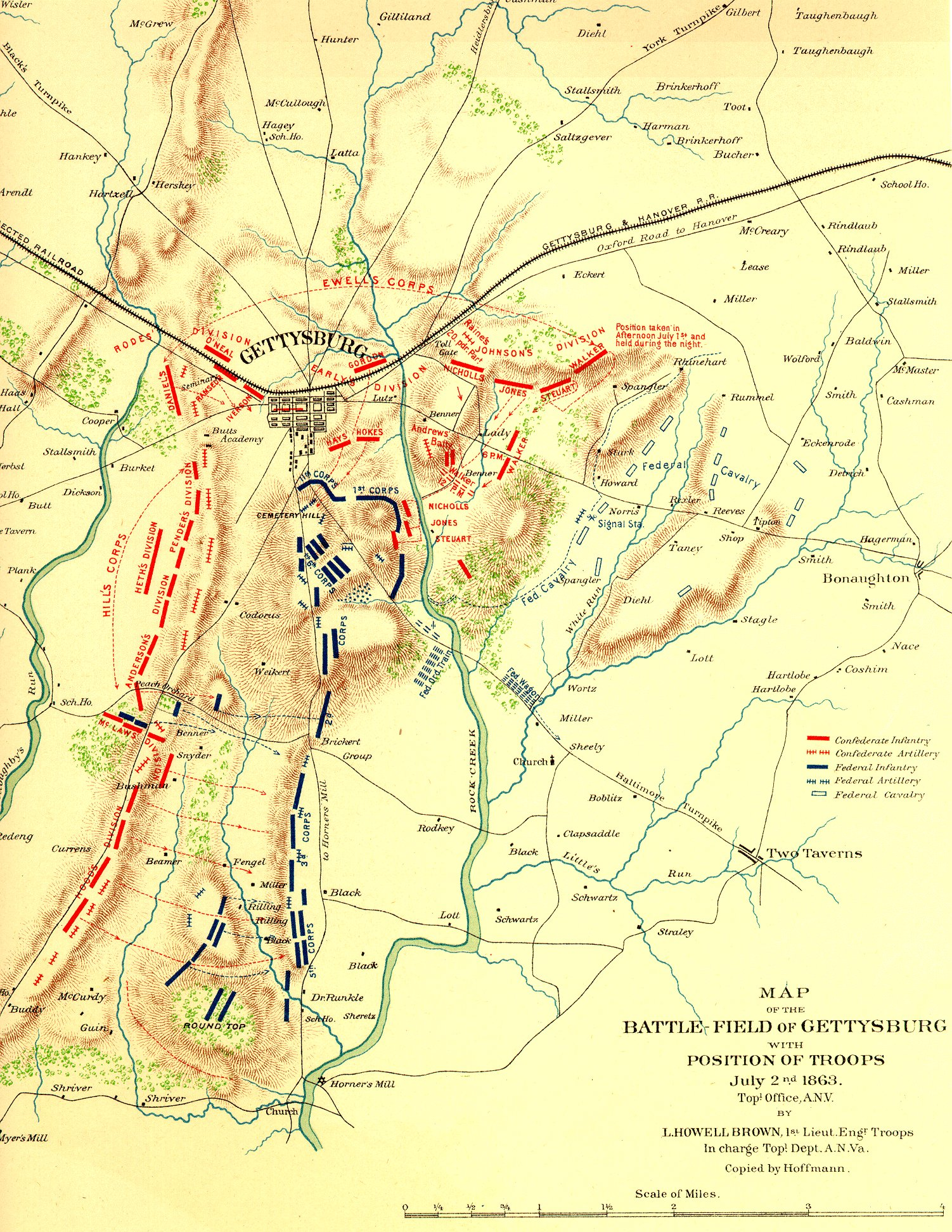
The Taneytown Road was extensively used during the American Civil War (Union troop positions in blue).

In 1808, the county court approved a petition for a road from Gettysburg past Black's Mill on Rock Creek to the road from "Routsough's Mill to Tawney Town", Maryland. In 1841, the first bridge of two 60-foot (18 m) covered spans was built on the creek downstream of the Black's Mill dam, and the bridge and a downstream ford were used by Union troops during the Battle of Gettysburg. From 1894 to 1916, the Gettysburg Electric Railway operated over 800 feet (240 m) of the road on the south slope of Cemetery Hill. Just to the south of the tracks in c. 1903, a battlefield "avenue tablet" was placed to identify the road. After part of the "Taneytown and Gettysburg Road" near the Gettysburg Battlefield was ceded to the United States Department of War in 1905 following Congressional authorization, 2,443 feet (745 m) from the borough line to beyond Meade's headquarters was "reconstructed on the Telford system" (graded and "piked") to a width of 16 feet (4.9 m). A west gate for the Gettysburg National Cemetery was built on Taneytown Road at Cemetery Hill, followed by the nearby entrance gate to the Gettysburg National Military Park designed by Emmor Cope for Grand Central Avenue's north end on the Taneytown Road's west side. In 1915, the portion of the road from Steinwehr Avenue to the United States arsenal was macadamized. In 1928, PA 134 was assigned to its current alignment between the Maryland border and US 15 (now US 15 Bus.), with the section south of Round Top unpaved. By 1930, construction began on the unpaved section. The section under construction was paved in the 1930s.

== Major intersections ==
The entire route is in Adams County.

Location	mi	km	Destinations	Notes
Mount Joy Township	0.000	0.000	Harney Road – Taneytown	Maryland state line; southern terminus
Cumberland Township	4.311	6.938	US 15 – Frederick, Harrisburg	Diamond interchange
Gettysburg	7.463	12.011	US 15 Bus. (Steinwehr Avenue) – Emmitsburg, Gettysburg	Northern terminus
1.000 mi = 1.609 km; 1.000 km = 0.621 mi
