= Battle of Gettysburg, third day cavalry battles =

Battle of the American Civil War

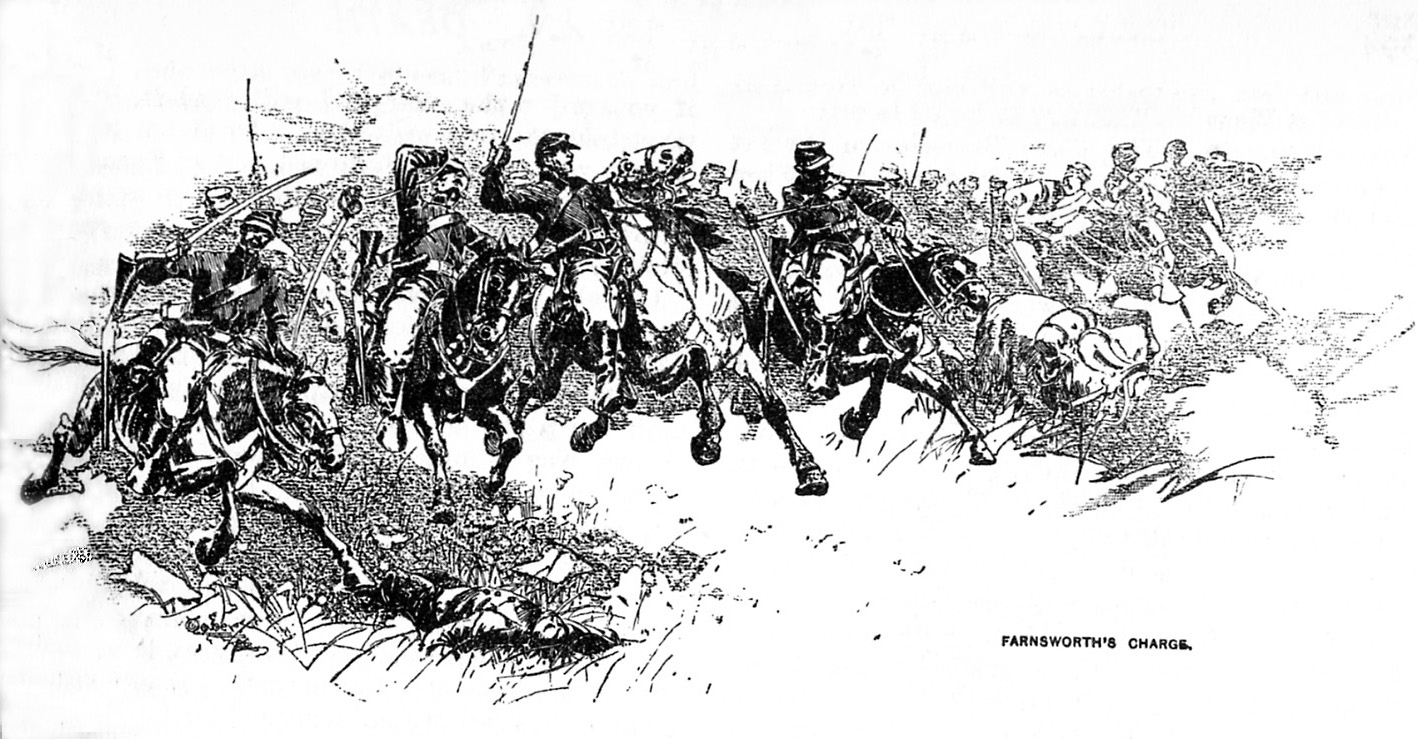
Farnsworth's Charge, Battles and Leaders

On the third day of the Battle of Gettysburg (July 3, 1863) there were two cavalry battles: one approximately three miles (5 km) to the east, in the area known today as East Cavalry Field, the other southwest of the [Big] Round Top mountain (sometimes called South Cavalry Field).

The East Cavalry Field fighting was an attempt by Maj. Gen. J.E.B. Stuart's Confederate cavalry to get into the Federal rear and exploit any success that Pickett's Charge may have generated. Union cavalry under Brig. Gens. David McM. Gregg and George Armstrong Custer repulsed the Confederate advances.

In South Cavalry Field, after Pickett's Charge had been defeated, reckless cavalry charges against the right flank of the Confederate Army, ordered by Brig. Gen. Judson Kilpatrick, were easily repulsed, resulting in the death of Brig. Gen. Elon J. Farnsworth.

== Background and cavalry forces ==
=== Military situation ===
Cavalry forces played a significant role at Gettysburg only on the first and third days of the battle. On the first day (July 1), the Union cavalry division of Brig. Gen. John Buford successfully delayed Confederate infantry forces under Maj. Gen. Henry Heth until Union infantry could arrive on the battlefield. By the end of the day Buford's troopers had retired from the field.

On the Confederate side, most of Maj. Gen. Stuart's cavalry division was absent from the battlefield until late on the second day. Possibly misunderstanding orders from Gen. Robert E. Lee, Stuart had taken his three best brigades of cavalry on a pointless ride around the right flank of the Union Army of the Potomac and had been out of touch with the main body of Lee's Army of Northern Virginia since June 24, depriving Lee of critical intelligence information and screening services. Stuart arrived from Carlisle at Lee's headquarters shortly after noon on July 2 and his exhausted brigades arrived that evening, too late to affect the planning or execution of the second day's battle. Hampton's brigade camped to the north, following a relatively minor clash with Union cavalry at Hunterstown that afternoon.

Lee's orders for Stuart were to prepare for operations on July 3 in support of the Confederate infantry assault against the center of the Union line on Cemetery Ridge. Stuart was to protect the Confederate left flank and attempt to move around the Union right flank and into the enemy's rear. If Stuart's forces could proceed south from the York Pike along the Low Dutch Road, they would soon reach the Baltimore Pike—the main avenue of communications for the Army of the Potomac—and they could launch devastating and demoralizing attacks against the Union rear, capitalizing on the confusion from the assault (Pickett's Charge) that Lee planned for the Union center.

Confederate cavalry forces under Stuart for this operation consisted of the three brigades he had taken on his ride around the Union Army (commanded by Brig. Gen. Wade Hampton, Brig. Gen. Fitzhugh Lee and Col. John Chambliss) and the brigade of Col. Albert G. Jenkins (under the command of Col. Milton J. Ferguson following Jenkins' wounding on July 2). Although these four brigades should have amounted to approximately 5,000 men, it is likely that only 3,430 men and 13 guns saw action that day. And following their nine-day ride around Maryland and Pennsylvania, they and their horses were weary and not in prime condition for battle.

Union cavalry forces were from the corps of Maj. Gen. Alfred Pleasonton, who did not participate directly in the command of any cavalry actions during the Battle of Gettysburg. Since most of Buford's division had retired to Westminster, Maryland (with the exception of his reserve brigade under Brig. Gen. Wesley Merritt, which was deployed directly south of Gettysburg), only two divisions were ready for action. Stationed near the intersection of the Hanover Road and the Low Dutch Road—directly on Stuart's path—was the division of Brig. Gen. David McM. Gregg. Gregg had two brigades present at Gettysburg, under Col. John B. McIntosh and Col. J. Irvin Gregg (David Gregg's cousin), but the latter was stationed on the Baltimore Pike. David Gregg's one-brigade command was supplemented by the newly formed "Michigan Brigade" of Brig. Gen. George Armstrong Custer. Custer was assigned to the division of Brig. Gen. Judson Kilpatrick but happened to be on loan to David Gregg and requested permission from Gregg to join his fight. Altogether, 3,250 Union troopers opposed Stuart. The other brigade from Kilpatrick's division, commanded by Brig. Gen. Elon J. Farnsworth, was stationed to the southwest of the Round Top mountain, the area now known informally as South Cavalry Field.

=== Principal commanders of cavalry at Gettysburg, July 3 ===
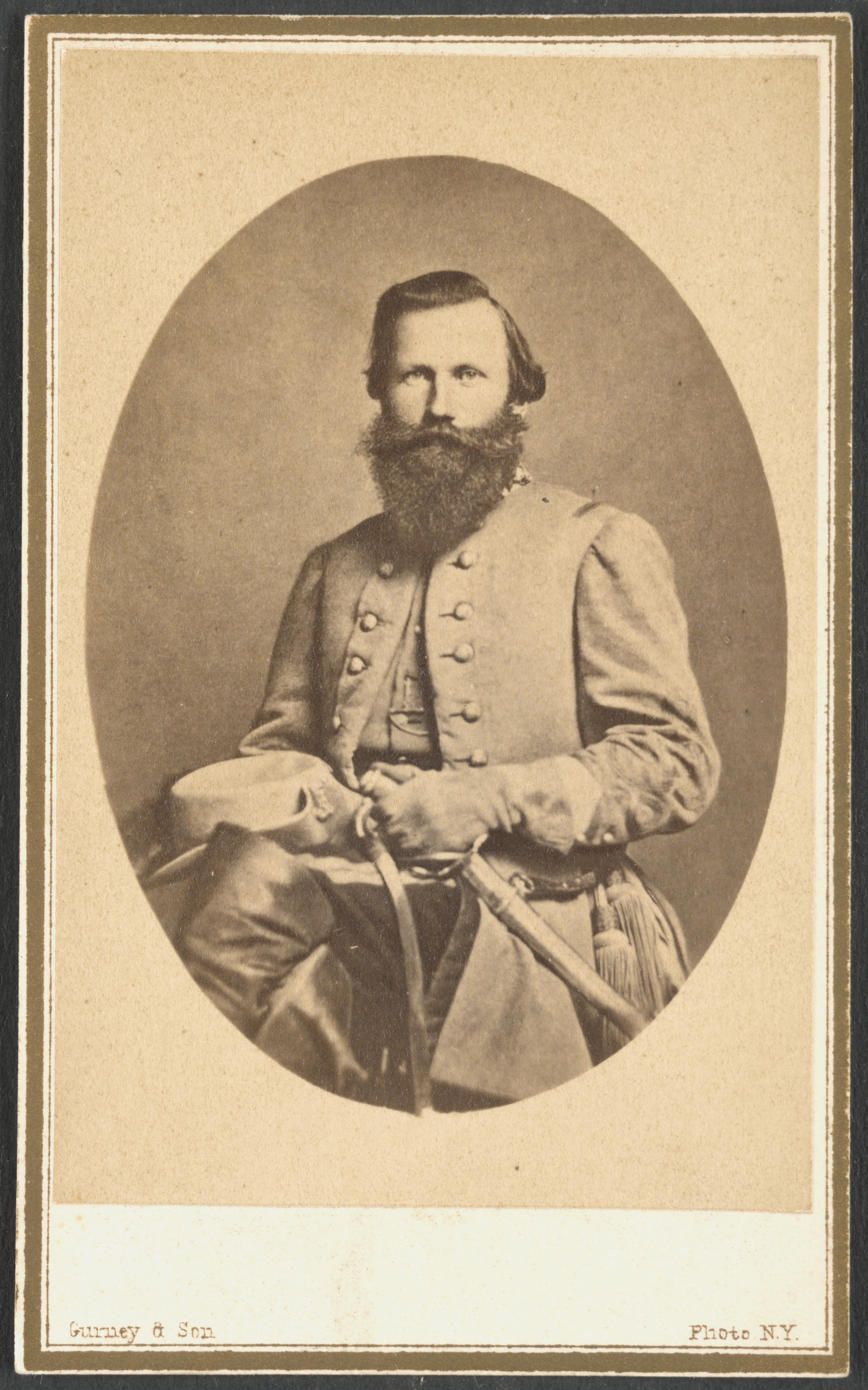
Maj. Gen.
J.E.B. Stuart, CSA

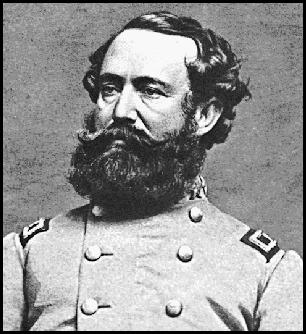
Brig. Gen.
Wade Hampton, CSA

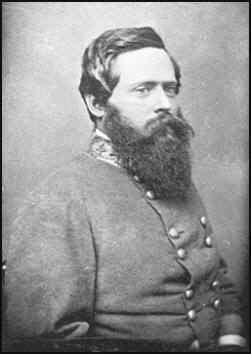
Brig. Gen.
Fitzhugh Lee, CSA

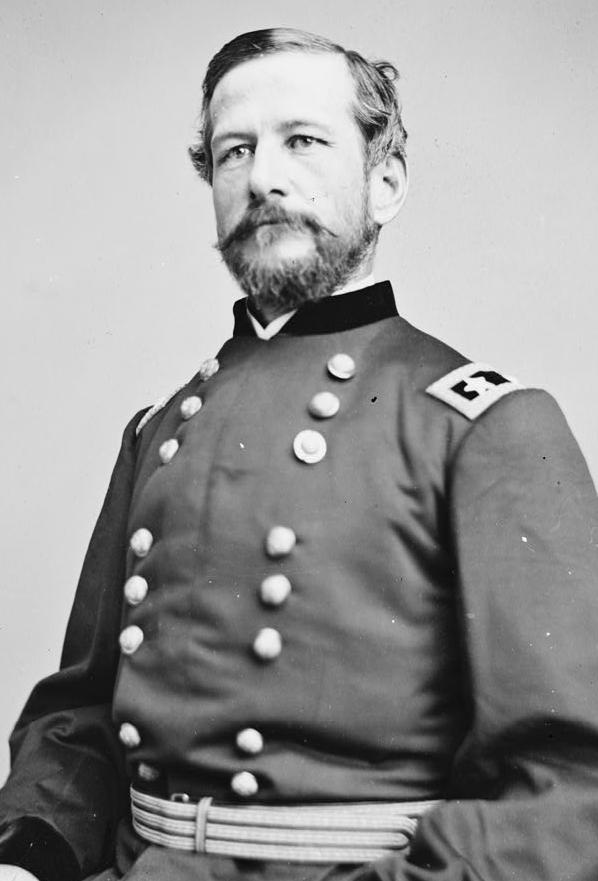
Maj. Gen.
Alfred Pleasonton, USA

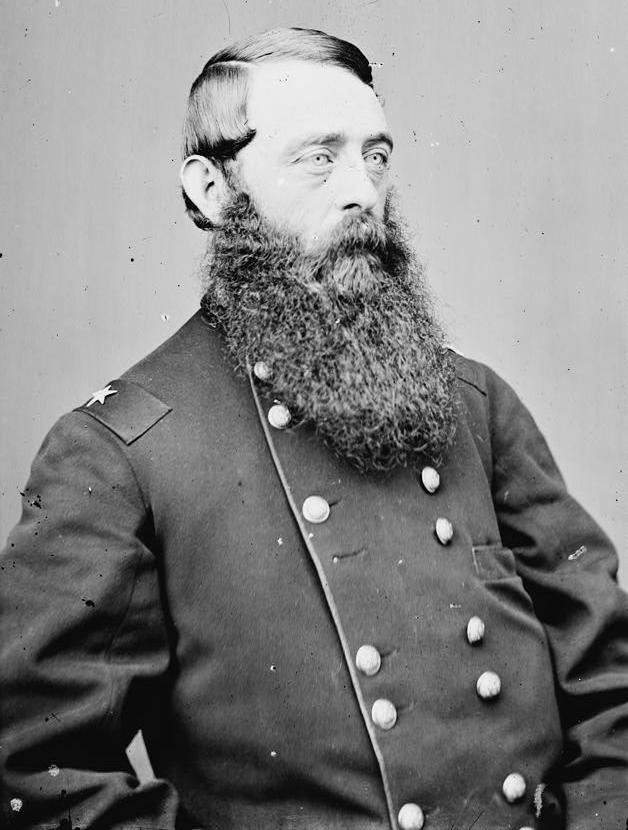
Brig. Gen.
David McM. Gregg, USA

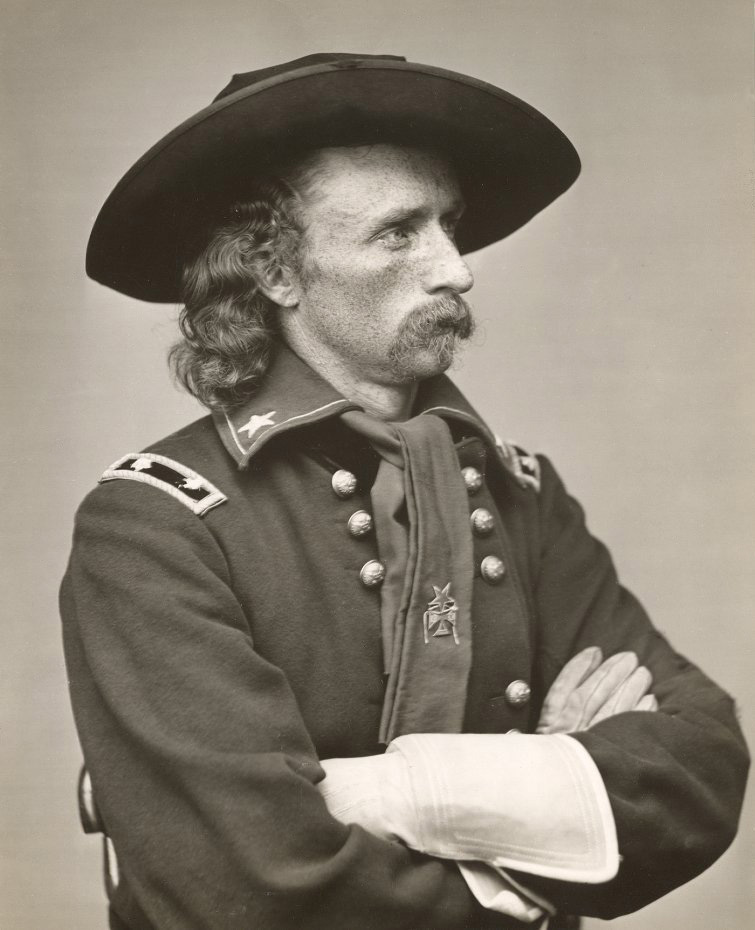
Brig. Gen.
George A. Custer, USA

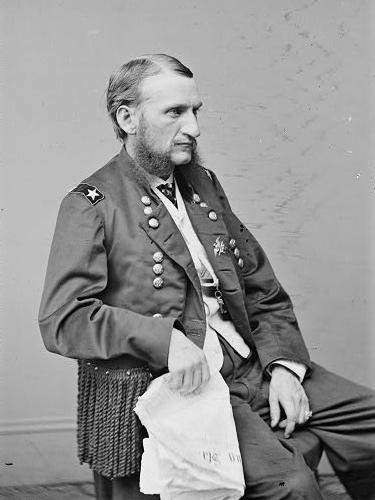
Brig. Gen.
Judson Kilpatrick, USA

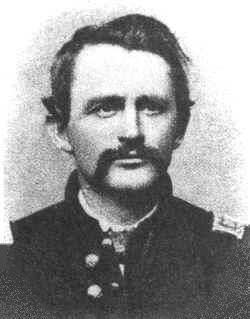
Brig. Gen.
Elon J. Farnsworth, USA

== East Cavalry Field ==
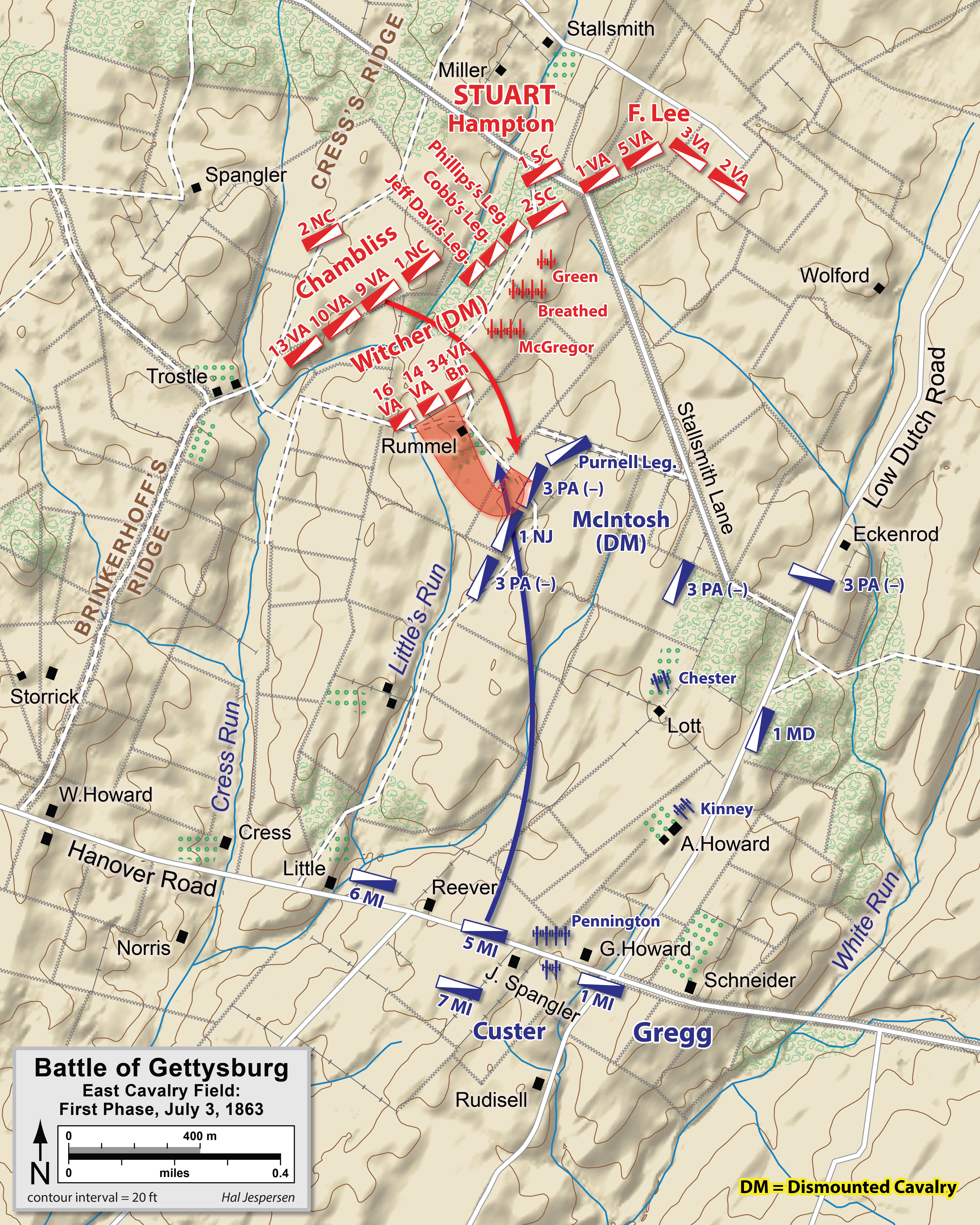
Gettysburg East Cavalry Field, first phase Confederate Union

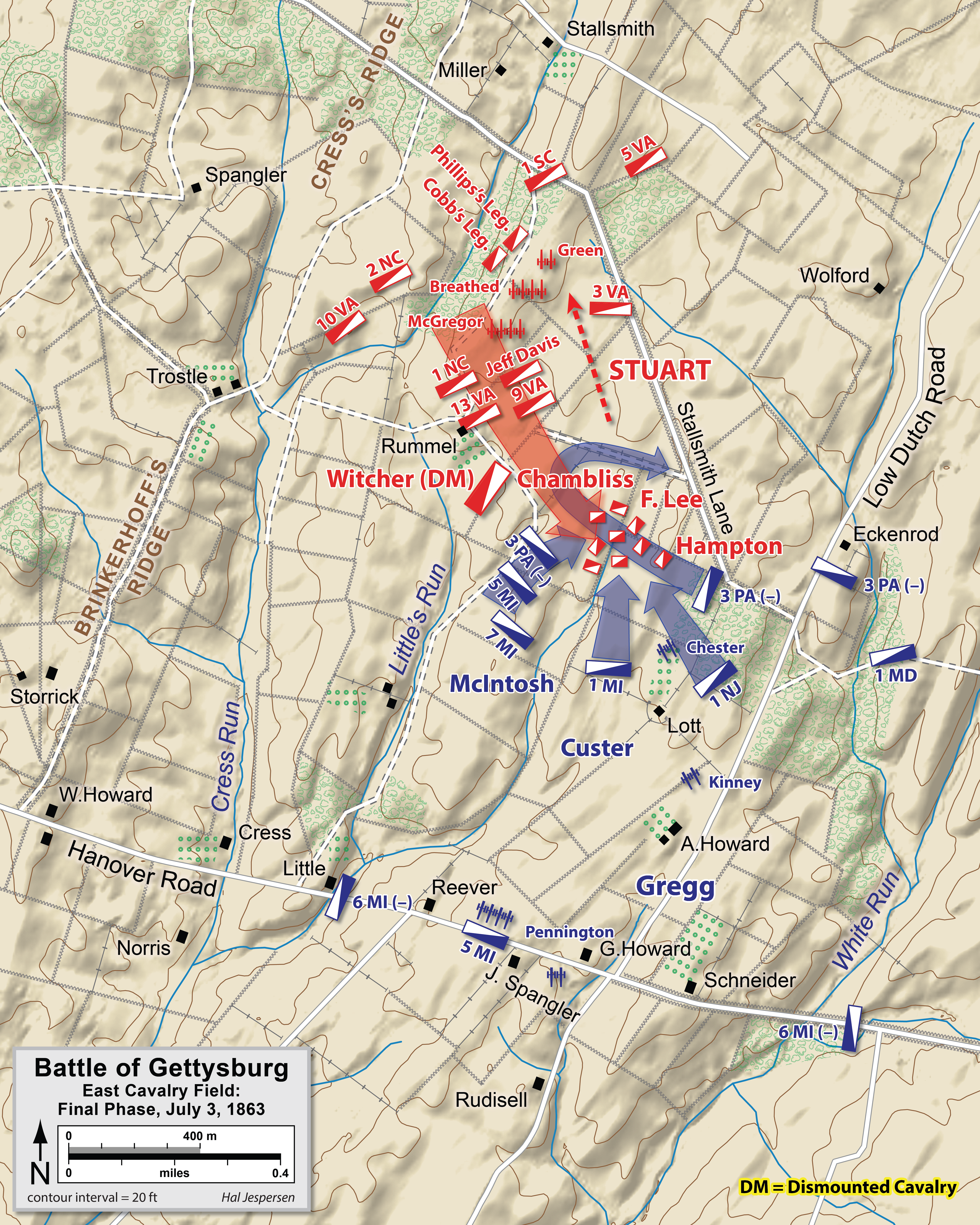
Gettysburg East Cavalry Field, final phase

At about 11:00 a.m. on July 3, Stuart reached Cress Ridge, just north of what is now called East Cavalry Field, and signaled Lee that he was in position by ordering the firing of four guns, one in each direction of the compass. This was a foolish error because he also alerted Gregg to his presence. The brigades of McIntosh and Custer were positioned to block Stuart. As the Confederates approached, Gregg engaged them with an artillery duel and the superior skills of the Union horse artillerymen got the better of Stuart's guns.

Stuart's plan had been to pin down McIntosh's and Custer's skirmishers around the Rummel farm and swing over Cress Ridge, around the left flank of the defenders, but the Federal skirmish line pushed back tenaciously; the troopers from the 5th Michigan Cavalry and two companies of the 6th Michigan Cavalry Regiment were armed with Spencer repeating rifles, multiplying their firepower. Stuart decided on a direct cavalry charge to break their resistance. He ordered an assault by the 1st Virginia Cavalry, his own old regiment, now in Fitz Lee's brigade. The battle started in earnest at approximately 1:00 p.m., at the same time that Col. Edward Porter Alexander's Confederate artillery barrage opened up on Cemetery Ridge. Fitz Lee's troopers came pouring through the farm of John Rummel, scattering the Union skirmish line.

Gregg ordered Custer to counterattack with the 7th Michigan. Custer personally led the regiment, shouting "Come on, you Wolverines!". Waves of horsemen collided in furious fighting along the fence line on Rummel's farm. Seven hundred men fought at point-blank range across the fence with carbines, pistols and sabers. Custer's horse was shot out from under him, and he commandeered a bugler's horse. Eventually enough of Custer's men were amassed to break down the fence, and they caused the Virginians to retreat. Stuart sent in reinforcements from all three of his brigades: the 9th and 13th Virginia (Chambliss' Brigade), the 1st North Carolina and Jeff Davis Legion (Hampton's) and squadrons from the 2nd Virginia (Lee's). Custer's pursuit was broken, and the 7th Michigan fell back in a disorderly retreat.

Stuart tried again for a breakthrough by sending in the bulk of Wade Hampton's brigade, accelerating in formation from a walk to a gallop, sabers flashing, calling forth "murmurs of admiration" from their Union targets. Union horse artillery batteries attempted to block the advance with shell and canister, but the Confederates moved too quickly and were able to fill in for lost men, maintaining their momentum. Once again the cry "Come on, you Wolverines!" was heard as Custer and Col. Charles H. Town led the 1st Michigan Cavalry into the fray, also at a gallop. A trooper from one of Gregg's Pennsylvania regiments observed,

As the two columns approached each other the pace of each increased, when suddenly a crash, like the falling of timber, betokened the crisis. So sudden and violent was the collision that many of the horses were turned end over end and crushed their riders beneath them.

As the horsemen fought desperately in the center, McIntosh personally led his brigade against Hampton's right flank while the 3rd Pennsylvania under Captain William E. Miller and 1st New Jersey hit Hampton's left from north of the Lott house. Hampton received a serious saber wound to the head; Custer lost his second horse of the day. Assaulted from three sides, the Confederates withdrew. The Union troopers were in no condition to pursue beyond the Rummel farmhouse.

The losses from the 40 intense minutes of fighting on East Cavalry Field were relatively minor: 254 Union casualties—219 of them from Custer's brigade—and 181 Confederate. Although tactically inconclusive, the battle was a strategic loss for Stuart and Robert E. Lee, whose plans to drive into the Union rear were foiled.

== South Cavalry Field ==
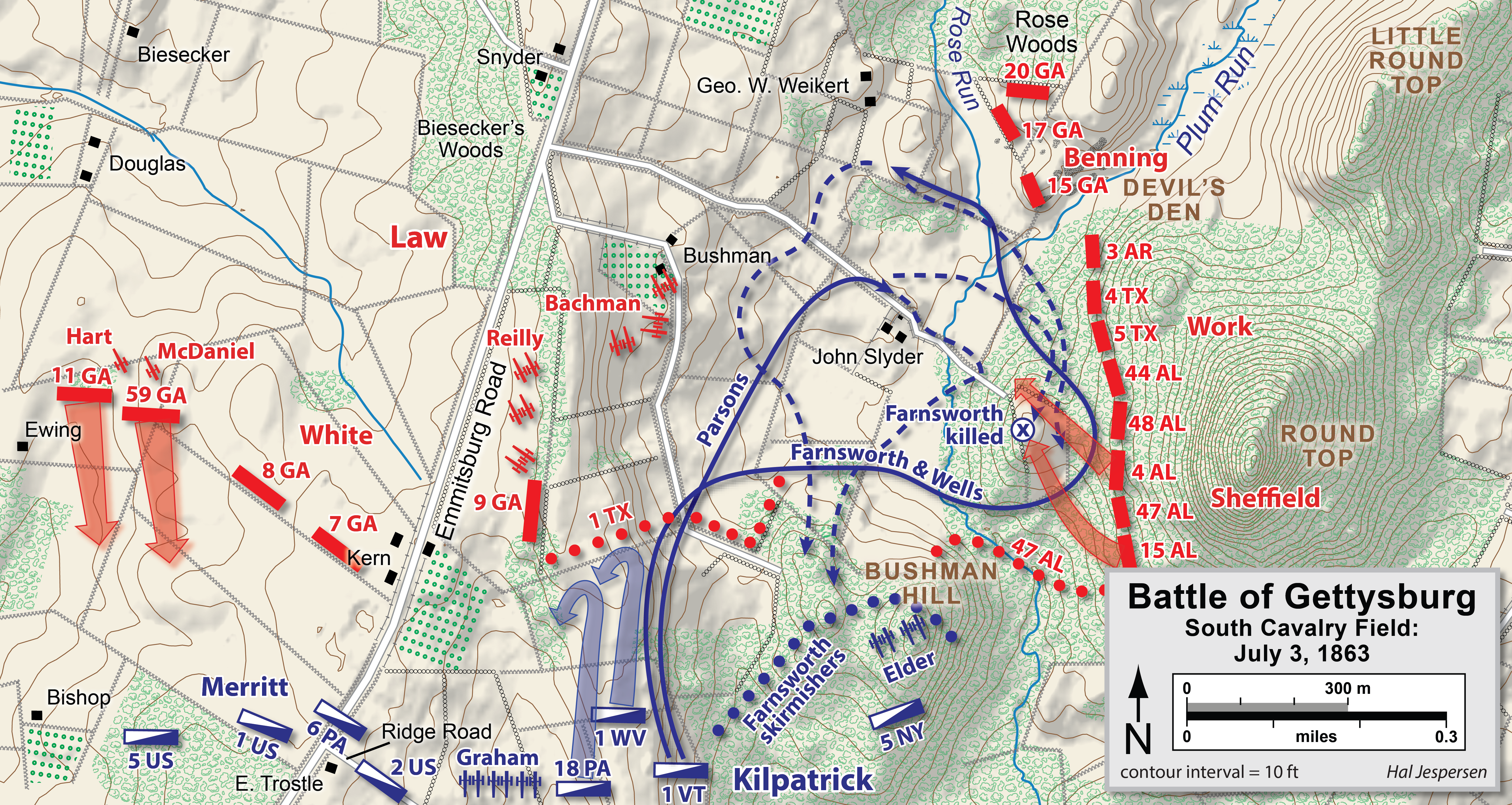
Gettysburg South Cavalry Field

On the morning of July 3 Union Cavalry Corps commander Maj. Gen. Alfred Pleasonton ordered two of his brigades to the left flank of the Union army. He ordered Brig. Gen. Wesley Merritt's Reserve Brigade of Buford's division to move north from Emmitsburg to join Brig. Gen. Judson Kilpatrick's division, moving from Two Taverns on the Baltimore Pike to the area southwest of Round Top. By this time the only brigade in Kilpatrick's division was that of Brig. Gen. Elon J. Farnsworth, Custer's brigade having been detached for service with David Gregg at East Cavalry Field. It is unclear what Pleasonton hoped to accomplish. There is no record that he performed any reconnaissance in this area. It has been speculated that Army of the Potomac commander George G. Meade was preparing for a possible counterattack to follow the repulse of Pickett's Charge, which he had anticipated since the night before.

Farnsworth reached the area at approximately 1:00 p.m., about the time the massive Confederate artillery barrage started in preparation for Pickett's Charge, and his 1,925 troops took up a position in a line south of the George Bushman farm. From left to right, the regiments were the 18th Pennsylvania Cavalry, the 1st West Virginia and 1st Vermont. Battery E, 4th U.S. Artillery, occupied a small, rocky knoll in the rear and the 5th New York cavalry was placed in a nearby ravine to guard the artillery. Joined by Kilpatrick, they awaited Merritt's brigade, which arrived at about 3:00 p.m. and took up a position straddling the Emmitsburg Road, to Farnsworth's left. By this time the infantry portion of Pickett's Charge had begun, and Kilpatrick was eager to get his men into the fight.

On the Confederate line to the east of the Emmitsburg Road, only infantry troops were involved. The four brigades of Hood's division, under the command of Brig. Gen. Evander M. Law, had occupied the area from Round Top, through Devil's Den and back to the road since the battle on July 2. Initially, Law had just the 1st Texas Infantry (from Brig. Gen. Jerome B. Robertson's Texas Brigade) facing Farnsworth to the south, but he soon reinforced them with the 47th Alabama Infantry, the 1st South Carolina and artillery. To the west of the road, facing Merritt, was the Georgia brigade of Brig. Gen. George "Tige" Anderson.

Young Kilpatrick had little experience in commanding cavalry, and he demonstrated that by attacking fortified infantry positions in a piecemeal fashion. West of the road Merritt went in first, with his 6th Pennsylvania cavalrymen fighting dismounted. Anderson's Georgians repulsed their attack easily. Farnsworth was to follow, but he was astonished to hear Kilpatrick's order for a mounted cavalry charge. The Confederate defenders were positioned behind a stone fence with wooden fence rails piled high above it, too high for horses to jump, which would require the attackers to dismount under fire and dismantle the fence. The terrain leading to it was broken, undulating ground, with large boulders, fences and woodlots, making it unsuitable for a cavalry charge. Accounts differ as to the details of the argument between Farnsworth and Kilpatrick, but it is generally believed that Kilpatrick dared or shamed Farnsworth into making the charge the latter knew would be suicidal. Farnsworth allegedly said, "General, if you order the charge I will lead it, but you must take the awful responsibility."

First in the assault was the 1st West Virginia Cavalry, led by Col. Nathaniel P. Richmond. They rode in great confusion after coming under heavy fire from the 1st Texas, but they were able to breach the wall. Hand-to-hand fighting with sabers, rifles and even rocks ensued, but the attack was forced back. Of the 400 Federal cavalrymen in the attack, there were 98 casualties. The second wave came from the 18th Pennsylvania, supported by companies of the 5th New York, but they were also turned back under heavy rifle fire, with 20 casualties.

It was finally the turn of the 1st Vermont Cavalry, about 400 officers and men, which Farnsworth divided into three battalions of four companies each under Lt. Col. Addison W. Preston, Maj. William Wells and Capt. Henry C. Parsons. Parsons' battalion led the charge, passing the Texans and riding north toward the John Slyder farm. Evander Law sent three Georgia regiments (the 9th, 11th and 59th) to move to the support of the Texans and the artillery batteries. A staff officer carrying the order encountered the 4th Alabama, which also joined in support. An Alabama lieutenant yelled, "Cavalry, boys, cavalry! This is no fight, only a frolic, give it to them!" And the infantrymen found many easy targets.

All three battalion advances were turned back with great losses. The final group, led by Wells and Farnsworth, circled back toward Big Round Top, where they met a line of the 15th Alabama across their front. Farnsworth's party had dwindled to only ten troopers as they weaved back and forth, trying to avoid the murderous fire. Farnsworth fell from his horse, struck in the chest, abdomen and leg by five bullets. Postwar accounts by a Confederate soldier who claimed Farnsworth committed suicide with his pistol to avoid capture have been discounted. Maj. Wells received the Medal of Honor for his heroism in leading the rest of his men back to safety. The Vermont regiment suffered 65 casualties during the futile assault.

Kilpatrick's ill-considered and poorly executed cavalry charges are remembered as a low point in the history of the U.S. cavalry and marked the final significant hostilities at the Battle of Gettysburg. Six miles (10 km) west of Gettysburg one of Merritt's regiments, the 6th U.S. Cavalry, was defeated that afternoon at Fairfield by Brig. Gen. William E. "Grumble" Jones' "Laurel Brigade," an action not considered to be a formal part of the Battle of Gettysburg but one that had a critical role in the retreat of Lee's army.

All of Pleasonton's cavalry brigades were exercised for the remainder of the Gettysburg campaign in the lackluster pursuit of Lee's army back across the Potomac River.
