= Willoughby Run =

Coordinates: 39°47′05″N 77°16′37″W

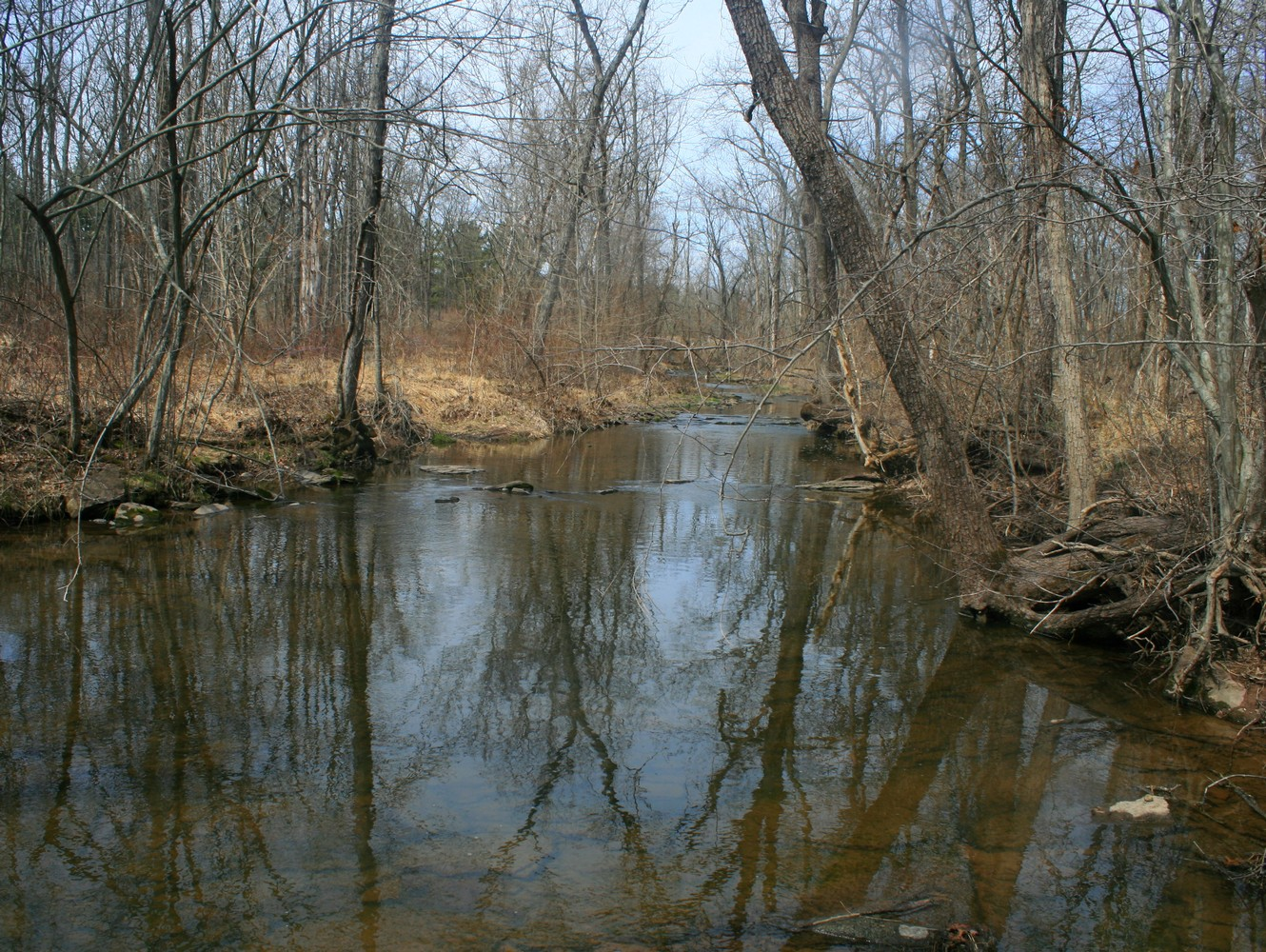

Location
- Country: United States
- State: Pennsylvania
- Region: Adams County
- Township: Cumberland

Willoughby Run is a tributary of Marsh Creek in Adams County, Pennsylvania in the United States.

Willoughby Run flows southward between Herr Ridge and McPherson Ridge through the Gettysburg Battlefield.
