= List of Gettysburg Battlefield camps after the American Civil War =

Gettysburg Battlefield camps after the American Civil War were used by the Pennsylvania National Guard, Civil War veterans, the US Marine Corps, the Civilian Conservation Corps, the US Army, and the Youth Conservation Corps.

Chronology
Date	Event
1865-07-04	The 50th Pennsylvania Infantry encamped on Culp's Hill for the Soldiers' National Monument cornerstone ceremony (Capt. Hull's camp for the commissary was on Stevens Knoll.)
1869-07	Attorney David McConaughy, a Captain of the "Adams Rifles", organized the first veteran's reunion at Gettysburg, and distinguished visitors were hosted at the new Springs Hotel which opened June 28.
1872	The G. A. R. reunion for the Pennsylvania division "in the grove adjacent to the Springs Hotel" had only ~200 attendees.
1878	The first Grand Army of the Republic (G. A. R.) national encampment at the battlefield included "hayrides, sack races, band concerts, balloon ascensions, picnics, and dances as well as less-reserved activities."
1882-07-22	Camp Burnside of the G. A. R. was on East Cemetery Hill after the June 14 officers' reunion by John B. Bachelder for surveying sites of the Battle of Gettysburg, Second Day.
1883	Camp Geary was the G. A. R. encampment on East Cemetery Hill.
1884-08-02	Camp Gettysburg of the Pennsylvania National Guard extending from Seminary Ridge over the field of Pickett's Charge was outfitted by the new Round Top Branch.
1885-05-04	President Grover Cleveland's special train arrived at the depot for the First Corps reunion and was given a battlefield tour by John B. Bachelder after a visit to the Gettysburg National Cemetery.
1885-08-04	Burgess William H. Tipton issued a proclamation for the G. A. R. encampment, August 8–16; and the town erected an arch at the square for the arrival parade.
1886-08-06	Camp Hancock opened for the G. A. R. reunion on East Cemetery Hill (the Third US Artillery camped at The Wheatfield).
1886	US Artillery Battery C (60 men, 80 horses, 6 guns) encamped in The Wheatfield for the dedication of the Reynolds Monument in Herbst Woods.
1887	The G. A. R. encampment on East Cemetery Hill was lit by "a 25-light dynamo…in the Battle Mill."
1888-07	For the 25th Battle of Gettysburg anniversary "Grand Reunion of the Blue and the Gray", Pennsylvania Civil War veterans encamped on East Cemetery Hill, the NJ National Guard was in The Wheatfield (as was Col Campbell), and the WI National Guard was in Reynolds Grove.
1889-09-07	Camp Samuel Harper was the "Grand Army of the Republic and the Veteran Association" camp from East Cemetery Hill to Slocum Av (picnics at Reynolds Grove, Round Top Park, and Spangler Spring).
1890-08-30	Camp Abe Patterson of the PA G. A. R. opened with August 31 religious services at the Gettysburg Rostrum and a ceremony at the Sixth New-York Cavalry Monument.
1892-07-02	The G. A. R. encampment opened on East Cemetery Hill: "The usual programme…including dress parade in the evenings followed by concert. Pic-Nics, burlesque parades and other amusements…".
1893-07-15	The G. A. R. encampment of 700-1000 tents was planned on East Cemetery Hill after the New York memorial dedication on July 2.
1894-06-30	Camp McCartney for the Department of Pennsylvania G. A. R. began on East Cemetery Hill with 400 tents and "a new flag staff" at headquarters.
1894-08-11	Camp Crawford Camp Samuel W. Crawford laid out by the Corps of Engineers was the 28th Infantry (Keystone) "Division Encampment at Gettysburg" through August 18 with a burlesque parade.
1896-05-15	Federal law (29 Stat. 120) approved use of national parks for military camps after the Gettysburg National Military Park had been designated in 1895.
1898-09-28	Camp Snyder on the west of Seminary Ridge and south of the Fairfield Road was the 2nd WV Regiment encampment for the dedication of 4 West Virginia monuments. The WV baseball team defeated the Pennsylvania College team 9-8 before continuing to New Oxford for a bivouac at Camp Pfeiffer and to York, Pennsylvania.
1900	Camp Costello at Round Top Park was the Tacony Rifles' encampment.
1901	The "largest encampment ever held by the" Union Veterans League was held "on this historic battlefield".
1901-07-01	Through July 31, the US cavalry and artillery camp commanded by General Witherspoon was on 320 acres (1.3 km^{2}) east of Rock Creek and south of the York/Hunterstown Rd intersection.
1902-07-02	Camp George G. Meade was established from the Catholic cemetery over the field of Pickett's Charge to the Wheatfield Road (US Cavalry and Artillery arrived on July 11 to camp at McPherson Ridge).
1904-05-29	Artillery (3rd Battery) and 15th Cavalry soldiers arrived to encamp for the Decoration Day address by Theodore Roosevelt.
1904-06-04	Two troops of the 15th Cavalry en route to Fort Myer encamped at Spangler's Spring.
1904-06-11	The 38th G. A. R. encampment began at the Gettysburg Battlefield (the 1st convention in 1866 was held at Philadelphia.)
1904-07-21	Camp Quay setup began along the Emmitsburg Rd, with a PA National Guard unit beginning at the Sherfy farm, with the Third Brigade from the trolley wye into Tawney Field on Washington St (edge of town), and with the cavalry & artillery along the Chambersburg pike (drill grounds east of Reynolds Av). The summer camp ended on July 30, and the camp's water was pumped from the Gettysburg Water Works.
1906-07-16	Camp Henderson of the PA National Guard used 95 acres (0.38 km^{2}) in McMillan Woods and the Trostle, Klingel, Sherfy, McPherson, and Codori farms for the encampment through July 16. Maneuvers were conducted from Zeigler's Grove to Devil's Den. (the joint maneuver camp followed at Mount Gretna's Camp Roosevelt.)
1908-07-23	Camp Alexander Hays, Jr, including Pennsylvania Governor Stuart's tent, was struck by lightning, and the camp was flooded by the storm (3 killed, 40 injured of the 10,000 soldiers from July 16–25).
1909-05-30	The camp for the US Regulars monument dedication opened at The Angle for a Fifteenth cavalry sq, a Third field artillery battalion, a Fifth infantry regiment, and the Coast artillery's 13 companies & band.
1910-06-28	Troops arrived for the Camp of Instruction (United States maneuver camp), which in addition to students, had 10,832 regulars and militiamen. On July 31, the "Columbia militia and U. S. regulars broke camp" on the hill east of town (Third U. S. Artillery batteries returned to Fort Myer).
1910-08-10	Camp Gobin of the National Guard opened at the 1909 campsite on the field of Pickett's Charge, the Diehl Farm, the Spangler Farm, and the Trostle Farm. YMCA tents were available, and the maneuver area was southward from Big Round Top to Harper's Hill.
1912-07-31	Camp Stuart Camp Edwin S. Stuart of 7000 PA National Guardsmen was held just south of the Peach Orchard. Pennsylvania's only licensed pilot demonstrated a Curtiss Biplane. The airfield was near W Confederate Avenue. A "fully equipped field hospital" was first used during this encampment.
1913-02-01	Water wells were being drilled at the planned Great Camp for the 50th Battle of Gettysburg anniversary.
1913-06-22	Camp General O. O. Howard for the 9th annual convention of Sons of Veterans Reserves opened on the northeast edge of Gettysburg.
1913-06-25	The annual encampment for the PA Grand Army of the Republic opened and lasted until June 28. Many of these men made up the 21,000 who arrived at the 1913 Gettysburg reunion at Great Camp on June 29, instead of the 6,000 expected for the 1st day.
1913-07-02	Six American Civil War veterans at the Great Camp of the 1913 Gettysburg reunion died since June 29, due to effects of heat and age.
1913-07-07	Following a May 10 Army address to college/university presidents, the War Department's Camp of Instruction began at the Newspaper Row ("Meadeboro") facility of the reunion. Captain Robert O. Van Horn had organized the camp, which continued through August 15. In addition to 250 college students, military units included 1 artillery battery, 1 cavalry troop, 1 engineer company, and 4 infantry companies.
1913-07-23	The US Marine Corps conducted an officer's training school at Gettysburg College.
1915	The United States arsenal was located along the Taneytown Rd (by October 1914, the PA National Guard arsenal/commissary along the Round Top Branch had been razed.)
1917-05-22	Camp, US Troops The War Dept notified the Gettysburg Park Commission that "recruiting stations" would be established at the park. "Camp, United States Troops, Gettysburg, PA" ("Gettysburg Camp" colloq.) was 99 acres (0.40 km^{2}) on three farms and a "three-cornered field" west of the Emmitsburg Rd/Round Top Branch intersection. The first sites used were the Codori farm and "a tract along the Round Top branch". The new buildings took 1 million feet of lumber.
1917-06-02	The Fourth United States Regulars arrived at the "Gettysburg Camp", which included a post office.
1917-11-26	A small detachment was the remaining unit at the recruit training camp, which had closed by December 16. (Sgt Brannigan, who arrived with the "Fourth Infantry" in 1917, was stationed here until 1919). (Note: "Army Post Here Thing of Past". August 6, 1919. The facility included buildings, water system, and drill and parade grounds.)
1918	A new Pennsylvania College building was built for the Students Army Training Corps "as though they were at camp".
1918-03-02	Over one dozen military truck trains on the Lincoln Highway traveled eastward through Gettysburg.
1918-03-06	Camp Colt was the Tank Corps' "preliminary training" facility ("310th Tank Center" by October). It was established at the "Camp, U.S. Troops, Gettysburg, PA" in the field of Pickett's Charge. (The camp was named for Samuel Colt by the last week of February).—and occupied 200 acres (0.81 km^{2}) by December. On March 24, Capt Garner transferred the camp's command to Captain Dwight D. Eisenhower. It was his first command.
1918-04-06	Six World War I truck trains, totalling 200 trucks and 42 cars, convoyed through Gettysburg from evening until noon to an "Atlantic port".
1918-07-01	The only "camp for Tank Corps troops", Camp Colt consisted of "176 acres of the Codori farm, 10 acres of the Smith farm, and 6 acres of the Bryan House place" and included an Officer's Training School.
1918-09-30	A Camp Colt quarantine was implemented for the 1918 flu pandemic. In September, the camp had reached a peak of 10,600 officers and men.
1918-12-01	Camp Colt's 200 acres (0.81 km^{2}) on the Codori, Trostle, Smith, and Brian farms held fewer than 6000 soldiers following post-Armistice Day transfers.
1919-05-17	A Liberty Loan Drive volunteer was given a flight from the Camp Colt landing field in a "Curtiss Acrobatic Aeroplane" by an Air Service pilot, who had downed a German bomber over Reims Cathedral.
1919-06-30	Camp Colt had a very small guard under the Quartermaster Corps and closed August 15. In August 1932, the 1st Camp Colt reunion was held at Gettysburg.
1919-07-06	1919 convoys The 1919 Motor Transport Corps convoy's lead car notified the borough that the convoy would arrive to camp the next day, (e.g., "northwest of the Philadelphia and Reading Station") and demonstrate the searchlight at night on Nixon Field. Delayed by covered bridges at Emmitsburg and Middle Creek, the convoy instead continued from a Greenmount welcome ceremony to camp at Chambersburg.
1919-08-16	The 1919 Air Service Transcontinental Recruiting Convoy of the All American Pathfinders squadron encamped at the former corral of Camp Colt (the drill ground was used as the landing field).
1919-09-27	A truck convoy from Camp Holabird parked along the Emmitsburg Road for an overnight stay.
1920	The Camp Wildwood boys club from the Pittsburgh metropolitan area encamped at Pennsylvania College and selected a battlefield location for a memorial tree to General Frederick Hartranft.
1922-07-05	Camp Harding of 5000 troops ended on Seminary Ridge after the East Coast Marine Expeditionary Force reenacted Pickett's Charge (the President viewed from the "Ziegler's Grove Observation Tower".)
1922-10-02	Fifty officers from Carlisle Barracks encamped at Spangler Woods through October 4.
1922-07-02	200 Reserve Officer Training Corps students from the Edgewood Arsenal arrived and quartered in the College gymnasium before establishing a camp through July 4.
1928-01-01	The Gettysburg Airport certificate of occupancy was granted for the airstrip on Oak Ridge's west slope.
1928-05-26	The 6th Field Artillery Battery F and 3rd Cavalry Troop E arrived to encamp at Culp's Hill in preparation for escorting President Calvin Coolidge during the Gettysburg Memorial Day parade.
1928	A Boy Scout camping competition was held at Spangler Spring.
1928-07-28	Engineers from Fort DuPont arrived for the Experimental Motorized Force camp on the Wheatfield for the convoy of 1,100 men and officers for the convoy from Fort Leonard Wood using obsolete trucks.
1928-10-10	25 tanks and military men of Fort Leonard Wood's 4th tank corps encamped at Pardee Field. (on November 18, a record 30 mph (48 km/h) tank of the fort travelled to and from the battlefield).
1928-10-13	300 soldiers of the 12th Infantry from Camp Washington, Maryland, encamped at The Wheatfield, east of the Battlefield Airport.
1929	The Wheatfield encampments included 40 Reserve Officers from Camp Holabird (July 16) and the 1st Tank Regiment from Fort Meade (October 28), and Boy Scouts camped at Pardee Field on various dates.
1930-05-28	After quartermasters enlarged the Gettysburg Rostrum, Cavalry arrived to camp by the Eddie Plank gym as Herbert Hoover's Memorial Day escort (21-gun salute from the Stevens Knoll artillery camp).
1932	A Bonus Expeditionary Force camp was along the Taneytown Road near the Gettysburg National Cemetery.
1933-06-10	CCC camps The Civilian Conservation Corps (CCC) established camp NP-1 in Pitzer Woods (45 tents by July 3), and the facility was named "Camp Renaissance" by October.
1934-02-03	CCC camp NP-2 had opened in McMillan Woods (Charles Heilman was the 1936 commander).
1934-03-02	CCC workers detonated a cannonball from the 1863 battle. During the year, the CCC sawed 55,000 feet of battlefield lumber.
1935-07-19	The "local C. C. C. nine" was defeated by "Doc" Crist's Gettysburg Old Timers on the playground.
1935	The 1st G. A. R. encampment at Gettysburg since 1929 was held.
1937-04	Camp Renaissance with CCC Company #385-C in Pitzer Woods closed (Frank J. Slonaker, former president of the battlefield guide association, had been the camp's service officer).
1938-03 40	Chemical battalion soldiers from Edgewood Arsenal camped at the former Pitzer Woods CCC camp.
1938-07-03	The veterans camp of the 1938 Gettysburg reunion was near Oak Ridge, and the Third Corps camp was near The Angle.
1940	1000 NY National Guardsmen encamped at the former Pitzer Woods CCC camp, Gettysburg High School, borough engine house, tourist cabins, and other locations.
1940	The Keystone Girls' first camp was on Oak Hill at the Eternal Light Peace Memorial.
1940-06-10	A Boy Scout camporee was held at the former Pitzer Woods CCC camp.
1941-05-22	A Fort Indiantown Gap unit encamped at Pitzer Woods and conducted aerial reconnaissance training (communications links were established between the camp, Big Round Top, and Powers Hill.)
1941-06-22	The Sons of Union Veterans of the Civil War encamped at "the armory on the battlefield" and presented a "memorial marble bench" to the War Department.
1941-06-27	The 75th PA G. A. R. encampment ended at Gettysburg (only 3 Union Army veterans attended).
1941-07-05	The 71st Coast Artillery Regiment, successor of the 71st PA Inf, camped for 4 nights with about 850 puptents (and black retriever mascot "Sergeant Bosco") at the Pitzer Woods camp for maneuvers on the battlefield and for Longstreet Day, and the searchlight was used from Barlow Knoll. The 15-mile-long convoy from Fort Story had 300 vehicles and 1700 officers/men and used the former Camp Renaissance.
1941-07-28	The 68th Coast Artillery (AA) had breakfast and held ceremonies at Pitzer Woods.
1941-10-14	Troops from Camp Bevins, Massachusetts, bivouacked south of the Emmitsburg Rd entrance station en route to Fort Bragg.
1941-12	The 44th Infantry Division with 15,000 troops and 2,500 vehicles bivouacked on the battlefield en route to Fort Dix (also in 1941, Vermont infantry used the former CCC camp).
1942-03	The McMillan Woods CCC camp was to be abandoned after becoming the 1st under an "all colored staff" in 1939.
1942	CPTP school The Gettysburg School of Aeronautics of the Civilian Pilot Training Program trained Temple University students camped along the Emmitsburg Road.
1943-11-09	Camp Sharpe opened in Pitzer Woods at the former Camp Renaissance to conduct psychological operations training.
1944-06	The Prisoner of War stockade opened along the Emmitsburg Rd at the former Camp Colt site (guards slept at the high school). By September 16 the stockade had 350 prisoners, and the Gettysburg Armory had an additional 100 prisoners.
1944-08-01	Camp Sharpe closed after the 2nd, 3rd, 4th, and 5th Mobile Radio Broadcasting Companies had shipped out for the June Normandy Campaign.
1944-11-15	POWs moved to the former McMillan Woods CCC camp converted to the Gettysburg WWII POW Camp to replace the stockade.
1945	The Lee-Meade Inn camp for the War Mapping project analyzed captured Japanese documents to create maps for the planned Operation Downfall invasion on November 1.
1946-04-13	Only guards remained at the Gettysburg POW Camp.
1946-07-16	A labor camp of Bahamians began at the former Pitzer Woods camp used for Camp Renaissance & Camp Sharpe.
1948	The Gettysburg College ROTC conducted a demonstration at Oak Ridge.
1949-08-09	The site of the former POW camp was used for the camporee of the Black Walnut Boy Scout district.
1949-09-20	The 95th Chemical Service company (172 men at Pitzer Woods) and the 59th Chemical Maintenance company (70 at Pardee Field) from Edgewood Arsenal encamped through October 8.
1953-09	The Ground Observation Corps station opened on Benner Hill at the battlefield's Latimer Avenue.
1966	Boy Scout summer camps formerly held at Pardee Field began at McMillan Woods.
1971	Camp Eisenhower Camp Eisenhower of the Youth Conservation Corps opened along the Emmitsburg Road for its first summer.
1974	Camp Eisenhower participants removed a house foundation at Little Round Top.
1976-06-26	The Bicentennial Wagon Train stopped overnight at the camping area of the Barlow Knoll Farm, which had been cleaned by the Camp Eisenhower YCC participants.
1989	Improvements were completed at the McMillan Woods Youth Campground for hosting 5500 campers each year.
2003	"Living-history" encampments had become routine tourist attractions within the borough of Gettysburg, Pennsylvania (e.g., at the Gettysburg Wax Museum).
2010	The 1938 Gettysburg Armory listed on the National Register of Historic Places in 1990 was vacated by Battery B, 1/108th Field Artillery.

== See also ==
- Camp Letterman
- East Cemetery Hill
- Consecration of the National Cemetery at Gettysburg
