= Experimental Motorized Force =

Former United States military unit

The Experimental Motorized Forces were United States Army units formed to use post-World War I military transportation tactics.

The first of these units was assembled on July 1, 1928, at Fort Meade (at the time known as "Fort Leonard Wood") near Baltimore, Maryland, and deployed on July 17 for United States Department of War officers. It formed a 42 mi (68 km) convoy 8 mi (13 km) long with 240 vehicles and 1,100 men to Upper Marlboro, Maryland. Subsequent convoys from the Fort included one 6 mi (9.7 km) long that camped on the Gettysburg Battlefield on July 31; one with 300 men and 96 vehicles to Tobyhanna Artillery Range via Pottstown, Pennsylvania, on August 14, and another to Gettysburg on October 11.

The Experimental Motorized Force to Tobyhanna included a gasoline-electric bus, 1,050 men, and 45 officers with "the first armored troop (cavalry); one rifle company of infantry; one machine gun company of infantry; one battery of field artillery and detachments of engineers, ordnance, and signal troops. They will be in light armored cars, trucks, passenger cars, cross-country cars, and light tank trucks. On its way north the armored car units will engage in a tactical reconnaissance, splitting into four sections and reconnoitering to the front and flanks of the column along different routes."

The majority of the Experimental Motorized Force vehicles were obsolete, and the convoys were conducted nearly a decade after the Transcontinental Motor Convoys of the Air Service and the Motor Transport Corps such as the 1919 Motor Transport Corps convoy.
