= Gettysburg Spring Railroad =

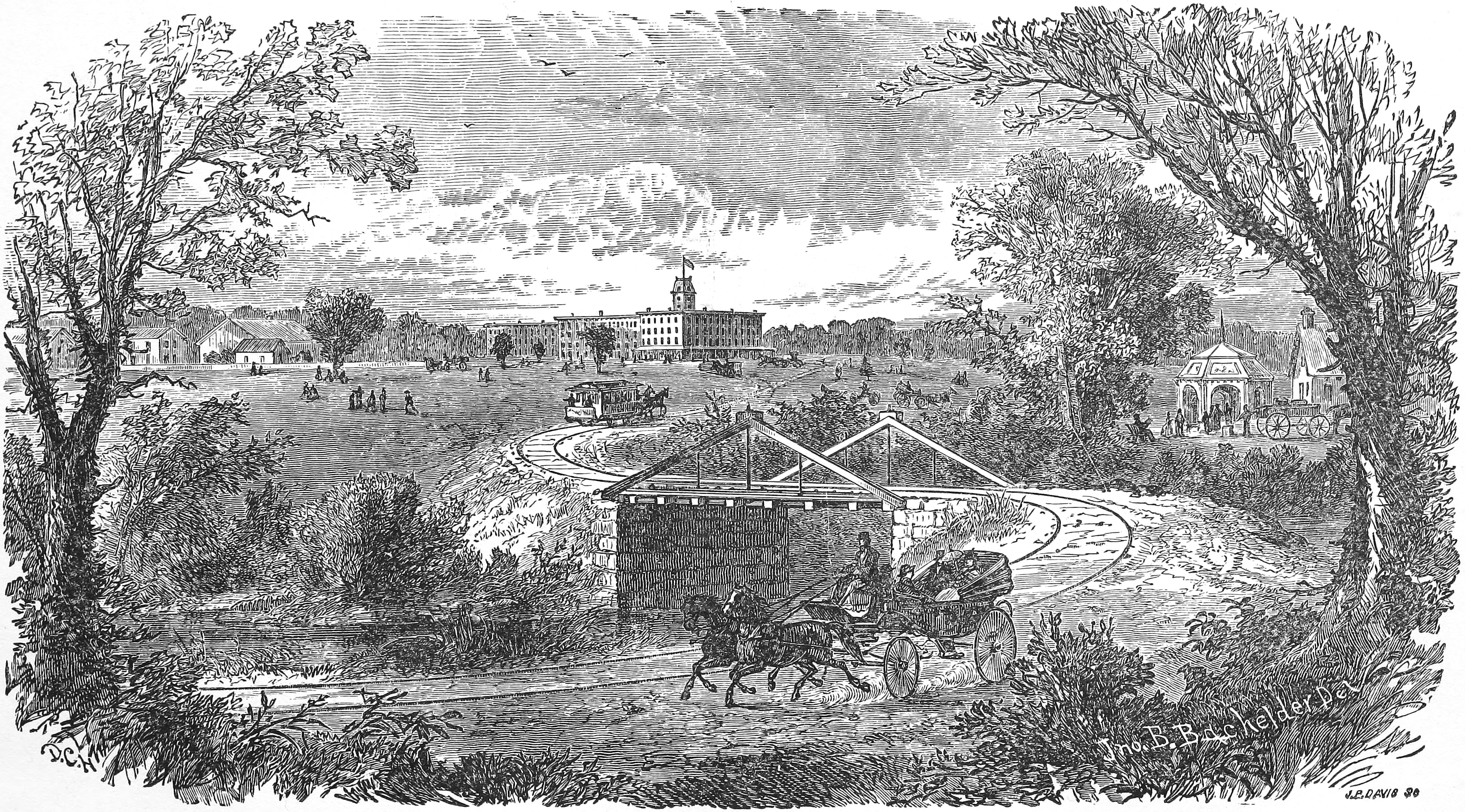
The Horse Railroad (foreground) extended to the Springs Hotel (background) crossing Willoughby Run near the Katalysine Springs (right).

The Gettysburg Spring Railroad (Springs Horse Railway) was a Gettysburg Battlefield tourist conveyance in the Battle of Gettysburg, First Day, area. The trolley extended from the western terminus on the east side of Herr Ridge at the Gettysburg Springs Hotel eastward to the Gettysburg borough after crossing Willoughby Run, McPherson Ridge, Pitzer Run, Seminary Ridge, Stevens Run (stone bridge), to the slopes of Baltimore Hill where it turned northward at the borough square to end at the Gettysburg Railroad Station. In addition to a stop at the Lutheran Theological Seminary at Gettysburg, by 1879 the horse railroad had a stop near Pitzer Run at the "Trotting Park" which was replaced after 1904 with a horse track east of Stevens Run at the county fairgrounds (now the Gettysburg Recreation Park).

== History ==
By October 9, 1867, "the Gettysburg Katalysine Spring Company had purchased...land from Willoughby run to Gettysburg, lying between the Hagerstown and Chambersburg roads ... to lay down a Horse Railway", and the Gettysburg Spring Railroad was organized by October 20, 1868. Construction had commenced by October 16 at the west end, with the first car running on June 25, 1869. (the hotel opened on June 28).

By December 24, 1904, the receivers of the Gettysburg Springs & Hotel Co transferred "four certain parcels of land aggregating" 36.56 acres (14.80 ha) east of the hotel to the United States Department of War which allowed the railbed/wagon road on McPherson Ridge's west slope to be telfordized as the commemorative era Meredith Avenue (the Pitzer Run section of the railroad no longer has Springs Av).

Stones of the railway's Willoughby Run bridge were still visible in the stream in 1991.
