= Camp Harding =

1922 US Marine Corps temporary encampment in Pennsylvania

Camp Harding was a 1922 United States Marine Corps temporary encampment on the Gettysburg Battlefield for the Marine Expeditionary Force which conducted maneuvers and a reenactment of Pickett's Charge for President Harding on July 1, and again for a crowd of more than 30,000 visitors on July 3. The camp was on the east slope of Seminary Ridge and used the area between the Emmitsburg Road and West Confederate Avenue (a large open air theater was at the Virginia Monument). A modern battle was staged on the Gettysburg battlefield on July 4 for 50,000 people.

== Simulated battle ==
At 10:30 a.m. on July 4, 1922, Camp Harding Marines from the 5th and 6th regiments of the U.S. Marine Fourth Brigade conducted a simulated battle that was "in many respects a simulation of battles fought in the Great World War rather than a reproduction of Pickett's charge", carried out "as the Marines would make it today" with two tanks (one with machine gun, the other with 1 pound rifle) advancing on a machine gun nest, four airplanes, and a hydrogen balloon which was shot with an incendiary round (the observer dropped from the basket using a parachute). An artillery duel was also conducted. The advance…stopped at the roadway…At 11:20…assembly call was sounded by the bugler … staged on last Saturday for the President… Medal of Honor ribbon, Capt Robert C. Carter…in the defense of the [Cemetery] Ridge…Marines camped on the side of Seminary Ridge.
