= MVPA =

MVPA may refer to:

- Military Vehicle Preservation Association
- The Music Video Production Association, an organization that protected industry professionals and ran the MVPA Awards from 1992 to 2020.
- Multivoxel pattern analysis, a statistical technique used in the analysis of fMRI images
- Moderate to Vigorous Physical Activity, a standard measure of physical activity
- Muvattupuzha, a major town in Kerala, India.
