= Pine Grove Furnace Prisoner of War Interrogation Camp =

Prisoner of war interrogation camp

Pine Grove Furnace POW Interrogation Camp
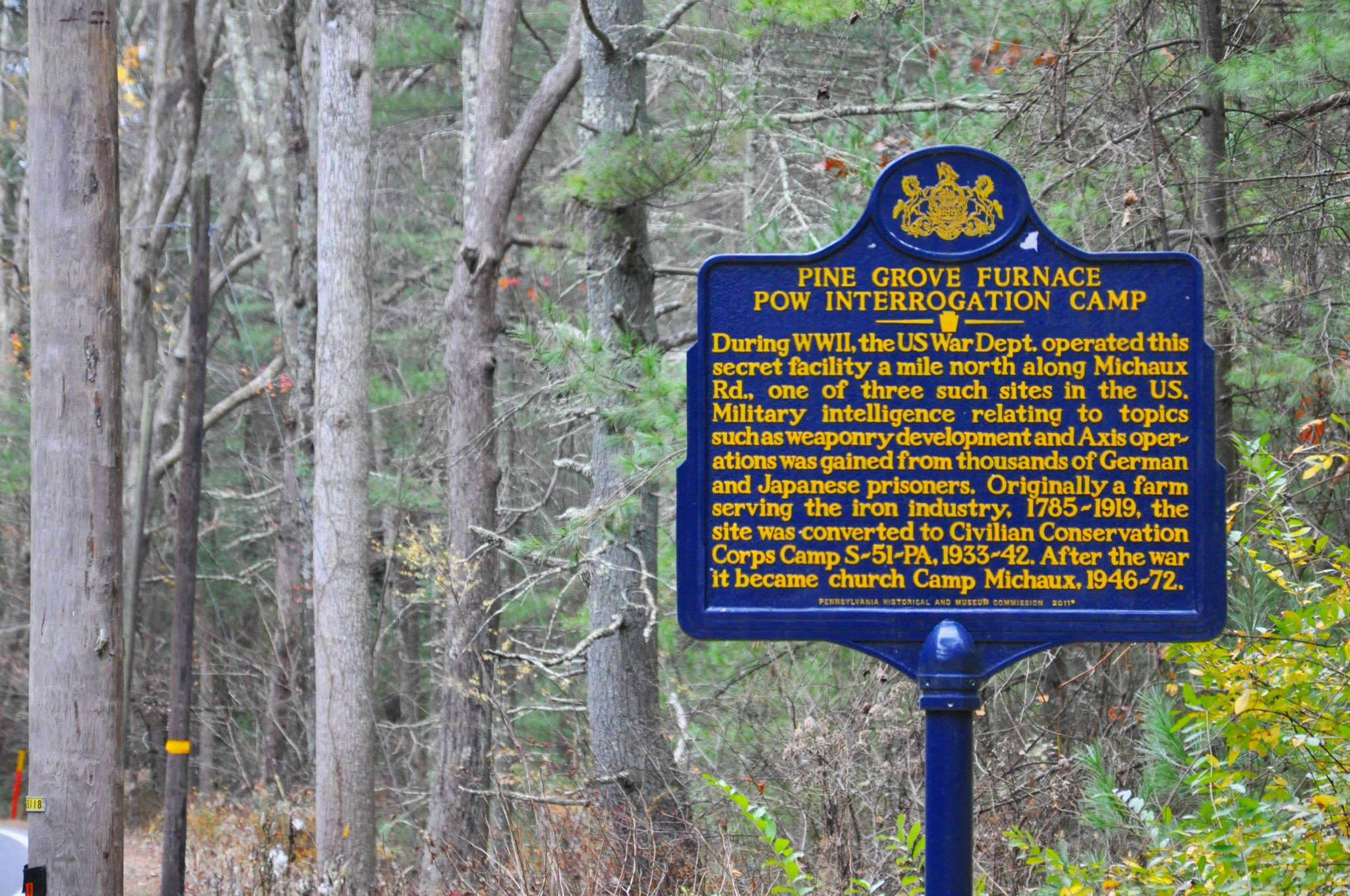
- Secret WWII Enemy Prisoner of War Camp in the United States
- Camp location in south-central Pennsylvania
- Type: World War II Prisoner of War Interrogation Camp
- Location: Cumberland County, Pennsylvania
- Coordinates: 40.0375°N 77.3388°W
- Area: 120 acres (49 ha)
- Built: 1943 by the United States Army Corps of Engineers
- Architect: William S. Lozier, Inc.
- Owner: United States War Department

The Pine Grove Furnace Prisoner of War Interrogation Camp was a secret World War II camp for interrogating German prisoners of war (POWs) located in a remote region in southern Pennsylvania, selected partly because of its proximity to Washington, DC. It operated from 1943 to 1945. Some ruins of the facility remain today.

The same site later became known as Camp Michaux after it was re-purposed as a church youth camp by the United Presbyterian Church jointly with the Evangelical and Reformed Church.

== Location ==
The camp is located in Cumberland County, Pennsylvania, near South Mountain, within the Michaux State Forest. The camp is along High Mountain Road, which was subsequently renamed Michaux Road. As a POW camp, the area of the site was approximately 120 acres (49 ha).

The Pine Grove Furnace POW Interrogation Camp was a short distance from Camp Sharpe, which served as a POW labor camp during World War II.

== Early history ==
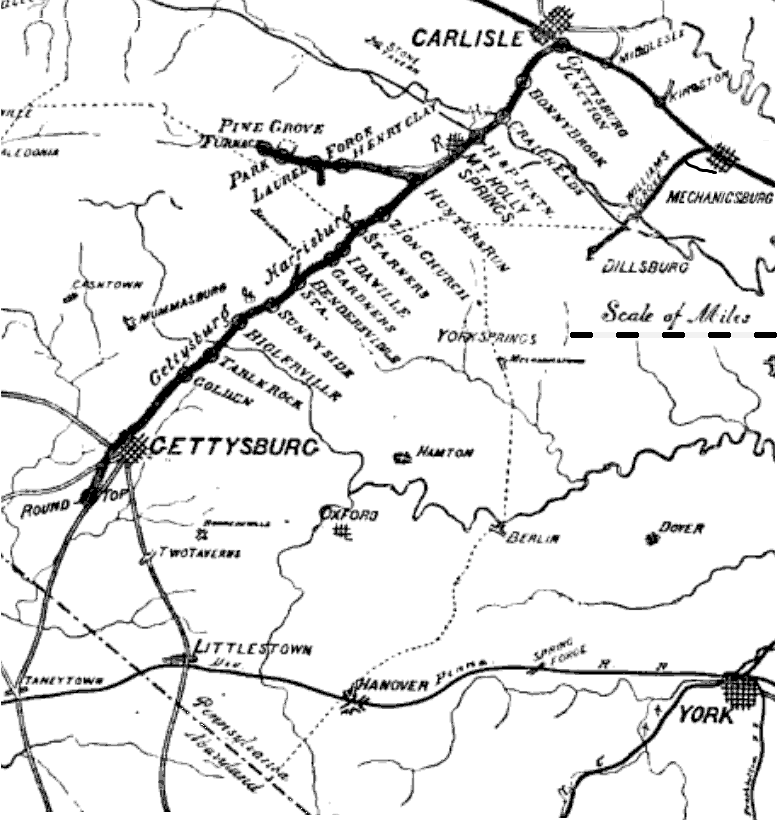
1885 Map of the Gettysburg and Harrisburg Railroad showing Pine Grove Furnace relative to Gettysburg, Pennsylvania, and Carlisle, Pennsylvania

The site that became the Pine Grove Furnace POW Interrogation Camp served a variety of purposes prior to becoming a POW camp. It was initially settled as farmland, known as the Bunker Hill Farm, which was approximately 250 acres (100 ha) in size.

In the 18th century, iron ore was discovered in the region. With abundant forest, the region also had an ample supply of charcoal. The availability of these resources gave rise to the local iron industry, especially by the Pine Grove Iron Works. (Note: The Pine Grove Iron Works was later part of the South Mountain Iron Company.) At its peak, the company's operations encompassed approximately 60 square miles (160 km^{2}) in the region.

By the latter part of the 19th century, the iron industry was in significant decline. This resulted in the sale of the property belonging to the South Mountain Iron Company to the Commonwealth of Pennsylvania in 1912. The Gardner farm also opened on this property following the closure of the iron works. The Commonwealth of Pennsylvania turned much of this property and surrounding regions into a state forest reserve.

=== CCC Camp ===
On May 22, 1933, the United States Government officially opened the Pine Grove Furnace Civilian Conservation Corps Camp, which it designated as Camp S-51-PA. Like other camps of the Civilian Conservation Corps (CCC), S-51-PA was administered under the auspices of the United States Army. S-51-PA was part of Company 329 of the CCC. The men of S-51-PA engaged in construction, forest management, and fire protection. They also had educational opportunities at the camp. The camp served approximately 200 men at any given time. The camp was 103 acres (42 ha) in area, (Note: The acreage that changed ownership over the course of the camp's history varied, depending on the purpose of the transaction.) although the workers at S-51-PA serviced a much larger area. As the involvement of the United States in World War II was becoming significant, the need for CCC diminished and Camp S-51-PA closed in February 1942.

== POW interrogation camp ==
The need for prisoner of war camps in the United States increased as World War II progressed. In particular, United States military officials believed that some of the prisoners were in possession of information of strategic value to the war effort. Officials in the intelligence organizations of the United States War Department perceived that the remoteness of facilities at Pine Grove Furnace provided security advantages while retaining the advantage of proximity to decision-makers in Washington, DC.

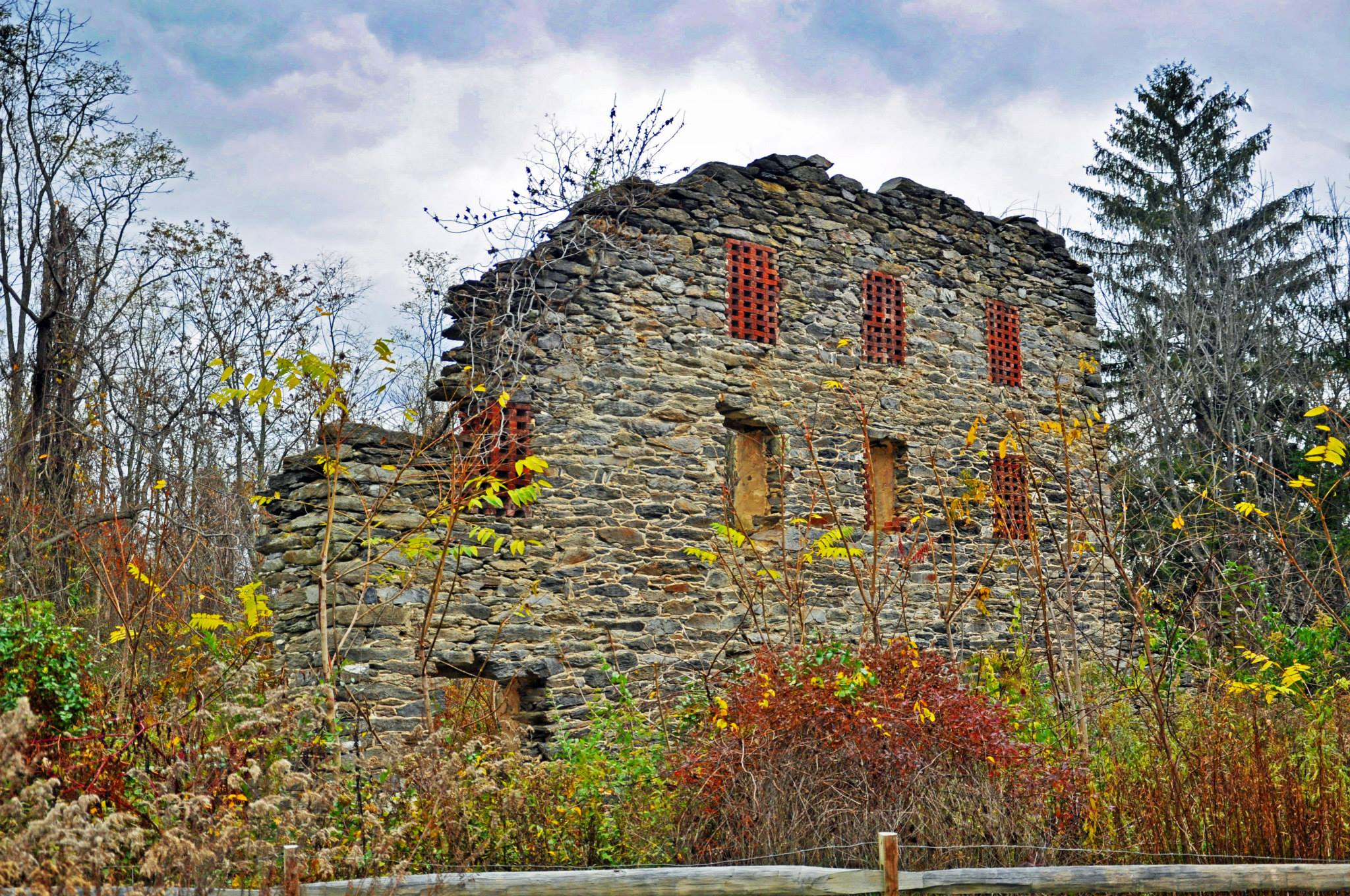
Farm house ruin adjacent to the POW camp where horses were stabled in case of POW escape

The War Department acquired the former CCC camp in December 1942. Construction work to convert the facility into a POW interrogation camp began on February 22, 1943, with construction carried out by the United States Army Corps of Engineers, using a design from the architectural firm William S. Lozier, Inc.

Pine Grove Furnace Prisoner of War Interrogation Camp supplemented previously established interrogation facilities at Fort Hunt in Virginia and at Camp Tracy in California.

The camp was constructed with a compound to house prisoners of war who were German military officers, with a second compound for enlisted soldiers. Later a third compound was built to house Japanese prisoners of war.

The Pine Grove Furnace POW Interrogation Camp became operational on May 20, 1943. Because of security considerations, the camp was referred to in unclassified documents as the "3300th Service Unit", with a mailing address of "Armed Service Forces, Third Service Command, P.O. Box 167, Carlisle, Pennsylvania". Military Police Officer Captain John F. Houck was the first commander of the camp, serving until Fall 1944. Then the camp commander was Captain Lawrence C. Thomas, who also commanded the World War II Prisoner of War Camp, Gettysburg Battlefield, Pennsylvania. Thomas was also selected because of his fluency in the German language.

The guards at Pine Grove Furnace POW Interrogation Camp were usually soldiers who had been wounded in combat but continued their duty by serving as POW prison guards.

The Pine Grove Furnace POW Interrogation Camp served as a facility for initial interrogation of prisoners of war as they were transported to the United States. At the camp, their value as intelligence sources was assessed by camp staff, and then the prisoners were then transported to other facilities according to their value. As such, most prisoners stayed at the Pine Grove Furnace POW Interrogation Camp for a time period of days to weeks. This simplified security considerations at the camp, and the camp had no reported escapes.

Because of the use of the camp to identify prisoners of war with significant value as intelligence sources and sort them from other prisoners of war, the Pine Grove Furnace POW Interrogation Camp is reported to be unique among the many WWII POW camps in the United States. The camp was neither a holding facility nor a detailed interrogation facility, unlike other POW camps.

Initially, the prisoners at the Pine Grove Furnace POW Interrogation Camp were from the German Afrika Korps and from the German U-Boat corps. The prison population expanded during its service and eventually included a small number of Japanese Prisoners of War.

Treatment of the prisoners of war at the Pine Grove Furnace POW Interrogation Camp was reported to be consistent with the mandates of the 1929 Geneva Convention. Prisoners had suitable personal space, diet, and recreation opportunities.

During their time at the Pine Grove Furnace POW Interrogation Camp, prisoners carried out various tasks consistent with the camp's security concerns. Their tasks extended to various artworks, and several of the prisoners artworks remain on display by the Cumberland County Historical Society. At least one of the prisoners, Heinrich Backhaus, became a professional artist.

The camp officially closed as a prisoner of war facility on 28 November 1948. At that time, the camp was returned to the Commonwealth of Pennsylvania, as part of the Michaux State Forest. Approximately 7500 German prisoners of war passed through the Pine Grove Furnace Prisoner of War Interrogation Camp and approximately 161 Japanese prisoners of war.

== Camp Michaux ==
External media
- Media links for the Pine Grove Furnace POW Interrogation Camp

Images
- Photographs of the ruins at the Pine Grove Furnace POW Interrogation Camp, from uncoveringpa.com

Video
- Exploring a Secret WWII Interrogation Camp, on Youtube

On July 1, 1947, the site that had been the Pine Grove Furnace POW Interrogation Camp was acquired jointly by the Mercersburg Synod of the Evangelical and Reformed Church and the Synod of Pennsylvania of the United Presbyterian Church, as a lease from the Commonwealth of Pennsylvania. They used the facility as a church youth camp, operating all year long. The lessees renamed the facility Camp Michaux, since it was part of the Michaux State Forest.

While the new operators made improvements to the camp, they used many of the same facilities built to house prisoners of war. The prisoners' artworks remained on display at Camp Michaux.

The cost of maintaining the aging camp became too much for the religiously-affiliated operators of Camp Michaux. The camp closed permanently on 31 Dec 1972, mostly for cost considerations. It is presently possible for visitors to tour the camp because of its historical significance and view various ruins. The Cumberland County Historical Society provides a guide to a self-guided walking tour of the grounds.

In 2020, Camp Michaux was the subject of an archeological evaluation, with few artifacts being found that relate to the facility's use as a POW interrogation camp.

== See also ==
- Pine Grove Furnace State Park
- Michaux State Forest
