= McMillan Woods CCC camp =

The McMillan Woods CCC camp was Civilian Conservation Corps camp NP-2 on the Gettysburg Battlefield planned in September 1933 near CCC Camp Renaissance in Pitzer Woods (camp NP-1). Captain Francis J. Moran moved from Camp Renaissance to become the new camp NP-2 commander in October 1933 (supervisors under Superintendent Farrell included Charles Heilman in 1936, and Major Renn Lawrence was the 1937 CCC sub-district commander.) The camp opened a new recreation hall in 1934 and provided manpower for building the veterans camp for the 1938 Gettysburg reunion, and about 50 enrollees of CCC Company #1355-C served as aides for unaccompanied veterans. During the reunion, Company F of the 34th Infantry used the CCC camp and had a headquarters office under Major C. Gilchrist (executive officer of the "regular army camp") and Capt. E. E. Wright. Captain Frederick L. Slade was the CCC commander on April 1, 1939.

In 1939, the McMillan Woods CCC camp became the 1st under an "all colored staff" when the white supervisory personnel transferred to the Blue Knob CCC camp (the camp's singing quartet made public appearances in 1939.) The camp worked on Jones Battalion avenue and constructed a new walkway on Big Round Top. The commander in 1940 was Captain Webb, and in March 1942, the McMillan Woods CCC camp was to be abandoned (the facility became the 1944-5 World War II POW camp at Gettysburg.)
