= Gettysburg Springs Hotel =

Hotel existed during American Civil War

Coordinates: 39.8351°N 77.2586°W

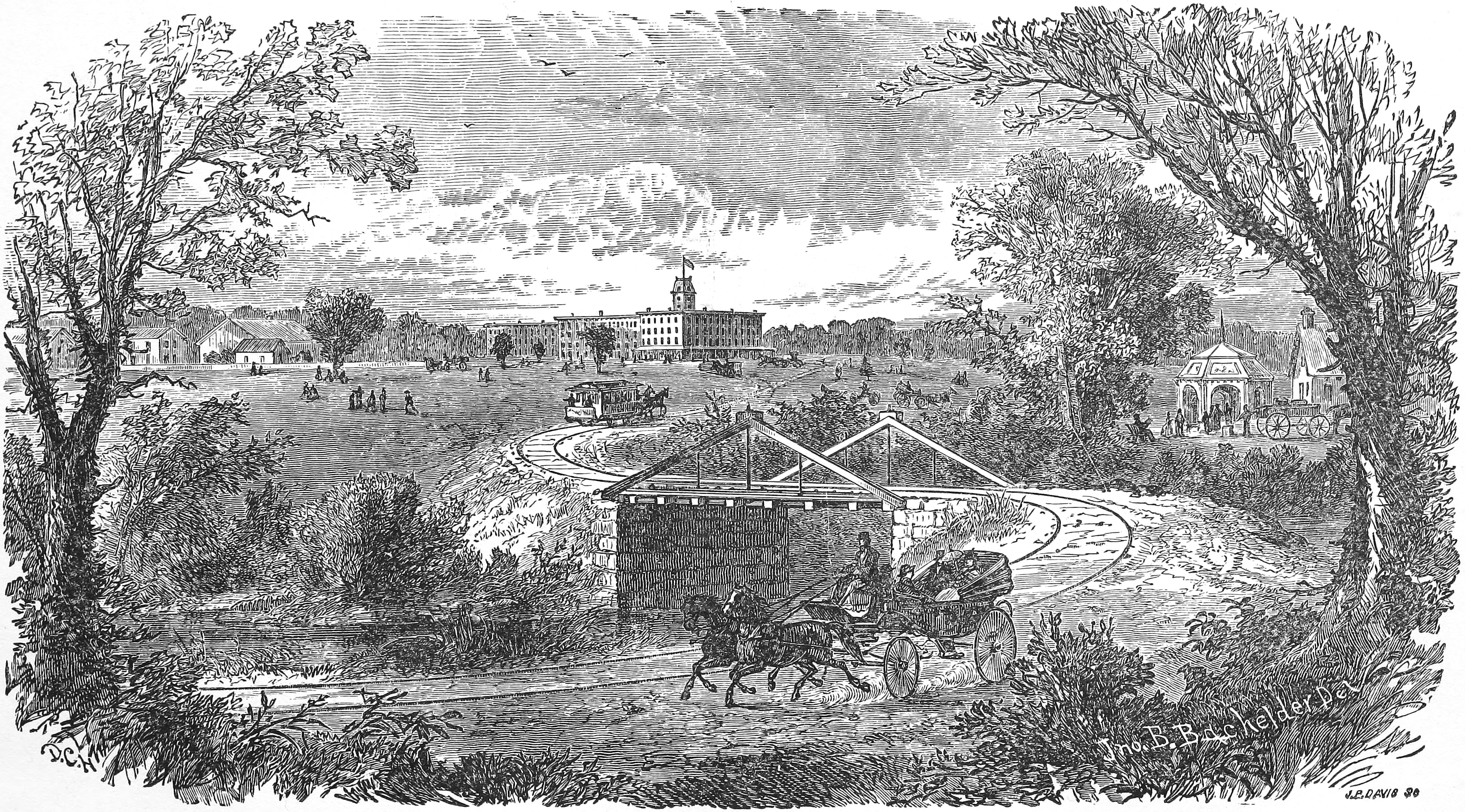
The Springs Hotel (background) at the end of the Gettysburg Spring Railroad (foreground) was near Willoughby Run and Katalysine Springs (right).

The Gettysburg Springs Hotel was a popular tourist site located on the Gettysburg Battlefield, near the area where the first day of combat took place during the American Civil War. The hotel was situated on the east side of Herr Ridge, at the western terminus of the Gettysburg Spring Railroad, and close to the Katalysine Springs.

== History ==
The hotel company was incorporated by the Commonwealth as the "Battle House and Mineral Springs Watering Place Company at Gettysburg" on April 12, 1867. Construction of the "Watering Place Hotel" began in 1868, and the hotel opened on June 28, 1869. A lease dispute in April 1869 between the proprietor and the New York and Gettysburg Spring Company resulted in a forcible entry at the bottling plant. However, the conflict was resolved in time for the hotel to host the first Gettysburg reunion. The hotel also hosted officers from the Battle of Gettysburg in 1882 for John B. Bachelder's survey of the battlefield.

The hotel company went bankrupt in 1901. On December 24, 1904, the receivers of the hotel transferred land east of the hotel to the United States Department of War. This transfer enabled the completion of the railbed and wagon road on the west slope of McPherson Ridge, utilizing construction methods pioneered by Thomas Telford. The area was subsequently developed into the commemorative era Meredith Avenue. Additional tracts of land from the Gettysburg Springs & Hotel property were transferred to the War Department in June 1907 and December 1913. The 1913 transfer included an area near the field of Pickett's Charge.

The hotel was destroyed by a December 1917 fire. The land that was privately owned became part of the Gettysburg Country Club golf course, until purchased by the National Park Service in 2011.

External image
- photograph in newspaper
