= James Walker (19th century painter) =

British-American painter (1819–1889)

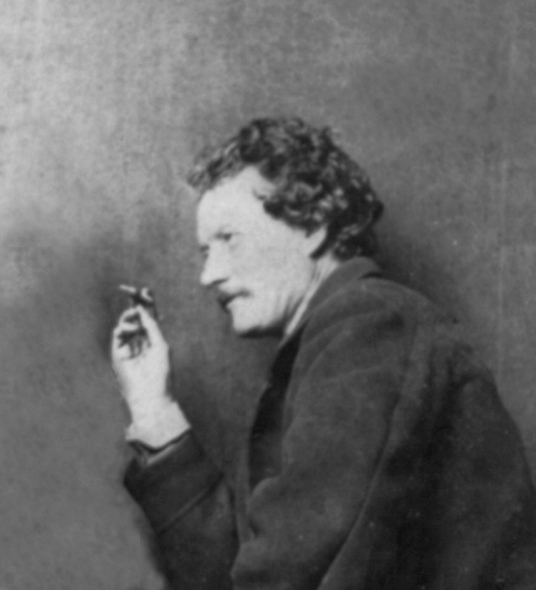
- Walker, circa 1864
- Born: James Walker; 1819; Northamptonshire, England
- Died: 1889 (aged 69–70); Watsonville, California, United States
- Known for: Painting

James Walker (1819–1889) was a British-American painter known for his panoramic paintings of battle scenes from the Mexican–American War and American Civil War. One of his most notable paintings is the 17.5 ft (5.3 m) wide The Battle of Chapultepec, displayed in the United States Capitol building in Washington, D.C., a battle which is memorialized in the first line of the U.S. Marine Corp's Hymn.

He is also known for a 20 ft (6.1 m) wide painting of the Battle of Gettysburg, based on John B. Bachelder's detailed map of the battlefield.

== Career ==
Born in Northamptonshire, England in 1819, Walker came to the United States as a boy around 1824, when his family settled near Albany, New York. He later lived in New York City.

In the mid-1840s, he was living in Mexico City, Mexico, where he was painting works based on colonial Mexican heritage. When the Mexican–American War broke out in 1846 he was forced into hiding for six weeks, and eventually made it behind American lines. He was subsequently engaged as an interpreter for General Winfield Scott's forces. He was present at the Battle of Chapultepec and the storming of Chapultepec Castle on the outskirts of Mexico City in September 1847. He made sketches of the battle, which he would use for later work.

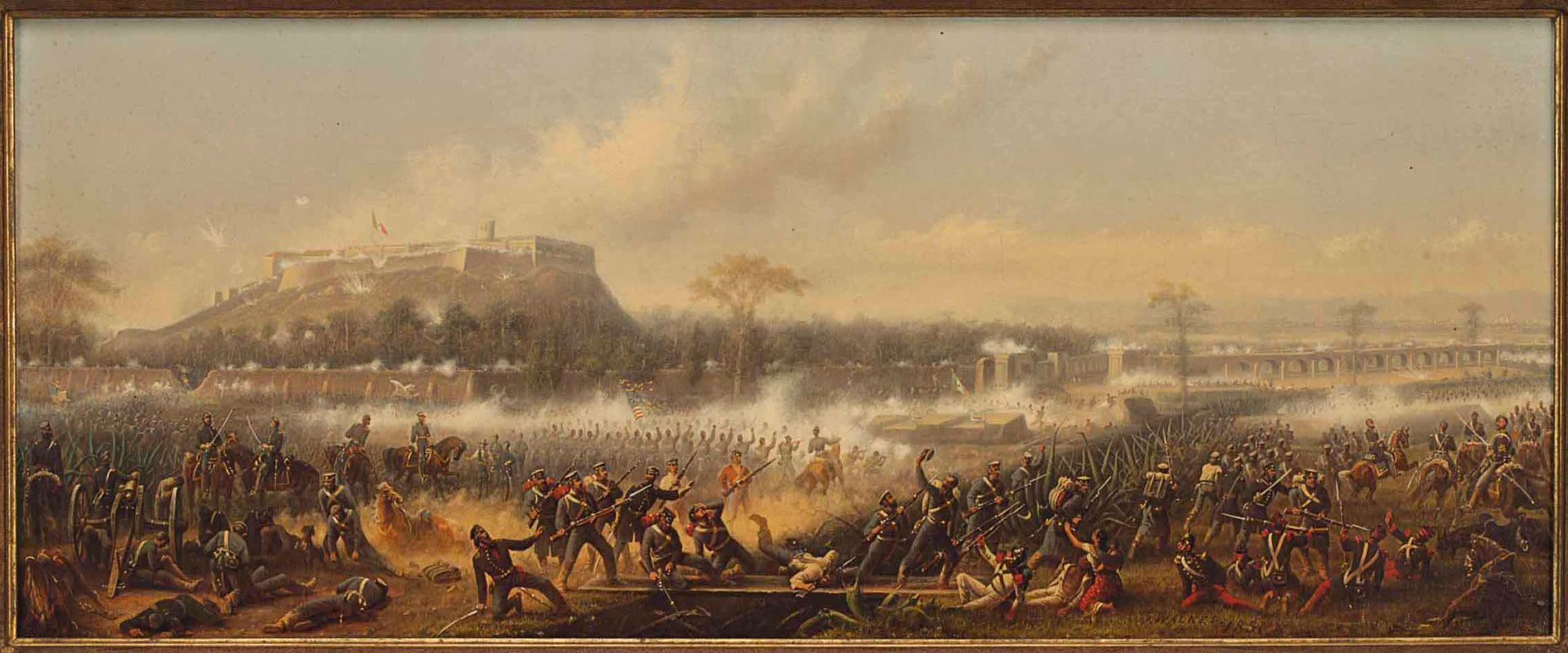
The Battle of Chapultepec (Storming of Chapultepec), by James Walker (1858)

In 1848 Walker returned to New York City where he established a studio, then subsequently again in Washington, DC, where he completed a series of Mexican-American War battle scenes. In 1857 he was commissioned by Captain Montgomery C. Meigs, who was supervising the construction of two new wings of the United States Capitol, to commemorate The Battle of Chapultepec. In 1862 the painting was delivered to the Capitol, a 17.5 ft (5.3 m) wide, 7.8 ft (2.4 m) tall work, entitled The Battle of Chapultepec (Storming of Chapultepec) for $6,137.37. The oil on canvas painting was eventually installed on the west staircase of the Senate wing of the building. The painting shows the consultation between General John Anthony Quitman, who led the charge, and the officers of his division of U.S. Marines prior to the attack. Their involvement is memorialized in the opening line of the Marine's Hymn ("From the Halls of Montezuma....").

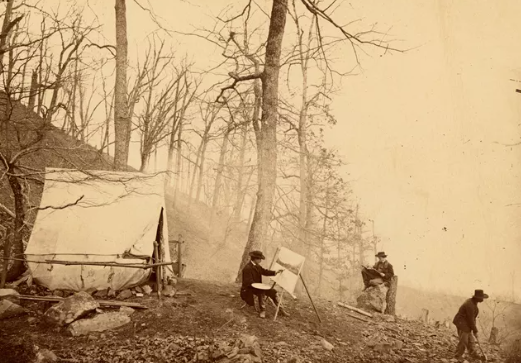
James Walker, seated at easel, at his camp on the slope of Lookout Mountain in 1863

During the Civil War, Walker spent significant time visiting and studying the terrain of battlefields, military maneuvers, and interviewing officers engaged in the fighting. He was known for his accuracy in portraying military scenes and detail, such as uniforms.

Walker's 1864 painting The Battle of Chickamauga depicts action on Snodgrass Hill in that battle on September 20, 1863. As part of the Army Art Collection, the painting was displayed in the U.S. Pentagon until September 1, 2001, just ten days before American Airlines Flight 77 was flown into the building during the September 11 attacks. From the Pentagon, the painting was moved to the office of Vice President Dick Cheney, who had a particular interest in it because it depicts action in which his great-grandfather Samuel Fletcher Cheney fought.

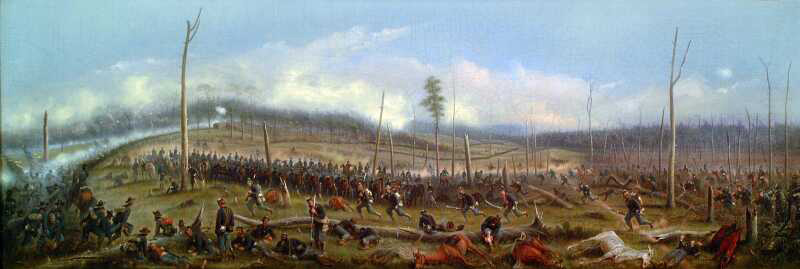
The Battle of Chickamauga (1864)

After the war Walker began to collaborate with John B. Bachelder, a photographer, topographer, and illustrator who had been attached to the Union army. Bachelder had spent years studying and interviewing participants of the 1863 Battle of Gettysburg and had created a detailed 3-D panoramic map/illustration of the battlefield, showing the position of every regiment and battery during the three day engagement. Walker teamed with Bachelder to create a massive 20 ft (6.1 m) wide, 7.5 ft (2.3 m) tall painting of the third day of battle, entitled The Battle of Gettysburg: Repulse of Longstreet's Assault, July 3, 1863. When the painting was completed and publicly displayed in 1870 it was praised by the public, journalists, and officers who had been there for its fidelity to the action and its detail. After its debut the painting went on a cross-country tour.

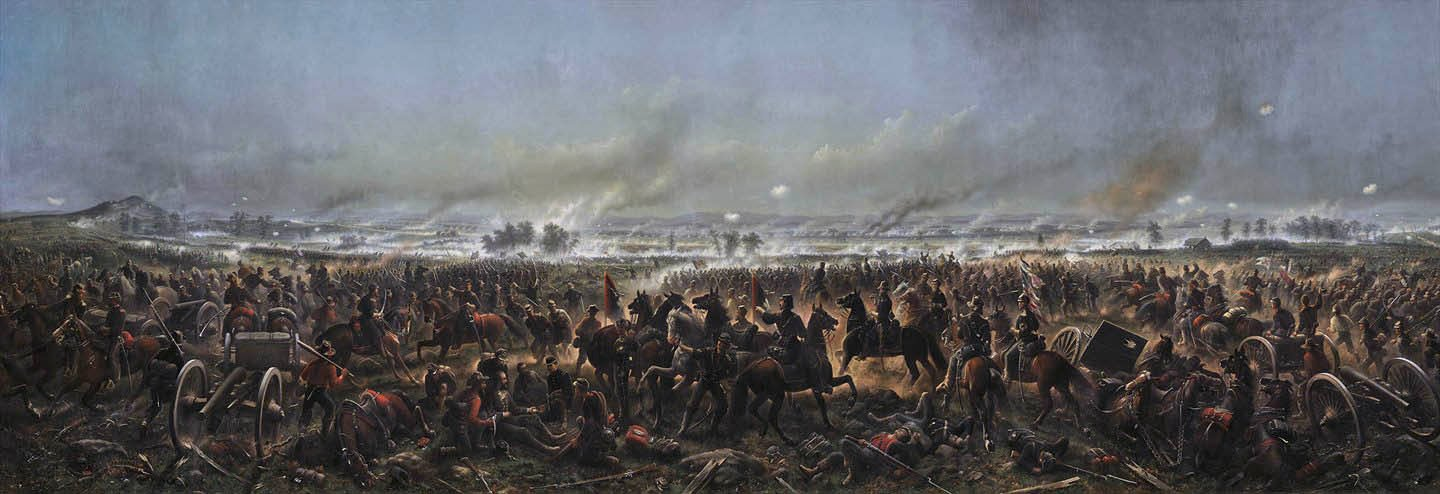
The Battle of Gettysburg: Repulse of Longstreet's Assault, July 3, 1863 (1870)

In 1870, General Joseph Hooker commissioned Walker to memorialize the Battle of Lookout Mountain, a Union victory in 1863 where Hooker had been in command, and during which Walker had spent time making sketches. It took Walker four years to complete the painting, a 30 ft (9.1 m) wide, 13 ft (4.0 m) tall work, Walker's largest, for which he was paid $20,000.

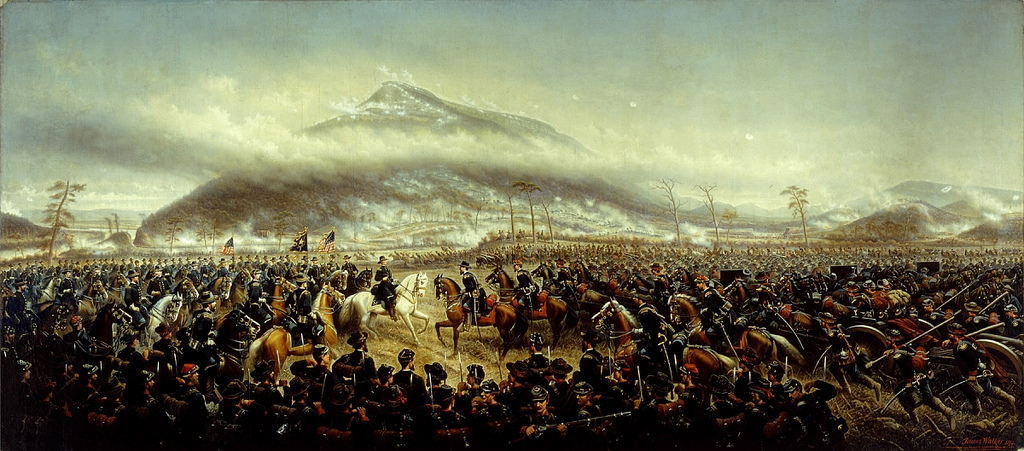
The Battle of Lookout Mountain (1874)

In the 1870s he moved to San Francisco and opened a studio. A Spanish-speaker, he concentrated on works portraying the Mexican influence on 19th century California.

Walker died in Watsonville, California in 1889.

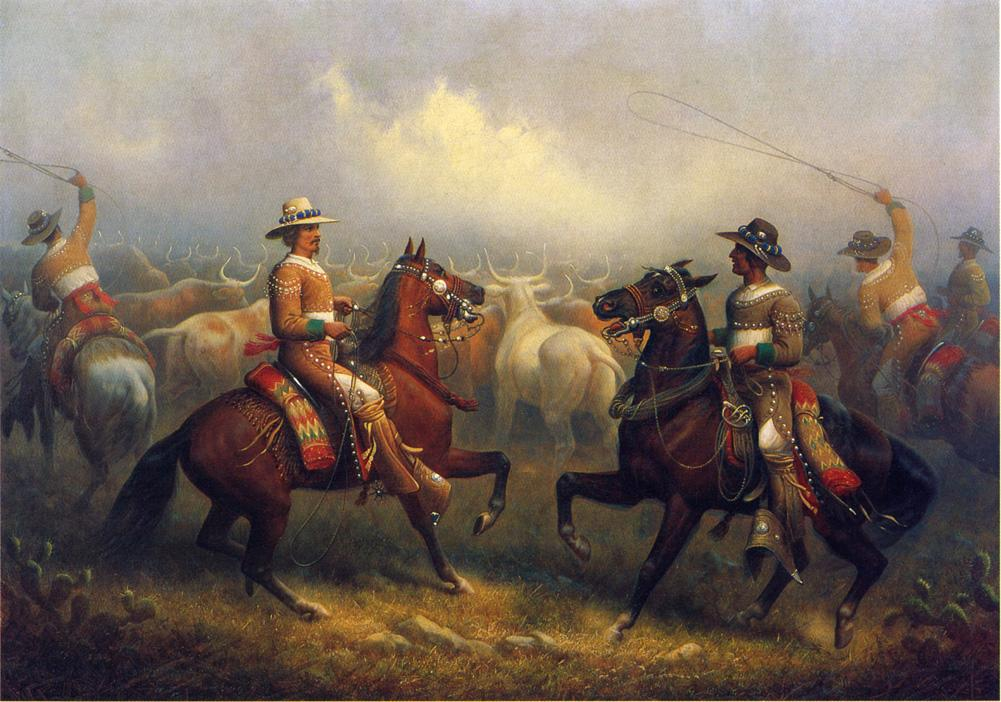
California Vaqueros (1875)

== Notable works ==
- The Battle of Chapultepec (Storming of Chapultepec) (1858)
- Review of Rhode Island and Maine Troops (1861)
- The Battle of Chickamauga (1864)
- The Battle of Gettysburg: Repulse of Longstreet's Assault, July 3, 1863 (1870)
- The Battle of Lookout Mountain (1874)
- California Vaqueros (1875)
