= East Cemetery Hill =

U.S. Civil War battle site in Gettysburg, Pennsylvania

Coordinates: 39.822°N 77.229°W

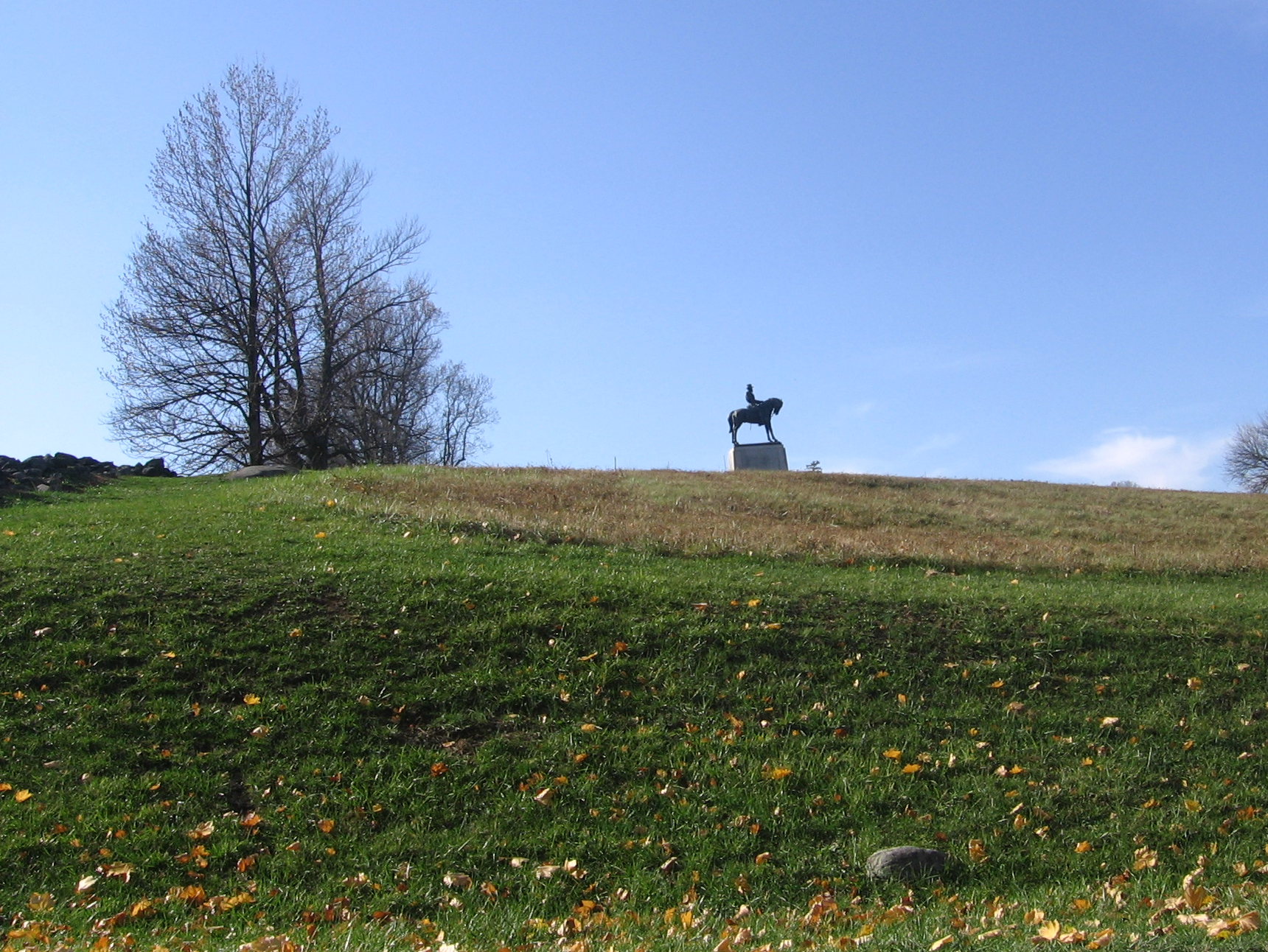
- slope of East Cemetery Hill equestrian statue of General Howard

Geography
- Location: Cumberland Township, Adams County, Pennsylvania, United States

East Cemetery Hill is a Gettysburg Battlefield landform used for the battle of East Cemetery Hill during the 1863 Battle of Gettysburg, Second Day. Located on the east of Gettysburg's Baltimore Street and the Baltimore Pike which meet on the hill, the hill is a northeast spur, and the east slope, of Cemetery Hill. The hill has numerous postwar battlefield monuments, as well as artillery lunettes remaining from the Battle of Gettysburg. Slocum Avenue is on the south slope, while Wainwright Avenue is near the east base.

== History ==
The 1785 survey for James Gettys established the borough line across the spur, and the 1807 Gettysburg and Petersburg Turnpike Company operated the toll road on the summit. Raffensberger Hill was renamed "East Cemetery Hill" in 1858 after Evergreen Cemetery was established on the south slope of Cemetery Hill in 1854. Following the battle, a July 6 Union military camp was established on East Cemetery Hill, and the 1886 Camp Hancock was a postbellum camp on East Cemetery Hill. The Gettysburg Battlefield Memorial Association acquired the Raffensberger land during the memorial association era and operated an 1878 wooden observation tower of 40 ft (12 m) East Cemetery Hill had been built near the monument for Battery B, Pennsylvania Light Artillery. East Cemetery Hill became part of the Gettysburg National Military Park in 1895 and in 1875, 10 acres (4.0 ha) on East Cemetery Hill were excavated for iron. The Gettysburg Water Company established a well on the hill's "Crosta Lot" in 1882, groundbreaking for the Gettysburg Cyclorama building for the 1913 Gettysburg reunion was in 1912, and the Howard equestrian statue was erected in 1932.
