= McMillan Woods =

- Interactive map of McMillan Woods

Geography
- Location: Adams County, Pennsylvania, United States

Ecology
- Fauna: Northern Piedmont ecoregion

McMillan Woods is a Gettysburg Battlefield forested area used during the Battle of Gettysburg and for camps after the American Civil War, including a CCC camp and the subsequent WWII POW camp at Gettysburg. The woods includes Rifle Pits and Earth Works from the battle.

The cast iron site identification tablet for the woods was placed in 1920, and the woods is the site of a youth campground.

== History ==
Chronology
Date	Event
1906-07-16	Camp Henderson of the PA National Guard used 95 acres (0.38 km^{2}) in McMillan Woods and the Trostle, Klingel, Sherfy, McPherson, and Codori farms for the encampment through July 16. Maneuvers were conducted from Zeigler's Grove to Devil's Den. (the joint maneuver camp followed at Mount Gretna's Camp Roosevelt.)
1934-02-03	CCC camp NP-2 had opened in McMillan Woods (Charles Heilman was the 1936 commander).
1942-03	The McMillan Woods CCC camp was to be abandoned after becoming the 1st under an "all colored staff" in 1939.
1944-11-15	POWs moved to the former McMillan Woods CCC camp converted to the Gettysburg WWII POW Camp to replace the stockade.
1949-08-09	The site of the former POW camp was used for the camporee of the Black Walnut Boy Scout district.
1966	Boy Scout summer camps formerly held at Pardee Field began at McMillan Woods.
1989	Improvements were completed at the McMillan Woods Youth Campground for hosting 5500 campers each year.
