= Transcontinental Motor Convoy =

US Army expeditions assessing American roads

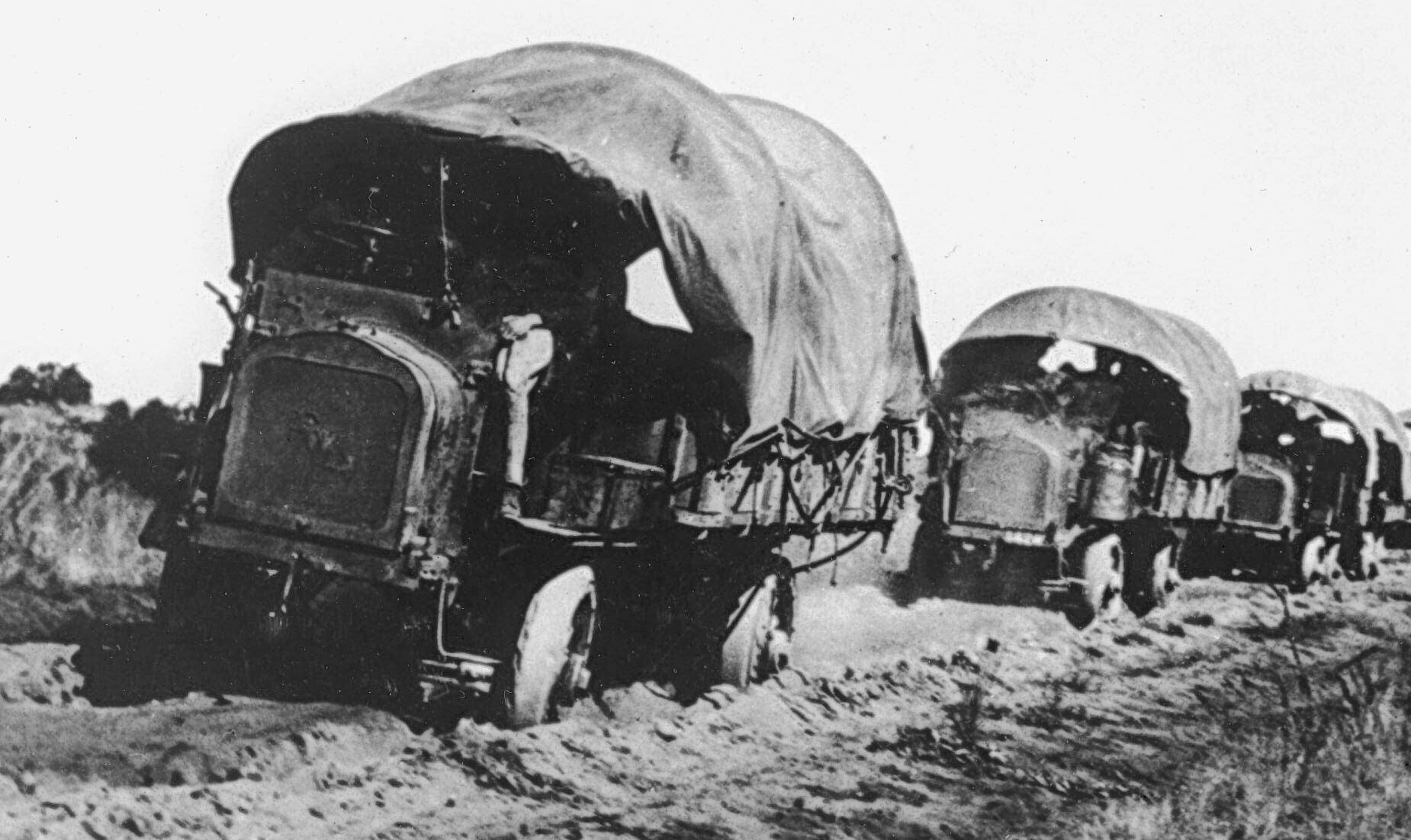
U.S. Army truck convoy in Mexico, 1916

The Transcontinental Motor Convoys were early 20th century vehicle convoys, including three US Army truck trains, that crossed the United States (one was coast-to-coast) to the west coast. The 1919 Motor Transport Corps convoy from Washington, D.C., to San Francisco used the incomplete Lincoln Highway.

== Background ==
The United States' Good Roads Movement of the late 19th century began as increased use of bicycles required better surfaces over the existing wagon and carriage roads. The development of the automobile and their increased use resulted in the formation of the United States Good Roads Association and various individual cross-country trips by individual vehicles, followed by the first transcontinental trip by a convoy of vehicles.

U.S. events leading up to 1919 and 1920 convoys
Date	Event
1907	First US Army truck purchase
1911	Boy Scouts create the Automobiling merit badge
1912	Packard truck carries 3 tons from New York to San Francisco
1912	National Highways Association incorporated
1912	First official U.S. Army truck test from Washington DC to Fort Benjamin Harrison
7-28-1913	US Army Alaska expedition used a White Motor truck.
11-1914	U.S. Army reports 1½ ton trucks superior to 2½ ton trucks
8-25-1915	Transcontinental motor convoy by film crew
7-11-1916	1st Federal highway funding legislation (five year plan)
7-4-1917	Flagpole memorial placed at west Lincoln Highway terminus
12-1917	U.S. Army convoy from Detroit to an "Atlantic Coast port"
6-2-1918	U.S. Army School for Truck Drivers "just opened"
c. 1918	Chicago-to-New York City convoy sets Army distance record
11-11-1918	Germans sign Armistice (cease fire) agreement, ending WWI
12-1-1918	During World War I 90,727 trucks produced for the Army and Navy
3-27-1919	Ship-by-Truck Association formed

== 1915 transcontinental film convoy ==
The 1915 transcontinental film convoy was a four-month motor convoy beginning August 25 and ending at the Panama–Pacific International Exposition in San Francisco. The film crew completed the "Three-Mile Picture Show" (named for the length of film). The film was directed by Henry Ostermann, Consul at Large for the Lincoln Highway Association, who travelled in a Stutz touring car.

The last known existing copy of "The Three Mile-Picture Show" was in the film storage vaults of The University of Michigan, having been donated to the university by Henry Ostermann, and his associate, Gael Hoag. In 1957 the university was contacted by Walt Disney Productions, who wanted to use a part of the film in their movie "The American Highway". When the University Of Michigan inspected the film for the first time since the 1920s, they found it very deteriorated, and very flammable. They shipped the dangerous film to Disney, who only wanted a few "humorous" moments to use in their movie, "The American Highway" (1958). After discussion between The University Of Michigan and film restorers, this copy of "The Three-Mile Picture Show" was then said to have been destroyed.

== 1919 Motor Transport Corps convoy ==
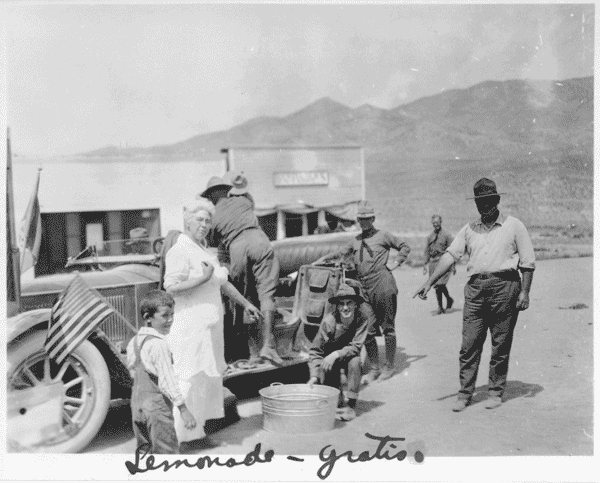
1919 Motor Transport Corps convoy car at a service station in a western desert town

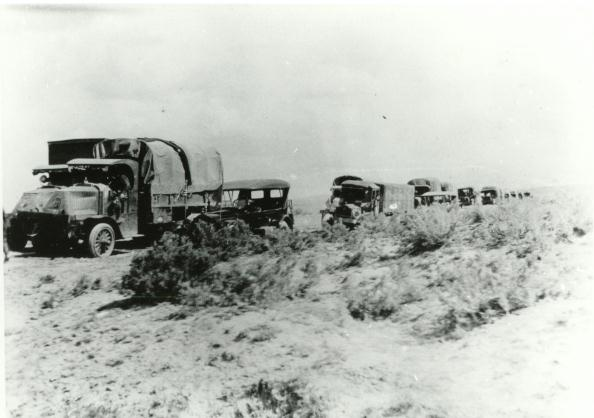
1919 "Trans-Continental Motor Truck Trip"

The 1919 Motor Transport Corps convoy was a "Truck Train" of the US Army Motor Transport Corps that drove over 3,000 mi (4,800 km) from Washington, D.C. (departing July 7 and arriving September 6), to Oakland, California, and ferried to San Francisco. In addition to 230 road incidents (stops for adjustments, extrications, breakdowns, & accidents) resulting in 9 vehicles retiring, the convoy of "24 expeditionary officers, 15 War Department staff observation officers (e.g., Bvt Lt Col Dwight D. Eisenhower of the Tank Corps), and 258 enlisted men" had 21 injured en route who did not complete the trip. (Note: Contemporary sources differ on the number of official observers. Lt. Jackson's official report lists 17 observers by name while the "Principal Facts" monograph states there were 15 observers without naming them.) Although some "were really competent drivers" by the end, the majority of soldiers were "raw recruits with little or no military training"; and except for the Motor Supply Company E commander (1st Lt Daniel H. Martin), troop officers had "meager knowledge" of "handling men in the field". (Note: List of control points with dates and mileages, p. 5: List of officers, p. 8: List of vehicles & trailers, p. 31: Appendices, pp. 60–80: Daily Log) (Note: also published in Mechanical Eng., vol. 42, no. 3, March 1910, pp. 145–150 and 205, 16 figs. Note: The p. 2 Frederick, Md listings indicate the table uses the inaccurate title "Scheduled Arrivals" for the locations/dates of Scheduled Departures' (cf. East Palestine listings after the Sewickley delay). Similarly, p. 4 inaccurately indicates the last 3 scheduled listings (i.e., Jackson's retyped schedule has scheduled departures from Stockton 8/29/19 and 8/30/19, which inaccurately means a different—but unidentified—scheduled destination for the evening of 8/30 was required before the scheduled 8/31/19 rest day and subsequent arrival in San Francisco.)

The route taken by the convoy began at the Zero Milestone in Washington, D.C. The convoy proceeded to Gettysburg, where it met up with the Lincoln Highway. They then followed the Lincoln Highway all the way to San Francisco.

The convoy broke and repaired 88 wooden bridges (Note: Page 5 identifies this typescript was written after the permanent "granite and bronze milestone" (authorized 1920, dedicated 1923) had been placed; and repeated use of "Air Corps" further indicates it was written after the 1918 Air Service became the 1926 Air Corps.) (14 in Wyoming), and "practically" all roadways were unpaved from Illinois through Nevada. The convoy logged 3,250 miles (5,230 km) in 573.5 hours (5.67 mph avg.). and 6 rest days without convoy travel were used. Convoy delays required extra encampments and, at Oakland, California, the convoy was 7 days behind schedule, ferrying the next morning on the last travel day.

== 1919 Air Service Transcontinental Recruiting Convoy ==
The 1919 Air Service Transcontinental Recruiting Convoy was a "mobile army post" of over 1/2 mile length to support 13 aircraft from Hazelhurst Field to California beginning August 14, 1919. The mission of the All American Pathfinders was "to secure accurate information to be used in connection with the carrying of mails by airplanes, and for military purposes, as well as commercial purposes."

== 1920 Motor Transport Corps convoy ==
The 1920 Motor Transport Corps convoy left Washington, D.C., on 14 June 1920 and followed the Bankhead Highway to San Diego, California, where it arrived on 2 October. A smaller expedition than the first, the second convoy consisted of 50 vehicles, 32 officers, and 160 enlisted men under Col John F. Franklin. A rate of 45–60 miles per day was initially estimated, commensurate with that of the first convoy.

The convoy's trip proceeded smoothly as far as Atlanta, but, as it moved west into Tennessee, its progress slowed. Detours became necessary due to flooding and the crossing of the "black gumbo" of the Mississippi River proved very problematic. Despite high hopes, the Southern United States proved to be the worst part of the trip. The convoy encountered almost impassable sands between Maricopa and Wellton, Arizona.

Like the first convoy, at every stop the expedition was met by local celebrations and dances. After 111 days and an average rate of less than 30 miles per day, the convoy reached the West Coast where an officer's banquet was given in San Diego. After its arrival in San Diego, the convoy then went north to Los Angeles and was broken up, its equipment distributed to California's public services as part of a program to make use of war surplus.

The officers of the expedition became convinced by their experience that the maintenance of a national highway system should be the province of the federal government, as supported by the Townsend Bill.

== Aftermath ==
Despite the widespread friendly greetings received by the convoys across the nation, neither generated enough public support to ensure passage of the Townsend Bill, which failed and was replaced by the Federal Highway Act of 1921. Both the 1919 and 1920 convoys are identified on the Zero Milestone on the Ellipse in Washington, D.C.

== 2009 commemoration of 1919 convoy ==
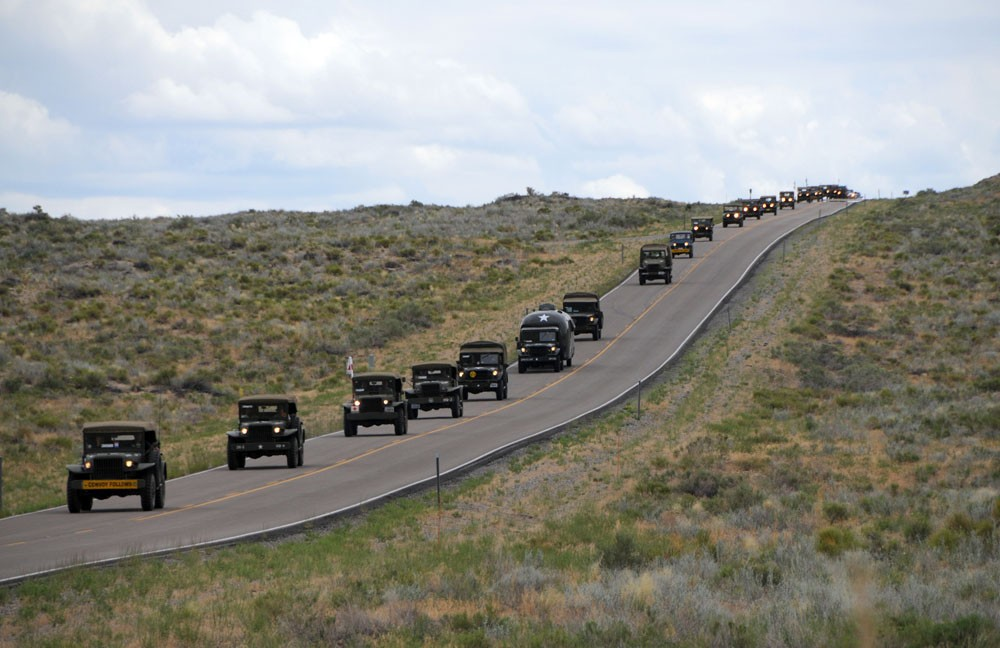
The 2009 Convoy traveling down the Lincoln Highway.

In the summer of 2009, on the 90th anniversary of the original trek, the Military Vehicle Preservation Association sponsored a re-enactment of the 1919 convoy. Beginning June 10, following the original route as much as possible and duplicating the original schedule, the convoy set out from Washington, D.C. Over the length of the convoy, more than 150 historic military vehicles, including fifty military jeeps, nineteen 3/4 ton trucks, seven 1½ ton trucks, six 2½ ton trucks, three cargo trucks, nine motorcycles, and four sedans took part. The oldest vehicle to take part was a 1917 Four Wheel Drive Model B 3 ton ammunition truck.

The reenactors had three purposes: along with retracing the route of 1919 convoy over the historic Lincoln Highway, they paid tribute to the U.S. military and commemorated the 200th anniversary of the birth of President Abraham Lincoln.

== 2019 commemoration of 1919 convoy ==
In August and September 2019, on the 100th anniversary of the original trek, two touring groups commemorated the centennial of the 1919 tour. First, the Military Vehicle Preservation Association sponsored a re-enactment of the 1919 convoy as they had done in 2009. The second tour was made by members of the Lincoln Highway Association. Both tours started in Washington, D.C., and ended in San Francisco.
