= Gettysburg Airport =

Airport in Pennsylvania, United States of America

Coordinates: 39°51′25″N 77°15′47″W

The Gettysburg Airport (Forney Airfield in World War II) was a Gettysburg Battlefield facility northwest of Gettysburg, Pennsylvania, on the west slope of Oak Ridge off of the Mummasburg Road.

== History ==
The Gettysburg Flying Service operated airplane tours of the battlefield from the west slope of Oak Ridge in the 1920s (cf. the Battlefield Airways at the Battlefield Airport across from The Peach Orchard), and the field was a 1939 site on the initial transcontinental airmail line. In 1937, TBD Bircher took over the Boulevard airport in southeast Pennsylvania ("William Penn airport" when opened in 1917, closed 1951), but his World War II flight training school was "forced to move from Philadelphia because of wartime restrictions on flying." Bircher bought the W. A. Kelly farm near Gettysburg, for the Gettysburg Flying Service and in 1942 the new airport was built along the Mummasburg Road (2 runways of 1/2 mile and 1900 feet) after being granted a Civilian Aeronautics Administration license. Lighting was added to the 1895 Oak Ridge Observation Tower, and the airport's World War II Civilian Pilot Training program included Temple University students from the battlefield's Lee-Meade Inn.

In January 1944, Bircher was the owner-operator of the Gettysburg School of Aeronautics and was notified to close the school circa July 1 (1944 appropriations were for a different airport.) In 1947, farm chicks survived an airplane crash at the airport but died in a subsequent hangar fire while in the 1950s, President Eisenhower used the airport to travel between The White House and his Gettysburg farm. In 1969 to compete against the Doersom Airport on the Lincoln Highway, the Mummasburg Road facility became the "Gettysburg Airport" of Sheen, Louser, & Roth; but was converted to a turf farm in 1981.
