= Gettysburg Armory =

- U.S. National Register of Historic Places
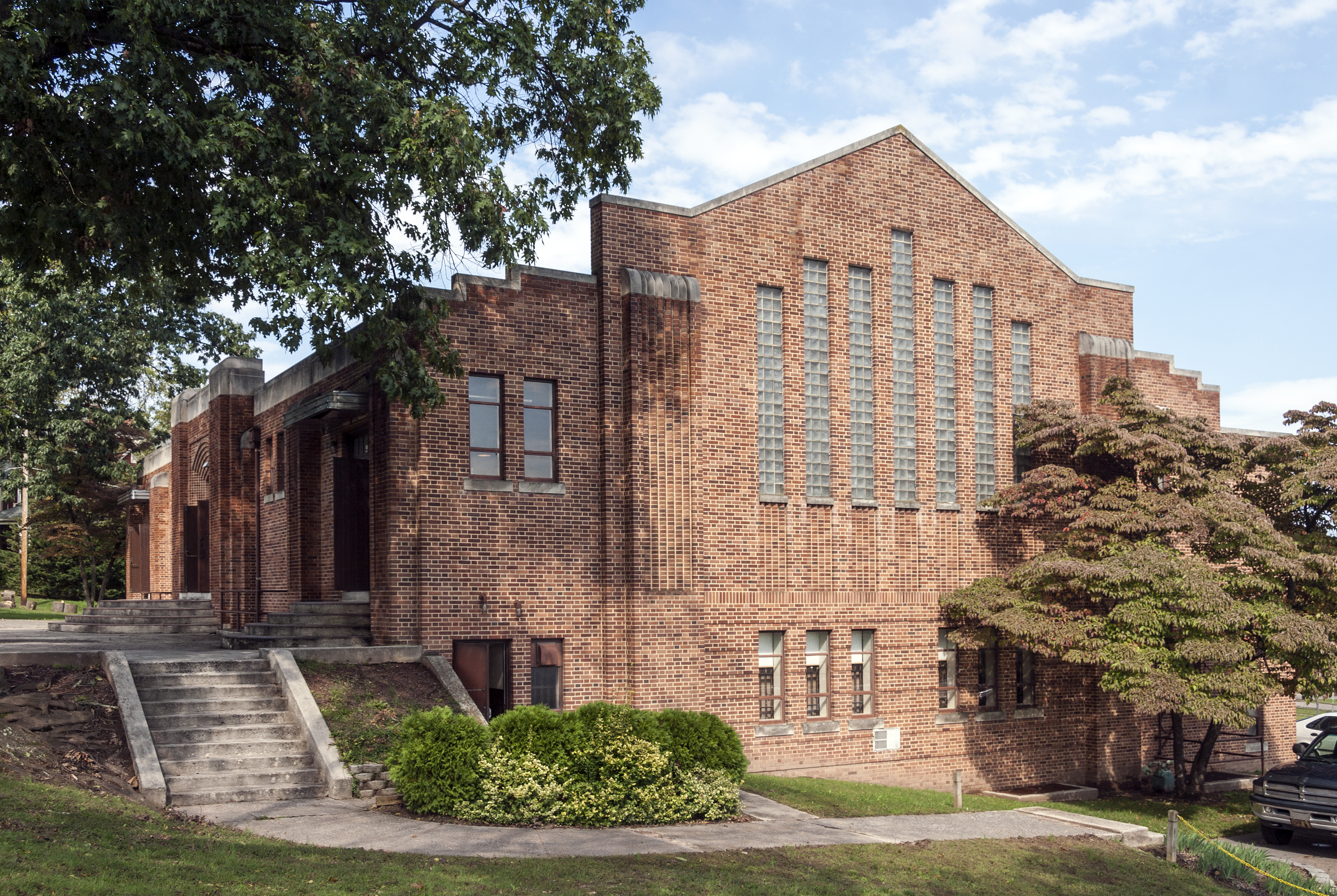
- Gettysburg Armory, 2012

- Location within Pennsylvania Location within the United States
- Location: 315 West Confederate Avenue, Seminary Ridge, Gettysburg, Pennsylvania
- Coordinates: 39°49′37″N 77°14′38″W
- Area: 3.9 acres (1.6 ha)
- Built: January 10-August 26, 1938
- Architect: John B. Hamme
- Architectural style: Art Deco
- MPS: PA National Guard Armories
- NRHP reference No.: 90000422
- Added to NRHP: April 18, 1990

The Gettysburg Armory is a former National Guard armory which is located in Gettysburg, Adams County, Pennsylvania, United States.

It was listed on the National Register of Historic Places in 1990.

== History and architectural features ==
The 61x96 ft (44 ft high) Art Deco facility was constructed as a $43,331 Works Projects Administration project for the local National Guard unit (commanded by Lt Ralph C. Deitrick in 1933).

The two-story building housed a garage and repair shop for military vehicles, a classroom, administrative space, and a drill hall.

From the beginning, the Armory was used not only by the National Guard, but also by the local community, for sporting events and community meetings. In 1944, the Gettysburg Armory was used as a temporary German Prisoner of War camp while the official camp was being constructed on the Gettysburg Battlefield. Later the building was designated as a public fallout shelter by the National Fallout Shelter Survey.

In 2010, the building was vacated by Battery B, 1/108th Field Artillery after a new readiness center was constructed in South Mountain. In 2013, the Armory was transferred to the private sector by the Pennsylvania General Assembly.
