= World War II Prisoner of War Camp, Gettysburg Battlefield, Pennsylvania =

The World War II Prisoner of War camp on the Gettysburg Battlefield was established on a former military engagement site of the American Civil War in Gettysburg, Pennsylvania in the United States.

This prison camp, which was created to house four hundred and fifty POWs who had previously been incarcerated at the Gettysburg Armory on Seminary Ridge and a stockade that was located on the Emmitsburg Road, operated from June 29, 1945, through April 1946 at the former site of the McMillan Woods CCC camp.

== History ==
The camp consolidated prisoners of war from the Gettysburg Armory on Seminary Ridge (100 POWs on September 16, 1944) and those from the 400 ft × 600 ft (120 m × 180 m) stockade on the Emmitsburg Road (350 prisoners) at the former World War I Camp Colt site. On January 22, 1945, the U.S. Employment Service began using Gettysburg POWs for pulpwood cutting, and in June the camp opened with 500 German POWs (932 by July), POW employment ended February 23, 1946; and by April 13, 1946, only guards remained at the POW Camp (guards had numbered as high as 50.) The last commander was Captain James W Copley, and before the camp was opened, Captain Lawrence Thomas had been the commander of both Gettysburg facilities and the Camp Michaux interrogation facility near Pine Grove Furnace State Park.
