= Camp Renaissance =

Camp Renaissance was Civilian Conservation Corps camp NP-2 that was established on March 10, 1933, in the Gettysburg Battlefield's Pitzer Woods for reforestation (all 45 tents were blown down by a July 2 "twister"). On September 22, 1933, Captain Moran transferred to Camp Renaissance to become the Company 1332 commander, (his 1934 Company 385 of 199 workers was named the best camp/unit in subdistrict 8). The camp with Company #385-C) in Pitzer Woods closed in April 1937 (Frank J. Slonaker, former president of the battlefield guide association, had been the camp's service officer).

The Pitzer Woods site was subsequently used for a July 5-9, 1941, encampment of the 71st Coast Artillery Regiment (Anti-Aircraft); for a July 28, 1941, 68th Coast Artillery (AA) day camp; and for the 1943-4 Camp Sharpe training installation.
