= Lee-Meade Inn =

The Lee-Meade Inn was a World War II army site on the Gettysburg Battlefield in the area of Hood's Assault. The facility was south of Rose Run on the "light grade" north of the South Confederate Avenue crest. The Inn had 37 ft (11 m) of frontage on the Emmitsburg Road, cabins in the rear, and an adjacent service station.

Constructed during the development era (by 1931) across from the Battlefield Airport site and subsequently operated by a 1937 corporation, Temple University leased the Inn for students of the 1942 Civilian Pilot Training program in the Gettysburg School of Aeronautics. From 1943-1945, the Army's War Mapping Unit used the Inn to produce maps for the invasion of Japan.
