= Battlefield Airport =

The Battlefield Airport was the Gettysburg Battlefield site of the Battlefield Airways, Inc. west of the Peach Orchard between the Emmitsburg road and Warfield Ridge. The corporation and airfield were operated in the 1920s by Herbert J. Fahy, an aeronautical record holder and former Air Service pilot who subsequently was a Lockheed test pilot. His wife, Clair May Fahy, also operated from the airfield and flew a Travel Air with Curtiss OX-5 in the 1929 Women's Air Derby. The airport was denied a 1928 state Public Service Commission charter to fly sightseers over the battlefield because it would compete with the Gettysburg Flying Service, where a new airport was built in 1942 and re-established in 1969.

After the first flights to Gettysburg in 1912, the airfield had been the 1918 Camp Colt, Pennsylvania, drill ground which was used as the 1919 Air Service Transcontinental Recruiting Convoy landing field by the All American Pathfinders (the 1922 USMC camp had over a dozen airplanes and a balloon). Air circuses were subsequently held at the Gettysburg National Military Park, and during World War II the Lee-Meade Inn near the Battlefield Airport was the Temple University camp of the Gettysburg School of Aeronautics.
