= Spangler Woods =

- Interactive map of Spangler Woods

Geography
- Location: Gettysburg National Military Park, Pennsylvania, United States
- Coordinates: 39.812°N 77.252°W

Spangler Woods is a Gettysburg Battlefield location used during the Battle of Gettysburg and is near the Virginia Monument. On July 2, 1863, Garnett's Brigade bivouacked on the border of the woods.
