= Pitzer Woods =

- Location within Pennsylvania
- Interactive map of Pitzer Woods

Geography
- Location: Pennsylvania, United States
- Coordinates: 39°48.279′N 77°15.375′W

Ecology
- Ecosystem: Gettysburg-Newark Lowlands

Pitzer Woods is a Gettysburg Battlefield site used for Gettysburg Battlefield camps after the American Civil War such as the 1933–37 Camp Renaissance Civilian Conservation Corps camp.

External images
- Pitzer Woods (NPS.gov)
- Pitzer Farm (WorldFlicks.org)

== History ==
Pitzer Woods was the site of July 1st & 2nd fighting during the 1863 Battle of Gettysburg. After the CCC camp closed, Fort Indiantown Gap used Pitzer Woods in 1941 and conducted aerial reconnaissance training using the battlefield. During 1943–4, Camp Sharpe used the Pitzer Woods camp ("in a muddy hollow at the bottom of a slanting road") to train soldiers for psychological operations in the European Theater of Operations. In 1946, agricultural laborers from the Bahamas (July 16) and Jamaica were housed on Seminary Ridge. The Pitzer Woods amphitheater was constructed in the 1960s, and the July 3, 1998 James Longstreet memorial was erected at the Pitzer Woods site that had been dedicated in 1941.
