= Seminary Ridge =

Dendritic ridge in the United States

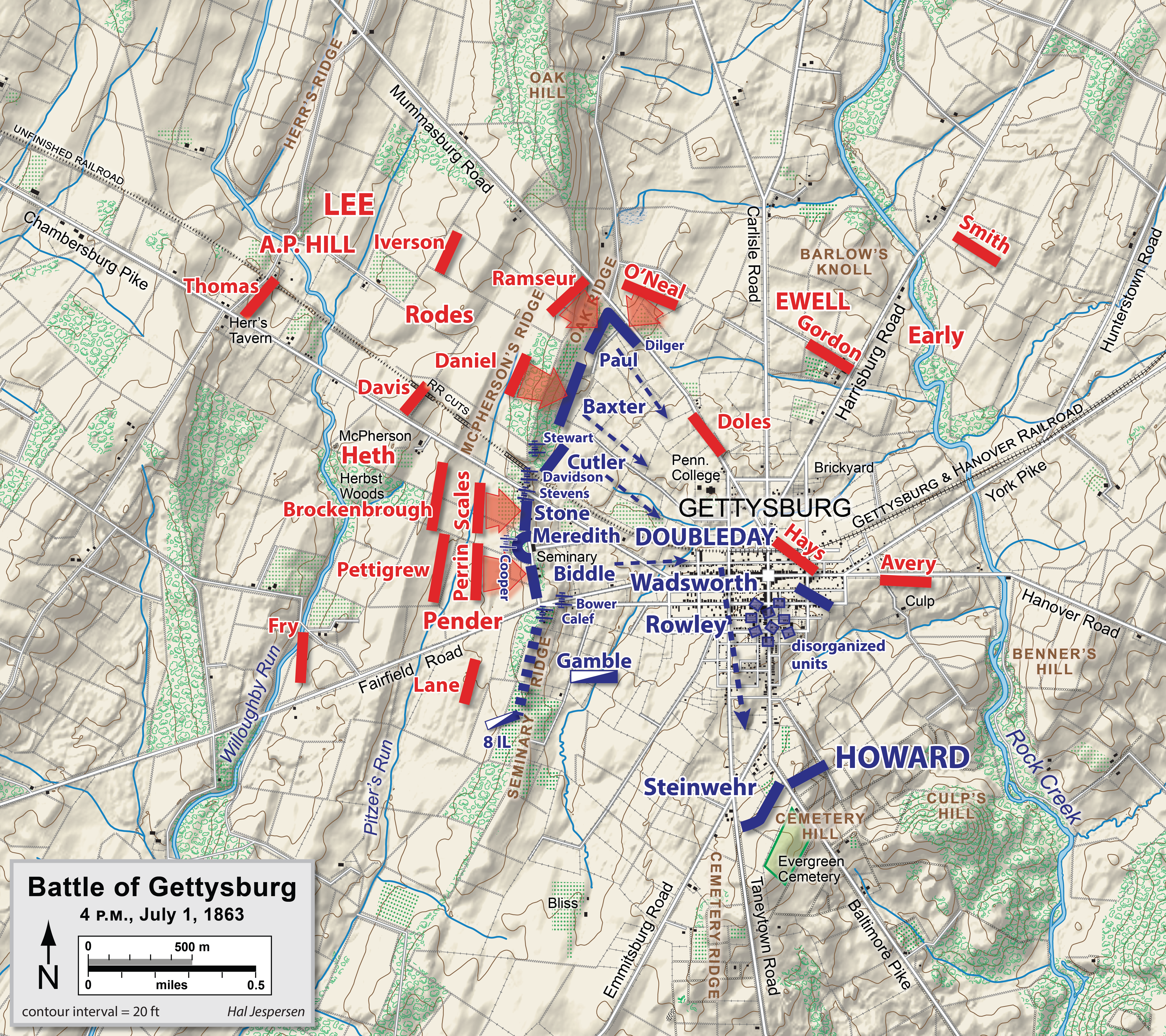
- July 1, 1863, at 4:00 p.m.: Union troops (blue) occupied Seminary Ridge.

Highest point
- Peak: driveway entrance, SW Confederate Av
- Elevation: 581.60 ft (177.27 m)

Naming
- Etymology: Lutheran Theological Seminary

Geography
- Location: Triple watershed point: Pitzer's Run (west) & both Stevens Creek/Plum Run (east)
- Country: United States
- State: Pennsylvania
- Range coordinates: 39°49′25″N 77°14′43″W
- Biome: Northern Piedmont ecoregion

Geology
- Rock types: Gettysburg-Newark Lowlands; Rossville Diabase dike (50 feet thick)

Seminary Ridge is a dendritic ridge that served as an area of military engagements during the Battle of Gettysburg, the bloodiest battle of the American Civil War, which was fought between July 1 and July 3, 1863 in and around Gettysburg, Pennsylvania. Seminary Ridge also served as a military installation during World War II.

== Geography ==
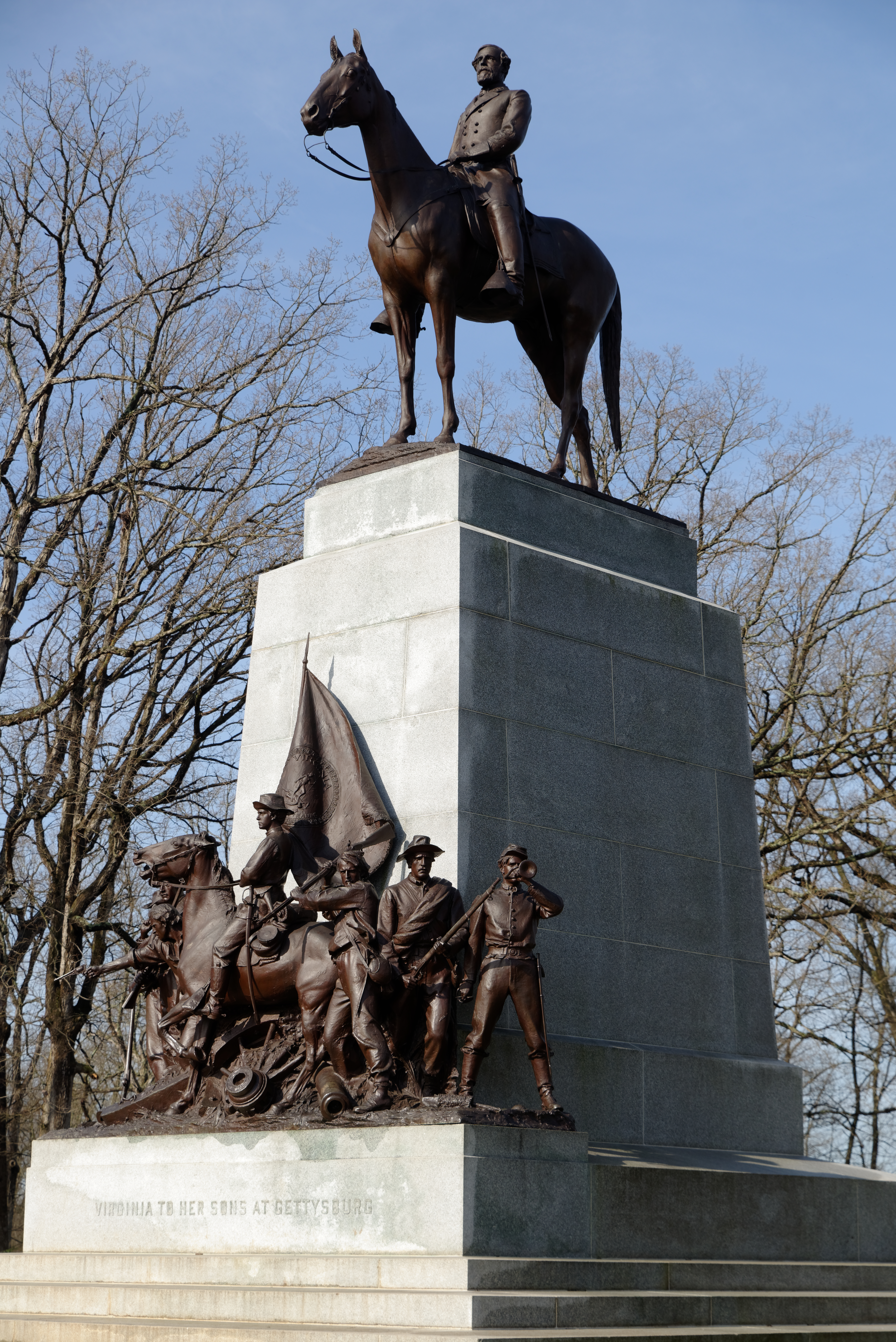
The Virginia Monument, erected in 1910 on Seminary Ridge

Seminary Ridge is a northern portion of the drainage divide between the Marsh Creek Watershed on the west and the Rock Creek Watershed on the east. At the south end of Oak Ridge, the northernmost portion of the divide, the north-south McPherson and Seminary ridges bifurcate southward at the triple watershed point of Willoughby's and Pitzer runs southward tributaries of Marsh Creek with a Rock Creek eastward tributary. From the triple point, Seminary Ridge extends southward to an area with eastward drainage into Stevens Creek, with the borough of Gettysburg.

Farther south into the Gettysburg National Park, Seminary Ridge continues as far as a branch of Pitzer Run, which divides the ridgeline (39.808173°N 77.255516°W), around which the drainage divide curves to the east. The ridgeline continues south of the branch, crossing the Millerstown Road. Between the Millerstown and Emmitsburg road crossings, the west side of the ridgeline is an elevated area (hornfel along the northwest edge of a diabase sheet) about 1 mile wide along the Emmitsburg Road. Along this east side of this elevated area, the ridgeline is Warfield Ridge, the southernmost portion of Seminary Ridge near the south end of the Gettysburg Battlefield. South of the tip of Seminary and Warfield Ridge tip, the Marsh and Rock creeks' drainage divide continues about four miles to near the Mason–Dixon line at their confluence to form Monocacy River.

The portion of Seminary Ridge on the western side of Gettysburg, Pennsylvania includes the railroad cut behind houses north of Buford Avenue and the historic Gettysburg Armory. Extending south are Schultz Woods, Spangler Woods, Berdan Woods, the McMillan Woods Youth Campground, Pitzer Woods, Biesecker's Woods, and the 1895 Longstreet Tower, which provides an observation platform for the "southern end" of Seminary Ridge (Warfield Ridge). Eisenhower National Historic Site, located on the west of the ridge, is visible from the tower.

Seminary Ridge Avenue and the sections of West Confederate Avenue to the northwest and southwest extend along the landform's ridgeline and provide access to numerous battle monuments on the ridge, including the prominent monument to Frederick William Sievers, known as the Virginia monument. Seminary Ridge is crossed by Buford and Springs Avenues and West Middle Street.

=== South Seminary Ridge ===
South Seminary Ridge is a Gettysburg Battlefield landform south of an east-west branch of Pitzer Run, which separates South Seminary Ridge from a separate landform to the north on the west of Gettysburg with the Lutheran Theological Seminary at Gettysburg. South of the Pitzer Run branch, the ridgeline of South Seminary Ridge extends from Pitzer Woods, across the Millerstown Road, past the Longstreet Tower to the Emmitsburg Road and on to the southernmost state memorial on the battlefield (Alabama), which is just west of the right flank marker for the Confederate Line.

Warfield Ridge is a portion of South Seminary Ridge southward to the Alabama Memorial, and the ridge landform continues southward out of the Gettysburg National Park to where Ridge Road is on the crest.

== History ==
In 1761, Samuel Gettys tavern was built near the ridge at the crossroads] east of Stevens Creek, and it preceded both the c. 1812 construction of the Chambersburg Pike across the ridge and the nearby "Gettysburg Theological Seminary" being established on the ridge on August 1, 1826.

In 1832, Old Dorm, now Schmucker Hall, was built, and Pennsylvania College (now Gettysburg College) was started on the east side of the ridge. On the ridge along the Chambersburg Pike, the Thaddeus Stevens building near the seminary (used for Robert E. Lee's 1863 headquarters) was built in 1834. At the time of the battle, the section of the ridge at the extension of West Middle St (the Hagerstown Rd) was known as "Haupt's Hill".

=== Civil War and postbellum ===
Seminary Ridge was the site of Battle of Gettysburg fighting on July 1, 1863, and the Pitzer Woods engagement on July 2. Robert E. Lee established his headquarters on the ridge just north of the Chambersburg pike, and the ridge also served as the Confederate line of battle for July 2 and 3 attacks against Union Army positions on Cemetery Ridge. On July 3, 500 men in George Pickett's division were killed or wounded on Seminary Ridge, including 88 lost in one regiment of Kemper's Brigade from the Federal artillery counterfire prior to Pickett's Charge. The last hospital patient of the seminary's Old Dorm left on September 16, 1863.

Longstreet Tower (No. 2 of five at Gettysburg) was built on the ridge by the War Department in 1895. West Confederate Avenue was built at the turn of the 20th century for Seminary Ridge tourism, while Sharpshooters Avenue (named Berdan Avenue by 1930) was extended from W Confederate Avenue in 1917 for access to a Pitzer Woods monument. In 1918, various military camp sites (e.g., Camp Colt) were located in the "Field of Pickett's Charge" between the Seminary and Cemetery ridges. The North Carolina Monument was placed on the ridge in 1929.

The Civilian Conservation Corps (CCC) built the 1938 Civil War veteran's camp for the 75th Anniversary of the Battle of Gettysburg and performed Gettysburg Battlefield landscaping through 1941. Construction had begun c. November 1933 for Gettysburg CCC camp "NP-2", which opened May 26, 1934 on Seminary Ridge and closed in 1941. Renamed from "MP-2", camp NP-2 was in McMillan Woods, while a different CCC camp was in Pitzer Woods ("MP-1"/"NP-1") from 1935 until closing in April 1937. The Pitzer's Woods camp was for reforestation and a 1933 "cyclone" blew all 45 tents down (200 trees were downed at the Round Tops). The "Gettysburg Company 1355, C.C.C." celebrated their 8th anniversary in 1941.

=== World War II and post-war ===
During 1943-4, Camp Sharpe at the former Pitzer Woods CCC camp NP-1 trained soldiers for psychological operations in the European Theater of Operations, and adjacent to Camp Sharpe was a 1944-6 POW camp at CCC camp NP-2 in McMillan Woods. Following the 1950 purchase of the Eisenhower farm, the US Secret Service monitored the tourists using the top of the nearby Longstreet Tower, and the Pitzer Woods amphitheater was constructed in the 1960s The Adams County Historical Society moved to the seminary's Old Dorm on the ridge in 1961, and the National Register of Historic Places added Old Dorm in 1974 (the Gettysburg Armory in 1990).

In 1982, the Tennessee State Memorial on West Confederate Avenue was the last confederate state memorial to be dedicated, and the memorial to James Longstreet was erected in Pitzer Woods in 1998 after being planned in 1941. The ridge's Historic Preservation Foundation at 61 Seminary Ridge Av was formed on April 29, 1999.
