= Military Vehicle Preservation Association =

Organization to preserve and study military vehicles

- Purpose: Preservation and study of military vehicles
- Website: www.mvpa.org
- Formerly called: Military Vehicle Collectors Club; International Military Vehicle Collectors Club

The Military Vehicle Preservation Association (MVPA) is an association whose mission is "To provide an international organization for military vehicle enthusiasts, historians, preservationists and collectors interested in the acquisition, restoration, preservation, safe operation and public education of historic military transport."

== History ==
The association was founded as the Military Vehicle Collectors Club (MVCC). Its name was later changed to the International Military Vehicle Collectors Club (IMVCC) to reflect the increasing interest and influx of non-American collectors. After several years, it changed to its current name.

In 2019, the group organized a cross country trip commemorating the 100th anniversary of the 1919 Motor Transport Corps convoy, which involved 81 Army vehicles traveling from Washington, DC to San Francisco. The re-enactment included over 40 classic military vehicles, and traveled from York, Pennsylvania to San Francisco. The group has completed five transcontinental convoys.

== Publications ==
MVPA's publication Army Motors began in 1976, with Supply Line (a spin-off of the Army Motors Supply Room section) joining in 1978. Army Motors offered articles and photography without advertising, while Supply Line focused on restoring tips, parts, and products, with advertising.

The two publications were later combined to create History in Motion, published by the Military Vehicle Preservation Association Historic Archives.
