= John B. Bachelder =

American historian

John Badger Bachelder
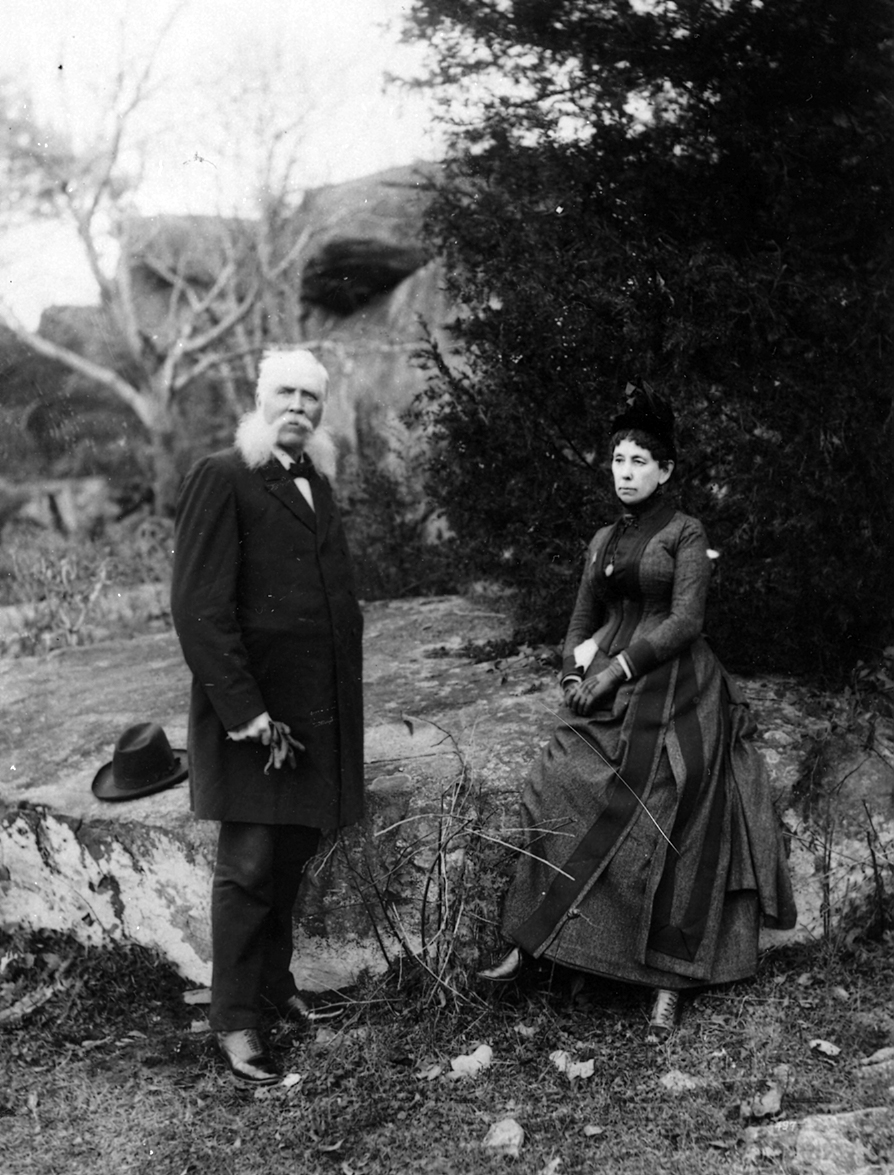
- John B. Bachelder and his wife Elizabeth at the Gettysburg battlefield in 1888.
- Born: September 29, 1825; Gilmanton, New Hampshire
- Died: December 22, 1894 (aged 69); Hyde Park, Massachusetts
- Burial place: Nottingham, New Hampshire
- Military career
- Allegiance: United States of America; Union
- Branch: Union Army
- Rank: Civilian combat artist
- Conflicts: American Civil War
- Other work: historian, portrait and landscape painter, lithographer, and photographer

John Badger Bachelder (September 29, 1825 – December 22, 1894) was a portrait and landscape painter, lithographer, and photographer, but best known as the preeminent 19th-century historian of the Battle of Gettysburg in the American Civil War. He was a dominant factor in the preservation and memorialization of the Gettysburg Battlefield in the latter part of the century.

== Early life ==
Bachelder was born in Gilmanton, New Hampshire. He was educated at Captain Alden Partridge's Military School in Pembroke and then at an academy in Gilmanton. He eventually moved to Reading, Pennsylvania, to work at a school that would later become known as the Pennsylvania Military Institute, becoming its principal in 1851. He became involved with the Pennsylvania state militia and was appointed a colonel in 1852, a title that was associated with him the rest of his life.

In 1853 Bachelder returned to New Hampshire, where he married Elizabeth Barber Stevens, and began his career as an artist. Elizabeth was a niece to Gen. Benjamin Butler. From his brief association with military topics, he retained a lifelong interest in them, and when the Civil War began in 1861, he was already collecting notes on Bunker Hill, planning to paint an accurate rendition of the battle. When he realized that reliable materials were hard to locate, he decided to accompany the Union Army of the Potomac in hopes of being present at a decisive battle. There, he would be able to examine the topography of the battlefield, interview participants, and publish a written and illustrated history of the battle.

Bachelder was a welcome accompaniment to the Army, as evidenced by a number of letters in his personal papers from prominent generals who complimented him on his work. For example, Brig. Gen. John C. Caldwell wrote in early 1863, "At Fair Oaks, Virginia, I frequently met Mr. Bachelder, at that time making sketches of various phases of the Battle of Seven Pines and Fair Oaks. Several of the sketches were shown to me, and I think them by far the most accurate of any I have ever seen."

== Gettysburg ==
Bachelder's map of the battlefield

Bachelder's most noted work, which would occupy a good portion of the remainder of his life, was after the Battle of Gettysburg, July 1–3, 1863. He studied the terrain via horseback and drew an isometric map of the battlefield. He visited field hospitals, interviewed wounded soldiers of both armies, and determined the position on his map of every unit engaged in the battle. That fall he published a panoramic view of Gettysburg. During visits to the Army's winter quarters, he claims to have interviewed the commanders of every regiment and battery in the Army of the Potomac. He later organized reunions on the field and accompanied veterans over the terrain and placed wooden stakes into the ground to identify important points of the battle.

In 1870, noted artist James Walker was commissioned by Bachelder to paint an account of Pickett's Charge, entitled "The Repulse of Longstreet's Assault at the Battle of Gettysburg," a massive work that measured 7.5 by 20 feet. Bachelder wrote an accompanying guidebook and toured widely with the canvas, lecturing across the United States. In 1873, he published a guidebook to the battle, which was well received by the public.

Bachelder's contribution to Gettysburg was more than artistic. From 1883 to 1887, he served in the position as Superintendent of Tablets and Legends for the Gettysburg Battlefield Memorial Association, and is probably responsible more than any man for the placement of monuments and battlefield markers, both Union and Confederate. He coined the phrase "Copse of Trees" and invented the concept of a "High Water Mark of the Confederacy" at which the famous Pickett's Charge peaked. All but a few monuments on the battlefield bear some of his influence.

In 1880, President Rutherford B. Hayes signed into law a bill that provided $50,000 to Bachelder to write a detailed history of the battle of Gettysburg. Bachelder based his manuscript on the Official Records and the interviews he had done, but he has been criticized by some historians because his personal interviews, which would be considered more accurate than reports compiled years after the event, affected only about 10% of the 2,550 pages that he sent to Washington in October 1886. Southern historians also complained that he chose to interview very few Confederate officers.

Bachelder's activities at Gettysburg were described in detail by Senator Wade Hampton of South Carolina on March 17, 1880, in a report to the Senate from its Military Affairs Committee:

It appears that Mr. Bachelder, having the advantage of a military education, and love of history, went to the front early in 1862, more than a year before the battle of Gettysburg, to be in a position to collect data when the most important battle of the War was fought. After working up the details of several engagements, he reached the battlefield of Gettysburg before the dead were buried, remaining for eighty-four days, making plans of the field, visiting the wounded in hospital, and by permission taking the convalescent officers over the field, by whom their positions and movements were pointed out and established. During this period books full of notes from these actors were secured within a few weeks of the battle. With this information and sketches thus secured, he visited the Army of the Potomac, spending the winter of 1863–64 in consultation with the officers of every regiment and battery, whose conversations and explanations were carefully noted and preserved. At the close of the war, Mr. Bachelder issued an invitation to the many officers whose acquaintance he had made to visit Gettysburg with him for historical purposes, which was accepted by over one thousand; forty-nine of them generals commanding. From the acquaintance thus secured has resulted, during the past sixteen years, a most valuable correspondence regarding the battle of Gettysburg.

— Senator Wade Hampton, March 17, 1880, Report of U.S. Senate Military Affairs Committee

== Death ==
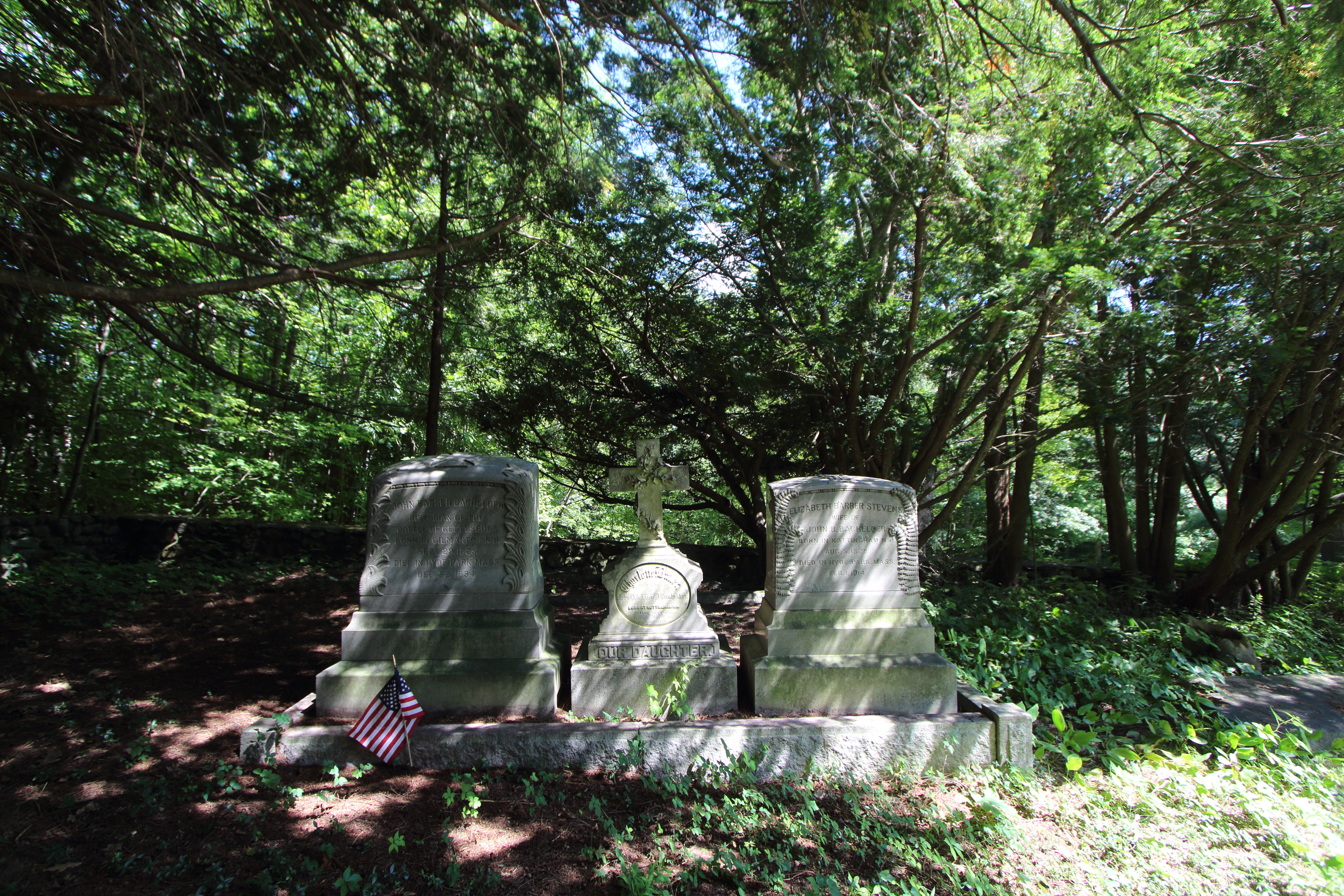
The gravestones of John B. Bachelder, his daughter Charlotte, and his wife, Elizabeth.

Bachelder died of pneumonia in Hyde Park, Massachusetts, in 1894. His body was then transported the 79 miles to be buried alongside his only child, Charlotte who had died at age 13. Their graves are located in a small family cemetery on Stevens Hill Road in Nottingham, New Hampshire, close to the family home. His widow, Elizabeth, died in 1914 and was interred alongside her husband and daughter.
