= All American Pathfinders =

The All American Pathfinders aeroplane unit was a squadron with 13 aircraft and associated road vehicles used in the "1919 Air Service Transcontinental Recruiting Convoy" from Hazelhurst Field to California that began on August 14, 1919. The convoy was en route to California simultaneously with the 1919 Motor Transport Corps convoy and included a "Balloon and Airship section" and a "Searchlight and Field Lighting section" (the convoy commander, Major Ora M. Baldinger, operated the unit as a "mobile army post".) The convoy was over 1/2 mile long and was "to secure accurate information to be used in connection with the carrying of mails by airplanes, and for military purposes, as well as commercial purposes."

Airfields used by the squadron included:

- August 16, Gettysburg Battlefield—drill ground of the former Camp Colt, Pennsylvania
- Columbus, Ohio—9 Curtiss planes used the field
- August 28, Shillington, Pennsylvania near Reading—2 Curtiss JN4 and a big Curtiss photographic plane were behind the main body of the convoy.
