= Camp Sharpe =

American military installation

Camp George M. Sharpe
- Gettysburg, Pennsylvania in United States

Site information
- Type: Training facility POW Camp
- Owner: Department of Defense (during operations); National Park Service (after closure)
- Operator: United States Army
- Open to the public: Yes

Location
- Location of Camp Sharpe in Adams County, PA
- Coordinates: 39°48′58.723″N 77°14′8.916″W

Site history
- Built: May 1944
- Built by: War Manpower Commission
- Fate: Removed and land absorbed into the Gettysburg NMP
- Demolished: 1947
- Events: World War II

Garrison information
- Past commanders: Capt. Laurence Thomas (1944-45); Capt. James W. Copley (1945-46)
- Occupants: 2nd-5th Mobile Radio Broadcast Cos., Psychological Warfare Division (1944–1945) (several hundred soldiers,

Camp Sharpe was a World War II military installation located on the Gettysburg Battlefield that trained soldiers for psychological operations (e.g., morale operations) in the European Theater of Operations (see Operation Cornflakes & Frontpost newspaper).

== History ==
Adjacent to Civilian Conservation Corps (CCC) camp NP-2 in McMillan Woods, Camp Sharpe used camp CCC NP-1 and was located "in a muddy hollow at the bottom of a slanting road". A USO facility for Camp Sharpe soldiers was located at the former Hill house on Chambersburg Street in nearby Gettysburg, Pennsylvania.

After Camp Sharpe closed in 1944, USO operations were moved sometime around January 1945 to "the recreation center for the guards" of the Gettysburg POW camp. The former camp was used for migrant workers in the summer of 1945.
