= Hancock station =

Hancock
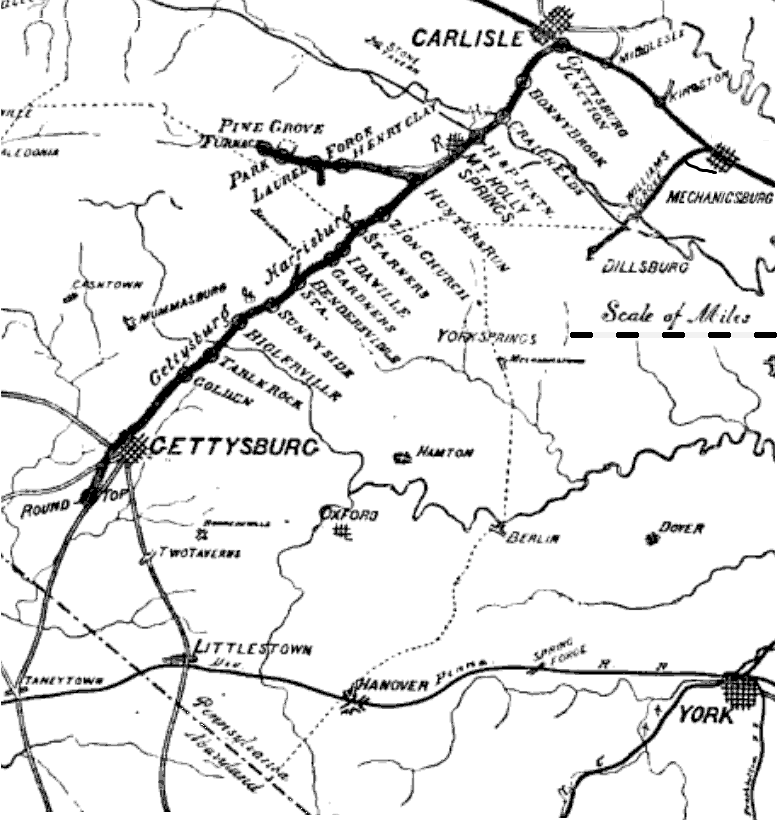
- Hancock Station was between the Gettysburg and Round Top Stations (left).

General information
- Location: Adams, Pennsylvania; United States
- Coordinates: 39.8086°N 77.2372°W
- Line: Round Top Branch

History
- Opened: c. 1884

Services
Preceding station	Reading Railroad	Following station
Round Top Terminus	Round Top Branch	Gettysburg toward Harrisburg
Location

Hancock was a Gettysburg Battlefield station of the Gettysburg and Harrisburg Railroad (the Reading's Gettysburg and Harrisburg Railway in 1891) near the Tammany and Vermont monuments. The station was used at the end of the memorial association era and through the commemorative era for delivering tourists and materials (e.g., sculpted granite for monuments) such as for the 1910 Pennsylvania State Memorial and 1913 Gettysburg reunion. Before the G & H denied use of the steamtrain line, the Gettysburg Electric Railway considered placing a generator plant at the station for the electric trolley, but the trolley plant and its coal yard were instead built diagonal from the borough's G & H RR station.
