= Camp George G. Meade =

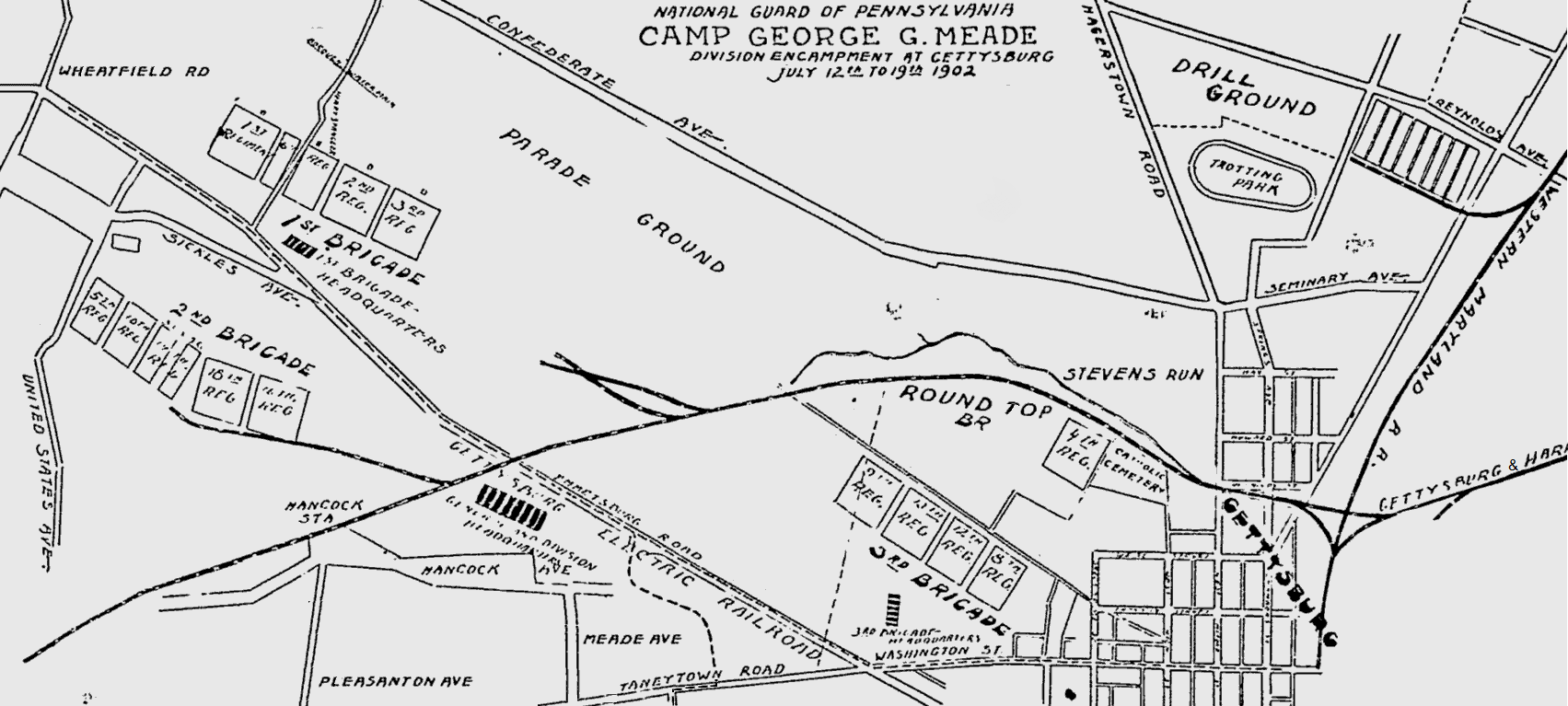
In addition to the 3 National Guard brigades, War Department troops encamped at the "Drill Ground".

Camp George G. Meade was one of the Gettysburg Battlefield camps after the American Civil War for Pennsylvania National Guard training of the Keystone Division (cf. Camp Gettysburg). The military installation's structures on the Gettysburg Battlefield were subsequently used in the battlefield's commemorative and development eras, e.g., for a WWI recruiting and Tank Corps camp, the 1913 Gettysburg reunion, and the Third Corps camp during the 1938 Gettysburg reunion.

== History ==
Planned as "Camp Lawton", quartermasters erected the installation's buildings by July 2, 1902, which included headquarters at The Angle, the National Guard commissary along the Round Top Branch, the telegraph and telephone office at the "junction of the steam and electric roads near the Codori buildings", the Governor's Troop between the Hagerstown road and Chambersburg pike, and U.S. Army troops camped near the Reynolds equestrian statue on McPherson Ridge. On July 11 Fort Myer's United States Cavalry and Artillery arrived to camp at Reynolds Avenue on McPherson Ridge. By October 1914 the commissary—which was used as an arsenal between encampments—had been razed, in 1917 the Gettysburg Electric Railway tracks were removed, c. 1942 the Round Top Branch was removed, and in 2011 the fencing of the Field of Pickett's Charge was restored.
