= Round Top Museum =

The Round Top Museum was a Gettysburg Battlefield visitor attraction established by John H. Rosensteel in 1888 on the north foot of Little Round Top near the Round Top Station and northeast of the Wheatfield Road and Grand Central Avenue (now Sedgwick Av) intersection. The museum of Battle of Gettysburg artifacts was in Rosensteel's 1884 frame home and served as the "Round Top inn" restaurant/small hotel. On the east side of the residence, construction began in March 1902 for a "dancing pavilion" lit with acetelyne lamps that opened on May 25, 1902. A 1906 hop was held at the "Little Round Top Hotel", the "Round Top dance pavilion" was the site of a 1918 fire and a 1925 stabbing, and picnics at Rosensteel Park were held as late as 1957. The facility also included a store where a Camp Renaissance CCC worker committed a theft in 1936.

The Round Top Museum and the 1921 Rosensteel electric map museum on Cemetery Ridge were owned by the Gettysburg National Museum corporation until 1964, and the Round Top Museum became part of the Gettysburg National Military Park in 1971 which used the building as an environmental resource center until it was demolished c. 1982. Part of the museum's collection is in the GNMP's set of 43,000 American Civil War artifacts displayed in the 2008 Gettysburg Museum and Visitor Center.
