= Round Top Park =

Former excursion park in Gettysburg, Pennsylvania

Round Top Park was an excursion park located in Gettysburg, Pennsylvania, near the end of the Round Top Branch and owned by the Gettysburg & Harrisburg Railroad. It operated from 1884 to 1896. In addition to amusements, the park provided services during the memorial association era for steamtrain and trolley tourists visiting nearby military sites of the Battle of Gettysburg.

== History ==
The "dummy" Baldwin steam engine began to bring guests to the area in June 1884. Ephram H. Minnigh was the park's manager at the time. On July 4, 1884, Colonel John H. McClellan held a free ox roast at the park to benefit the Carlisle Indian Industrial School. In 1886, the Gettysburg Battlefield Memorial Association purchased the grove in and around Round Top. In 1889, the Pennsylvania Reserves held a reunion in the park.

The park featured several amenities, including a covered pavilion, a dining pavilion, a dance pavilion, and a cook house. Amusements at Round Top Park included target shooting and a merry-go-round. This merry-go-round was put up for sale in 1894. In 1896, GBMA removed several of the park's buildings, marking the end of the park's usage as an excursion park. On July 4, 1900, the land was used by the Tacony Rifles as a camp.
