= Camp Gettysburg =

- Type: PA National Guard encampment
- Location: Gettysburg Battlefield, Pennsylvania

History
- Date: August 1884

After the American Civil War, Camp Gettysburg was the Pennsylvania National Guard encampment that extending from Seminary Ridge. The new Round Top Branch was used to outfit the camp (e.g., lumber for tent floors was shipped from New Oxford on July 22.) The new reservoir at Marsh Creek supplied the camp's water, and military drills included rifle matches at 200, 300, and 500 yards.
