= Camp Lawton =

Camp Lawton may refer to:

- Camp Lawton (Georgia), an 1864 Confederate States of America prisoner of war camp located in Lawtonville, Georgia
- Camp Lawton (Gettysburg Battlefield), the Gettysburg Battlefield camps after the American Civil War in Pennsylvania
- Camp Lawton (BSA) a Boy Scout Camp in Arizona

== See also ==
- Fort Lawton, a former United States Army post in Seattle, Washington
