= Eternal Light Peace Memorial =

1938 Gettysburg Battlefield monument

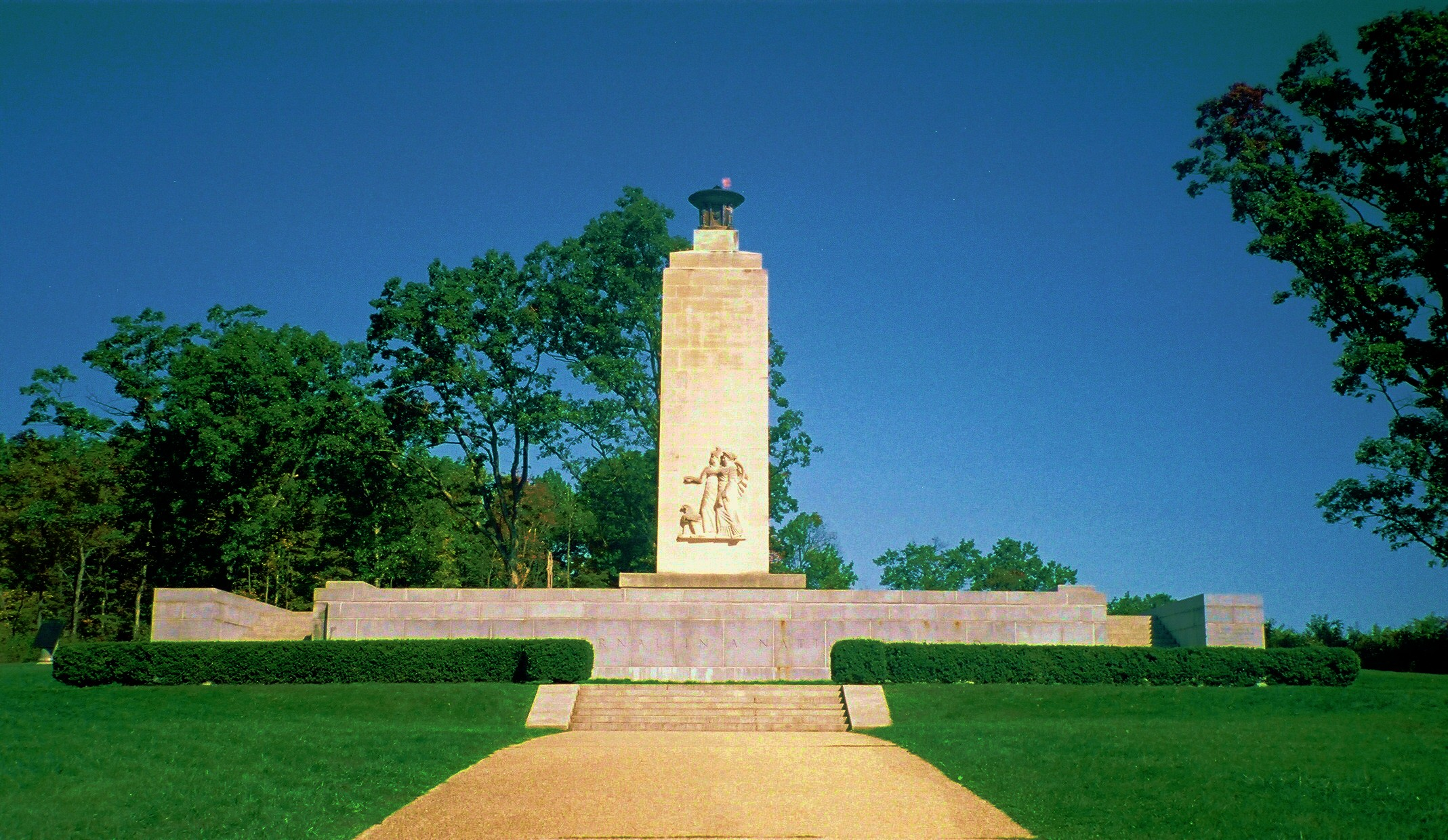
- The memorial has "The Flame of Eternal Peace" and relief sculptures of two women and an American eagle.
- Interactive map of Eternal Light Peace Memorial
- Location: Gettysburg National Military Park
- Coordinates: 39.84845°N 77.24345°W
- Designer: Paul Philippe Cret; Lee Lawrie
- Type: Historic district contributing structure
- Dedicated date: July 3, 1938
- Website: Park Scenes (nps.gov)

The Eternal Light Peace Memorial is a 1938 Gettysburg Battlefield monument dedicated on July 3, 1938, commemorating the 1913 Gettysburg reunion for the 50th anniversary of the 1863 Battle of Gettysburg on July 3, 1913. The natural gas flame in a one-ton bronze urn is atop a tower on a stone pedestrian terrace with views from the terraced hill summit over about 400 sq mi (1,000 km^{2}), and the flame is visible from 20 mi (32 km) away.

== History ==
In 1887, "the Philadelphia Brigade, Col. Cowan and others" advocated a "grand monument to American Heroism on this battlefield", and President William McKinley spoke to Cowan about north–south peace in 1900. The "first tentative program" of October 1910 for the 1913 Gettysburg reunion planned a "Peace Jubilee" to be held on "National Day" with an oration by President Woodrow Wilson and the cornerstone placement for the "Great Peace Memorial" at noon. However, after being "presented, January 11th, 1912, to the Joint Committee of the Congress [for] the Celebration of the Fiftieth Anniversary of the Battle of Gettysburg", funding was "found, in March 1912, impossible of accomplishment in the 62nd Congress". Instead of the laying of a cornerstone, on July 3 during the New York Veterans' Celebration in the 1913 Great Tent, Colonel Andrew Cowan gave a speech advocating the memorial, and "steps to accomplish such purpose were immediately taken … which resulted in the Gettysburg Peace Memorial Association being formed. … That Association's Bill was, on December 20th, 1913, presented to Congress…creating the Gettysburg Memorial Commission."

The original plan was for a $250,000 "monument of peace" at The Angle, but despite 1914 "Peace Memorial Bill" presentations to the US House of Representatives that compared the planned memorial with Christ the Redeemer of the Andes and the Lincoln Memorial, federal funding remained "postponed". In August 1936, the memorial's commission issued 10,000 four page circulars to publicize the plan, and Virginia in 1936 was the first to appropriate funds. In 1937 the Pennsylvania legislature began planning a peace memorial on Big Round Top, and the state's "Peace Memorial Bill" was signed on February 24, 1937, to appropriate $5,000 for the state's "Gettysburg Peace Memorial fund". The peace memorial committee selected from the 6 designs by August 1937 and on December 10, 1937, Lee Lawrie was announced as the sculptor for the structure "overlooking Big Round Top [and] Little Round Top". With additional funding by New York, Indiana, Tennessee, Illinois, and Wisconsin; the $60,000 monument was instead completed northwest of Gettysburg, Pennsylvania. Groundbreaking was on February 14, and the last foot of piping for the flame's gas supply was placed on May 31.

=== Dedication ===
Attendance for the memorial's dedication at the 1938 Gettysburg reunion on July 3 was 250,000; a further 100,000 attempted to attend but failed to arrive due to congested roads. President Franklin D. Roosevelt arrived at a temporary platform on his special train via the Reading Railroad from the North after leaving Springwood at Hyde Park NY that morning. The U.S. 3d Cavalry Division escorted the President's motorcade to the memorial on Oak Hill, and Roosevelt's open car arrived with a 21 gun salute.

Roosevelt used "a new Mobile sound system unit" to address the audience including the veterans on specially-constructed grandstands under a canopy. As his nine-minute speech ended at sunset, the Peace Memorial covered by a 50-foot flag was unveiled by Union veteran George N. Lockwood and Confederate veteran A. G. Harris (both age 91) with two regular army attendants a photocell automatically lit the flame Grand Army of the Republic chaplain Martin V. Stone ended the ceremony with a benediction prayer, and on the way to his car Roosevelt spoke with the oldest attending veteran, William Barnes of the US Colored Troops, age 112. A Sixth Field Artillery battery near Oak Hill fired a 21 gun salute as the President departed at 7 p.m. (His train to Washington used the Western Maryland Railway.)

The flame was reduced to a pilot light during World War II (from December 25, 1941) and just prior to the 1946 Paris peace conference, President Truman commented about the inscribed motto, Peace Eternal in a Nation United: "That is what we want, but let's change that word (nation) to world and we'll have something." The deteriorated Alabama limestone in the lower section that had been approved for use by the Bureau of Standards was replaced with gray granite in June 1941, and repairs were also made in 1950. A 1962 protest against nuclear arms and testing was held at the memorial, and the flame was extinguished in 1974 for the oil crisis after the 93rd United States Congress prohibited such flames (except for the John F. Kennedy Eternal Flame), and the extinguished gas flame was replaced by an electrical light in 1976. A Gettysburg Peace Celebration committee had been formed by June 1988, and the gas flame was restored at their Fiftieth Anniversary Rededication on July 3.

=== Speeches ===
On the 125th anniversary of the Battle of Gettysburg, from July 1 through July 3, 1988, Carl Sagan gave a speech written by himself and his wife Ann Druyan, dubbed the "50th re-dedication of the Eternal Light Peace Memorial".

Sagan's speech compared the events of what is considered the first mechanized war, the Battle of Gettysburg, all the way through and up to the proliferation of nuclear weapons. As he called it, "From Gettysburg to the blockbuster. A billion times more explosive force from Gettysburg to today. The souls that perished here would find such carnage unspeakable."

The entire speech was made available on November 9, 2023, by the official CarlSaganDotCom YouTube channel. The source material was shot and provided by the Department of the Interior. National Park Service. and is now part of the series, 'Part of Series: Moving Images Relating to National Parks, 1970 - 1990 with the National Archives Identifier, NAID 75495622/Local Identifier 79-HFC-346. A copy of the speech is archived on Internet Archive for historical reference and preservation.
