= Emmor Cope =

American architect

Emmor Bradley Cope
- Born: July 23, 1834; East Bradford Township, Chester County, Pennsylvania, US
- Died: May 28, 1927 (aged 92); Gettysburg, Pennsylvania, US
- Burial place: Evergreen Cemetery (Gettysburg, Pennsylvania); 39.820391°N 77.230196°W
- Military career
- Allegiance: United States
- Branch: (United States) Union Army
- Service years: June 4, 1861 - June 26, 1865 (Sergeant: June 10, 1861; artillery Corporal: April 1862; commissioned April 25, 1864; Capt of Engineers: April 20, 1864)
- Rank: Major: February 9, 1865 (Bvt Lt Col: June 26, 1865)
- Battles: 26
- Other work: 1861: machinist, Copesville, PA; 1893 July: Topographic Engineer; Chief of Engineers, GNPC; 1st Superintendent, GNMP; 1927: oldest US Civil Service employee

Emmor Bradley Cope (23 July 1834 – 28 May 1927) was an American Civil War officer of the Union Army noted for the "Map of the Battlefield of Gettysburg from the original survey made August to October, 1863", which he researched by horseback as a sergeant after being ordered back to Gettysburg by Maj. Gen. George G. Meade. Cope is also noted for commemorative era battlefield administration and designs, including the layout of the 1913 Gettysburg reunion. Cope had enlisted as a Private of Company A, (First Pennsylvania Reserves), temporarily detached to Battery C, 5th U.S. Artillery, and mustered out as a V Corps aide-de-camp of Maj Gen Gouverneur K. Warren.

On July 17, 1893, Cope was appointed the Topographical Engineer of the Gettysburg National Park Commission (established for "ascertaining the extent of... the trolley") and oversaw the 1893-5 battlefield survey with benchmark at the Gettysburg center square. By 1904, Cope was the first park superintendent, and, after the commission became defunct in March 1922 when the last commissioner died, became the battlefield head through the remainder of the commemorative era of the Gettysburg National Military Park.

Cope's designs include structures (e.g., the original park "gateway"), markers (1908 GNMP bronze tablet/granite monolith), buildings (the 1903 Roller and Storage Building), roads (Cross, Brooke, and De Trobriand avenues), and the observation tower at Gettysburg and Valley Forge. He oversaw the development of post-war maps drawn by GNPC cartographer Schuyler A. Hammond, as well as a 14 ft (4.3 m) wooden relief map of the battlefield by J. C. Wierman for the 1904 Louisiana Purchase Exposition (on display at the Gettysburg Museum and Visitor Center).

Emmor Cope is buried with his wife along the outside of the Gettysburg National Cemetery fence near the New York State Memorial, and had a daughter and son: Jean Wible and John B. Cope (1877-1903).

Cope's 1996 biography is If You Seek His Monument- Look Around: E.B. Cope and the Gettysburg National Military Park.

== Designs ==
Over 40 historic district contributing structures were designed by Emmor Cope, including:

- Observation towers at five Gettysburg locations beginning with the 1895 Big Round Top Observation Tower and the 1906 Valley Forge Observation Tower
- c. 1896 Gettysburg National Military Park "gateway at the entrance to Hancock avenue on the Taneytown road"
- 35 cast iron site ID tablets ("guide" tablets)
- 1909 US Regulars monument

External image
- 1904 Gettysburg relief map by Cope
