= Round Top Station =

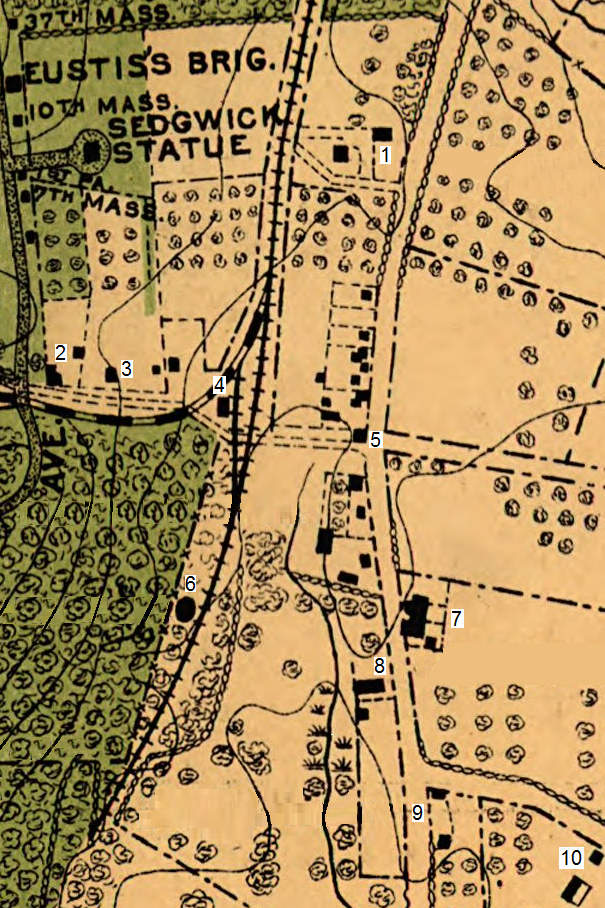
- By 1916, Round Top Station had a siding of the Round Top Branch that used the Gettysburg Electric Railway
- Interactive map of the Round Top Station area

General information
- Type: train station
- Location: Wheatfield Road, Round Top, United States
- Coordinates: 39.79442°N 77.232395°W
- Opened: 1884

Round Top Station was the southernmost station of the Gettysburg and Harrisburg Railroad and was located west of a blacksmith shop along the Taneytown Road that was in operation in 1880.

== History ==
Despite the 1882 survey of a rail route from the "H. J., H. and G. Railroad" to Round Top, Pennsylvania, for the Round-Top Railroad Company, the competing G&H RR purchased property from Lewis A. Bushman in April 1884 for excursions (Little Round Top Park), and their Round Top Branch was instead being constructed in May 1884. The station warehouse was completed June 21, 1884 (burned February 22/23, 1889; rebuilt by August 1891); and to the rear of the warehouse in 1894 on a different railway from the west, the Gettysburg Electric Railway began trolley operations (Note: "Story of Old Trolley Line Told to Club". April 30, 1952. NOTE: North of the Round Top station on the Round Top Branch was the Hancock Station near the battlefield's Vermont Memorial on Grand Central Avenue ("Hancock" Av by 1886).) The railroad-owned property along the north side of Wheatfield Rd extended eastward from the railway and had frontage along the Taneytown Rd at the corner, site of the 1895 Ollie Rouzer blacksmith shop. The north-south steamtrain railbed at Round Top became the east edge of the Gettysburg National Military Park (GNMP), which is adjacent to the private tracts along the Taneytown Road; and between 1904 and 1916 a siding was created at the station. The station operated until c. 1942 when the branch's abandonment application was filed.
