= Battle of Peach Orchard =

The Battle of Peach Orchard may refer to:

- The Battle of Peach Orchard during the Battle of Nashville.
- The engagement fought in The Peach Orchard during the Battle of Gettysburg.
