= Round Top hospitals =

Coordinates: 39.792°N 77.237°W

The Round Top hospitals during the Battle of Gettysburg were located at the Little Round Top side of the Gettysburg Battlefield at two houses now in the community of Round Top, Pennsylvania, United States.

== Plank hospital ==
A Union 1st Division field hospital was temporarily located at the Round Top farm of Levi and Mary Plank. The farmhouse is located near the local crest of the Taneytown Rd, but in 1863 "on the morning of July 3 [the hospital] was moved to the M. Fissel Farm east of Rock Creek". The stone house on the road's west side (#921 Taneytown Rd), and the farm's barn was on the opposite side of the road (#920) until it burned in 1967. In 1916, the home was the site of an accidental shooting of the local blacksmith's daughter, aged 12, who survived with the cranial bullet and became the Round Top schoolmarm.

== Group hospital ==
The John & Harriet Group house along the road now named Sachs Rd was the field hospital where "General Taylor died in the house and was buried in [the] garden, but his body was removed several days later. Mrs. Barlow frequently visited the house" (General Francis C. Barlow had been taken to the house after being wounded at Barlow Knoll and initially being treated at the Josiah Benner farm near the Harrisburg Road bridge over Rock Creek. The farm of 34 acres (14 ha) was subsequently purchased by the Group's son, Jacob, in 1891.
