= Round Top, Pennsylvania =

Unincorporated community in Pennsylvania, US

Round Top Round-Top
- Unincorporated community
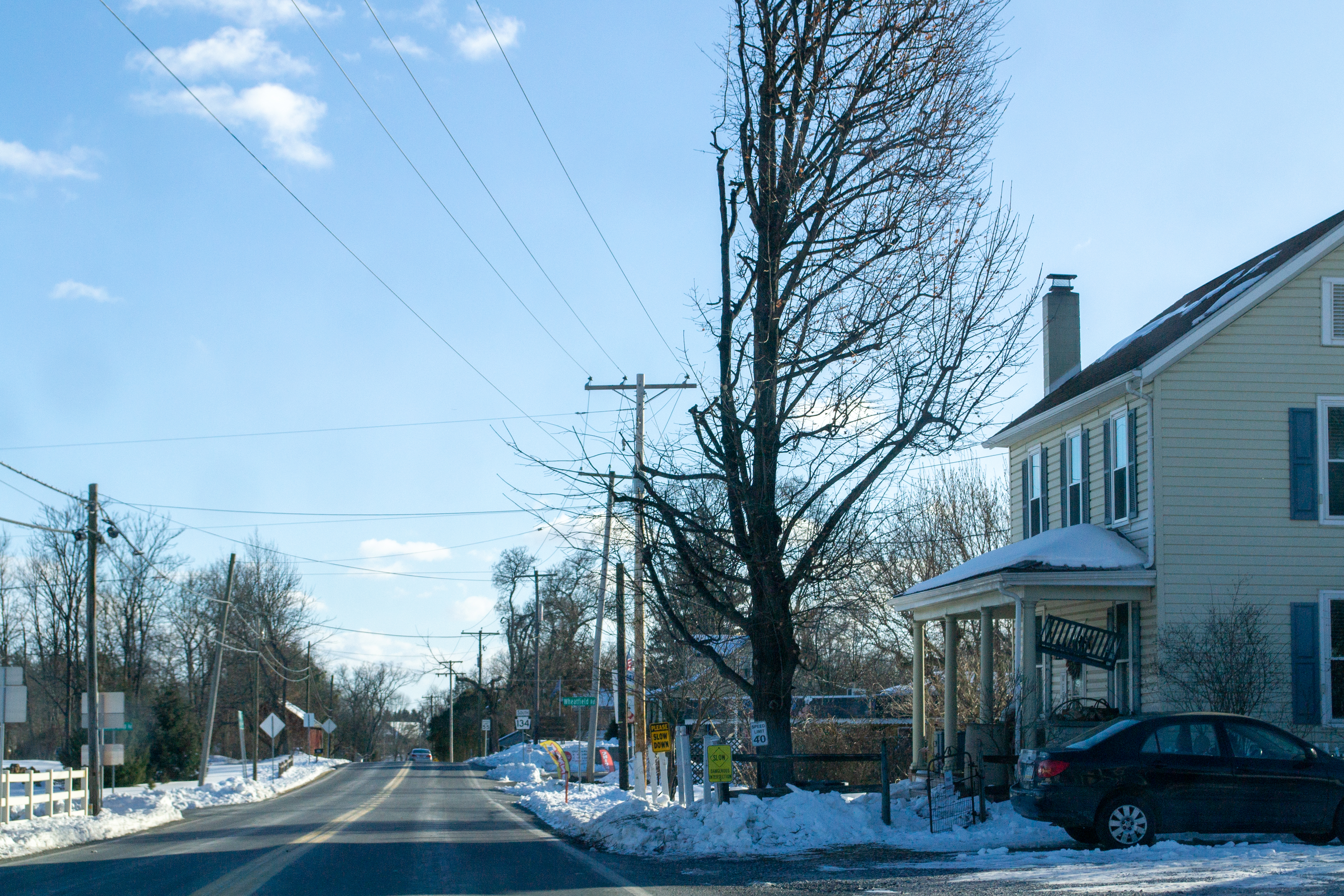
- Round Top, Pennsylvania in wintertime
- Etymology: "Round-Top R. R. Station"
- Round Top is between the Maryland/Pennsylvania state line and Gettysburg, Pennsylvania.
- Coordinates: 39.794792°N 77.23305°W
- Country: United States
- State: Pennsylvania
- County: Adams
- Township: Cumberland
- Established: c. 1880
- Time zone: UTC-5 (EST)
  - Summer (DST): UTC-4 (EDT)
- ZIP Code: 17325
- Area code: 717
- GNIS ID: 1185538 (1979)

Round Top is a populated place in Adams County in the U.S. state of Pennsylvania, near Little Round Top. It is notable for two Battle of Gettysburg hospitals, the 1884 Round Top Station, and several battlefield commemorative era attractions such as Round Top Park and the Round Top Museum. The unincorporated community lies on an elevated area of the north–south Taneytown Road with three intersections: at Blacksmith Shop Road to the northeast, Wheatfield Road (west from "Roundtop"), and Sachs Road (east from "Sedgwick").

== History ==
After an 1808 proposal, the Taneytown Road was constructed southward from Gettysburg past the east of the Round Tops and by 1858, two crossroads had been built to the area, with three homes (north-to-south: "Geo Bishop", "E. Brickert", & "J. Group") that would become Round Top: Wheatfield Rd on the west across the north foot of Little Round Top to the Emmitsburg Road and Sachs Rd eastward across Rock Creek. In 1884, the Gettysburg and Harrisburg Railroad built a steamtrain railroad to the Round Top Station, which operated until c. 1942 when the branch's abandonment application was filed. In 1894 on a different railway from the west, the Gettysburg Electric Railway began trolley operations to the station.

Sedgwick Post Office

After an 1884 refreshment stand opened in a "shanty at the base of Little Round Top", the 1884 house of postmaster Lewis A. Bushman was announced on July 20, 1886, as the location for the Sedgwick Post Office, which opened on August 2. In addition to serving the local area until Rural Free Delivery began, the post office was the transfer point for mail southward on the Taneytown Rd to Horner's Mill near Rock Creek and its subsequent 1890 Barlow post office. Bushman offered the Sedgwick Post Office and Store Room tract for sale with a chopping mill, peach orchard, and warehouse on July 28, 1891; and S. V. Bushman had the merchant license in 1892 and sold the tract to James F. Rider in 1901. Rider, who near Round Top in 1888 had sold his father's tract of 13 acres (5.3 ha) with "lot of fruit and grapes", operated the Sedgwick store through 1915; and Charles C. Rider offered the tract with 8 room house for sale in 1928. The tract was purchased by the Round Top Museum owners in 1965 and was transferred along with the museum to the GNMP in 1971.

Round Top School

The one-room 1889 Round Top School was where the 1892 township citizens group formed to oppose the Gettysburg Electric Railway (cf. United States v. Gettysburg Electric Ry. Co.). The school closed in 1948, was sold in 1952, had renovations planned in 1972, and was deemed historically "not significant" in 2004.

== Visitor attractions ==
In addition to the 1884 Round Top Park and 1888 Round Top Museum (Little Round Top Hotel) with the adjacent Rosensteel Park, the community had two additional recreation groves:

Dr. Hudson's grove

"Dr. Hudson's grove" was a picnic area with a boxing arena and 1898 social hall that was established by veterinarian Edward Hudson. Hudson's new stable at Round Top had burned down in 1897, and in January 1900, a tavern license was refused for Hudson's hotel. On April 25, 1900, the Hudson property with the 60 ft × 30 ft (18.3 m × 9.1 m) Hotel Sedgwick and stable was next to the school and offered for sale by the Sheriff; and after being unable to sell the property by July 4, 1900; Hudson leased the grove in 1902 from the Gettysburg and Harrisburg Railway, and later offered his owned tract with "Store Room" for sale in 1905.

Cunningham Grove

Cunningham Grove east of Little Round Top was used for picnics as early as July 26, 1879. After the 1904 eminent domain jury for United States v. Five Tracts of land was formed regarding Reynolds Grove and a Round Top tract, the "tract of land belonging to Florence and Georgianna Cunningham" (different from the "Round Top Park property of [the] Gettysburg and Harrisburg Railroad") was transferred on September 18, 1905. In 1923, the funfair for the Adams County firemen's convention was held in the woods across from the Rosensteel pavilion with a "barker's alley" that included ten-pin stands, blanket and Kewpie doll wheels, knife and cane stands, and "Hit-the-Coon" games (2,000 cars were parked in 3 fields).

The community was the eponym for the Round Top hunting and economics clubs, and 20th-century retail businesses at Round Top included the 1904–1960 Epley Blacksmith Shop, the 1916 Round Top Fruit Farm, an early 20th-century automobile dealership (#940 Taneytown Road, site of a 1936 barn fire), the brick McGlaughlin general store (#770), and the 1950–1965 Shorty's Repair Shop on the Wheatfield Rd. A fast food concession built in 1962-3 remains on the southwest corner of the Wheatfield and Taneytown roads (#885), north of which is a 21st-century roadside produce stand (#855).
