= Wheatfield Road =

Highway in Pennsylvania, United States

Wheatfield
- Map of Adams County in southern Pennsylvania with Wheatfield Road highlighted in red

Route information
- Maintained by National Park Service
- Length: 1.2 mi (1.9 km)
- Time period: 1858 mapped by Howe; 1863 Battle of Gettysburg; 1895 Gettysburg National Military Park; 1933 National Park Service

Major junctions
- West end: US 15 Bus. (Emmitsburg Road)
- East end: PA 134 (Taneytown Road)

Location
- Country: United States
- State: Pennsylvania
- Counties: Adams

Highway system
- Scenic Byways; National; National Forest; BLM; NPS; Pennsylvania State Route System; Interstate; US; State; Scenic; Legislative

The Wheatfield Road is a Gettysburg Battlefield crossroad from the Peach Orchard east-southeastward along the north side of The Wheatfield (on the Peach Orchard-Devil's Den ridge), north of the Valley of Death, and over the north foot of Little Round Top. In addition to modern tourist use, the road is notable for Battle of Gettysburg use and postbellum trolley use associated with the 1892-1896 US v. Gettysburg Electric Ry. case of the US Supreme Court.

== Route description ==
Wheatfield Road begins at an intersection with US 15 Bus. within Gettysburg National Military Park in Cumberland Township, where the road continues west as Millerstown Road. From here, it heads east-southeast as a two-lane undivided road, heading through fields in the park. The road continues into wooded areas with some fields, passing to the north of Little Round Top. Wheatfield Road comes to an end at an intersection with PA 134 in the community of Round Top, where the road continues east as Blacksmith Shop Road to Baltimore Pike.

== History ==
During the Battle of Gettysburg, the dirt Wheatfield Road was used by various Union and Confederate troops (e.g., Crawford's Third Division of Pennsylvania Reserves), and Union troops deployed artillery westward to the Peach Orchard using the road. In 1884, the Round Top Branch's wye with double spurs and station was built at the east end of Wheatfield Road, and in 1894 the Gettysburg Electric Railway was laid along a west portion of the road (trolleys also crossed the east end near Round Top Station). In 1895, the Commonwealth of Pennsylvania ceded jurisdiction of Wheatfield Road to the War Department, and in 1900 two cast iron identification tablets were placed to label the road. The Gettysburg Electric Railway tracks were removed from the Wheatfield Road in 1917 and the road was repaired in 1931. The Wheatfield Road was resurfaced with asphalt west of Sykes Avenue in 1933, and completed "from the Rosensteel pavilion to the Taneytown road" in 1940 by the McMillan Woods Civilian Conservation Corps camp.

== Junction list ==
The entire route is in Adams County.

Location	mi	km	Destinations	Notes
Peach Orchard angle	0.0	0.0	US 15 Bus. (Emmitsburg Road)	Continues west to Willoughby Run via Millerstown Road
Gettysburg National Military Park			McGilvery Artillery Avenue	Southbound avenue
Gettysburg National Military Park	0.1	0.16	Sickles Avenue	Northbound avenue
Gettysburg National Military Park	0.21	0.34	Wheatfield Road's Sickles Avenue section "constructed" in 1899	
Gettysburg National Military Park	0.3	0.48	Sickles Avenue	Southboun avenue "across Wheatfield")
Gettysburg National Military Park	0.6	0.97	Ayres Avenue	Southboune avenue)
Gettysburg National Military Park			Plum Run bridge 39.7969°N 77.2390°W north of Valley of Death	
Gettysburg National Military Park	0.7	1.1	1898 Crawford Avenue	Crossroad
Gettysburg National Military Park	1.0	1.6	1897 Sedgwick Avenue and Sykes Avenue	Crossroad
Round Top	1.2	1.9	PA 134 (Taneytown Road)	Continues east to Baltimore Pike via Blacksmith Shop Road
1.000 mi = 1.609 km; 1.000 km = 0.621 mi
