= Oak Ridge, Adams County, Pennsylvania =

Landform on the Gettysburg Battlefield

Oak Ridge
- Location within Pennsylvania

Highest point
- Coordinates: 39.886722°N 77.23423°W

Geography
- Location: Pennsylvania, United States

Oak Ridge is the landform of the Gettysburg Battlefield where the Eternal Light Peace Memorial was dedicated by President Franklin D. Roosevelt during the 1938 Gettysburg reunion. After the July 1, 1863 Battle of Oak Ridge, Whitworth rifled cannon fired from the Confederate position on Oak Hill onto Culp's Hill and Cemetery Hill. The ridge has numerous Battle of Gettysburg monuments and the 1895 Oak Ridge Observation Tower. In the 1920s, the Gettysburg Airport was established in the west slope of the ridge.
