= The Peach Orchard =

Battlefield site in Pennsylvania, US

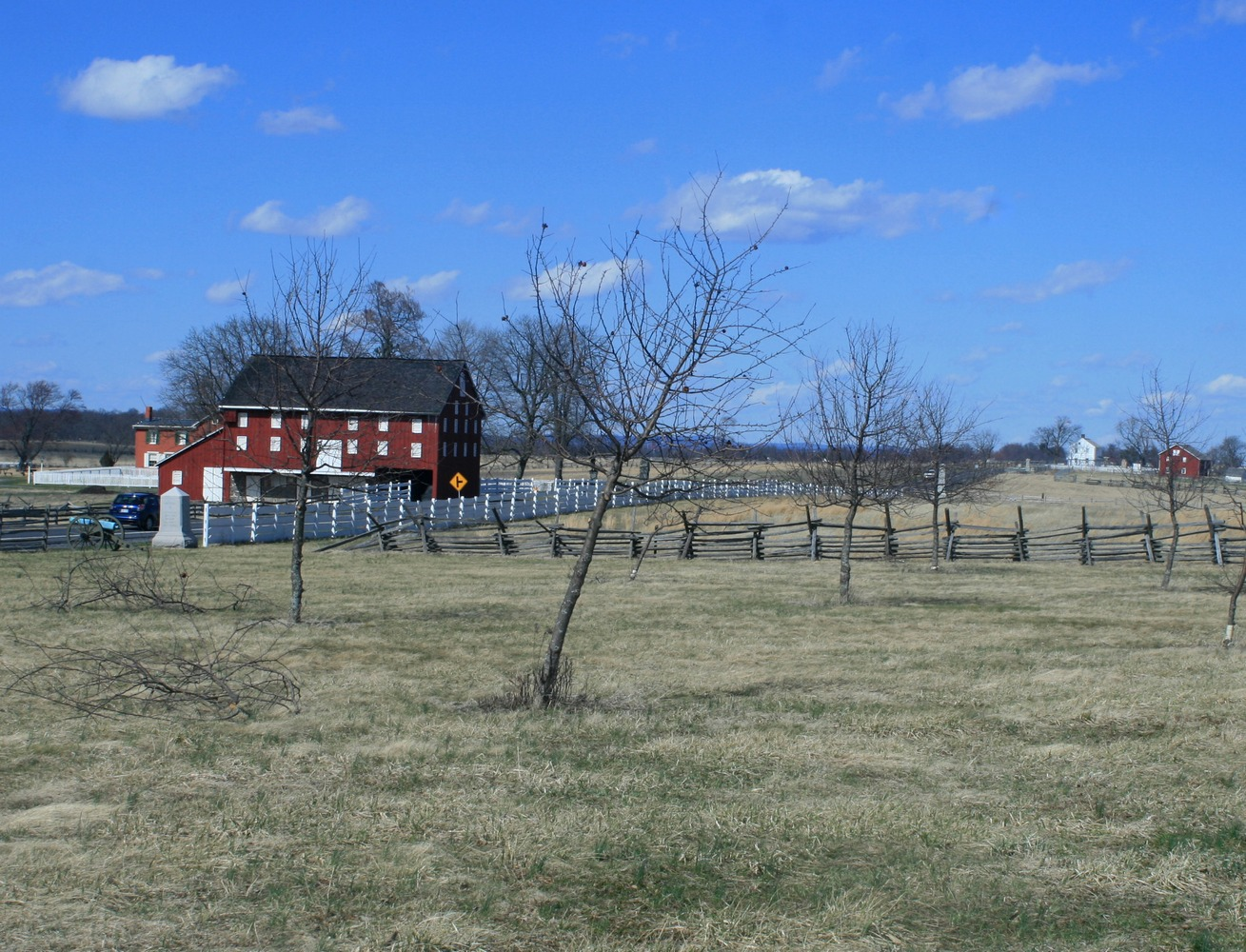
- Peach Orchard in 2015
- Interactive map of The Peach Orchard
- Location: Gettysburg Historic (75000155), Adams County, Pennsylvania, U.S.
- Coordinates: 39°48′03″N 77°14′59″W
- Width: 0 km (0 mi)
- Area: 0 acres (0 ha)
- Elevation: 624.8 ft (190.4 m)

External images
- battle artwork (stereograph)
- 3rd MI monument

The Peach Orchard is a Gettysburg Battlefield site at the southeast corner of the north-south Emmitsburg Road intersection with the Wheatfield Road. The orchard is demarcated on the east and south by Birney Avenue, which provides access to various memorials regarding the "momentous attacks and counterattacks in…the orchard on the afternoon of July 2, 1863."

== Geography ==
The Peach Orchard is on a hornfel along the northwest edge of the local geologic diabase sheet and at the "angle of the Peach Orchard" formed by the vertex of 2 low ridges: "one from Devil's Den, the other along the Emmitsburg road." The orchard drains southward into Rose Run, through Rose Woods, to Plum Run; and the orchard tract has a modern north-south embankment along the Emmitsburg road to the west of which a drainage depression separates the orchard from Warfield Ridge.

== History ==
By 1858 on the southeast corner of the crossroads, the Peach Orchard had been planted by Reverend Joseph Sherfy, who had a homestead to the north on the opposite (west) side of the Emmitsburg Road. On the Battle of Gettysburg, Second Day, the "Peach Orchard Salient" military position of the Army of the Potomac had been established from the "angle of the Peach Orchard" both northward along the Emmitsburg Rd and, for the "Wheatfield Road line", eastward. Union positions in the orchard prior to the July 2 military engagements included the 68th Pennsylvania Infantry on the west side at the south point of Graham's Emmitsburg Rd line, the 3rd Maine Volunteer Infantry Regiment on the orchard's south (downhill) side near the Emmitsburg Rd, and on the north side of the orchard along the south side of the east-west road, Thompson's cannons and, closer to the Emmitsburg Rd, Ames' cannons. "It was three o'clock before [Confederate] Colonel Alexander, of Longstreet's corps, had his batteries unlimbered in the edge of the woods west and south of the peach orchard."

=== Military engagements ===
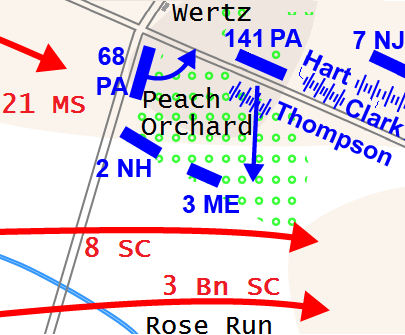
The Peach Orchard Union positions (blue) included Pennsylvania light artillery (six cannons) (e.g., Hampton's Battery F and Hart's 15th NY Light Battery.)

Peach Orchard combat began with Union artillery in the orchard counterfiring on Alexander's batteries which reduced Ames' supply of Union cannon ammunition. When Hood's Assault advanced eastward over the Emmitsburg Rd and across the slope south of the orchard, "Ames had all of his spherical case [ammunition] carried to his left section, Lt. James B. Hazelton's," to fire on the infantry, while Ames' "center and right sections continued their counterbattery fire with shot." With the Confederate left flank to the south exposed to the orchard's Union forces, the cannon and infantry in the "Peach Orchard were able to rake Kershaw's lines severely". As Union officer Watson's guns fired a last volley of canister at the Carolinians, the 2nd New Hampshire Volunteer Infantry advanced southward into "the Peach Orchard to save the [Watson] guns…crowding between the limbers and guns, reformed, and emerged at the orchard's southwest corner, its right extending to the Emmitsburg Road." "The Second opened fire on the South Carolinians in its front, the Second Battalion [sic] (Note: There was no Second Battalion from South Carolina present at Gettysburg, instead the 3rd South Carolina Infantry Battalion fought alongside the 8th South Carolina Infantry Regiment in Kershaw's Brigade; see Battle of Gettysburg order of battle: Confederate) and the Eighth Regiment. The South Carolinians…fell back to the bottom of the slope 150 or so yards from the orchard's edge. Bailey then shifted the Second's line to the rear of some fence rails that were piled along the side of the orchard where a fence had been."

At the 6 p.m. start of McLaws' Assault, Barksdale's and Wofford's Confederate brigades charged from the west directly into the Peach Orchard. Graham's Union brigade, with the 3rd ME & 3rd MI, "held the peach orchard until nearly dusk"; and at "6:30 p.m., McLaws' Division [broke] Birney's line at the Peach Orchard". The 21st Mississippi Infantry Regiment passed through the Peach Orchard toward Bigelow's 9th Massachusetts Battery farther east, also outflanking the 2nd New Hampshire, threatening it to be cut off from the rest of the Union, forcing them to retreat.

The 2nd NH entered the Battle of Gettysburg with 353 soldiers. In under three hours, 47 were killed, 136 wounded and 36 men went missing; of the 24 officers, only three were not killed or wounded.

=== Postbellum ===
Franklin Dullin Briscoe's artwork, Peach Orchard – Gettysburg, is now in the National Archives; and the Gettysburg Battlefield Memorial Association board approved purchase of the orchard in 1890 (several Peach Orchard memorials were erected during the memorial association era--e.g., 68th Pennsylvania Infantry in 1886). Battlefield landscape preservation began in 1883 when peach trees were replanted in the orchard, and in 1896 a cast iron site identification marker was added near the road intersection. The orchard was deeded to the War Department in 1906, was replanted in 1909, and exhibited 6 "Army of the Potomac" cannon by 1912. The land bordering the orchard to the east and south was purchased from J. Emory Bair in 1907, and Birney Avenue of 900 ft (270 m) on those 2 sides was piked in 1914. The Camp Eisenhower YCC participants replaced the orchard's peach trees in 1974, the orchard's ID tablet by Emmor Cope was entered-documented as an historic district contributing structure in 2004, and the orchard was replanted in April 2008.
