= Round Top Branch =

Round Top Extension
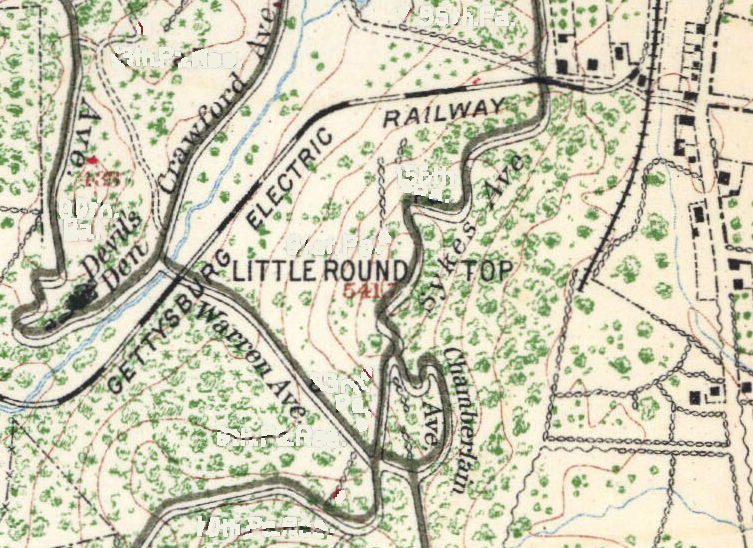
- The Round Top Branch terminus (right, north-to-south) was south of Round Top, Pennsylvania and east of the Little Round Top summit.

Overview
- Locale: Adams County, Pennsylvania, US
- Dates of operation: 1884–

Technical
- Length: 2.798 mi (4.503 km)

The Round Top Branch was an extension of the Gettysburg and Harrisburg Railroad from the Gettysburg borough across the Gettysburg Battlefield to Round Top, Pennsylvania. The branch ran southward from the terminus of the railroad's main line (its junction with the Hanover Junction, Hanover and Gettysburg Railroad north of Meade School), west of the school and St. Francis Xavier Cemetery, across the field of Pickett's Charge, south of Cemetery Ridge, east of Weikert Hill and Munshower Knoll, and through Round Top to a point between Little Round Top's east base and Taneytown Road. In addition to battlefield tourists, the line carried stone monoliths and statues for monuments during the battlefield's memorial association and commemorative eras and equipment, supplies and participants for Gettysburg Battlefield camps after the American Civil War (e.g., the 1884 Camp Gettysburg, 1913 Gettysburg reunion, 1918 Camp Colt and 1938 Gettysburg reunion).

== History ==
After completion of a 22 mi (35 km) initial survey of Gettysburg along Rock Creek on January 12, 1882, the Gettysburg and Harrisburg Rail Road main line was instead completed into the borough along Oak Ridge with nine stations from Hunter's Run. By July 14, 1882, Ambrose E. Lehman of the State Geological Survey completed the G&HRR survey for the branch to Round Top, and the HJ,H&GRR (successor to the G&HRR) survey was begun by engineer Joseph S. Gitt for a competing Round-Top Railroad Company route to Round Top; the latter was never built.

Track workers under foreman Coulson were laying rails of 80 lb (36 kg) per yard for the branch in May 1884, and laborer "Blind Davy" Weikert was blinded by a premature dynamite blast. The Round Top Station's warehouse was completed June 21, 1884. After being surveyed in May, the branch's connection to the HJ, H&GRR was being completed on July 22, 1884 "just beyond the Cashman limestone kilns" and a siding along Fairfield Road had been completed along with a switch at the PA National Guard commissary (the 1913 siding held eight carloads of ice). The "dummy" Baldwin steam engine had begun excursions "to the hill" in June 1884 and could carry about 40 passengers (the branch's "dinky" could carry about 10). The G&HRR published a Gettysburg Battlefield guidebook with 1884 images by "the great landscape photographer, Mr. Bell, of Philadelphia".

By 1888 the branch's Hancock Station on the battlefield was south of The Angle near the Vermont and Tammany monuments, and on a c. 1900 map, a wye with crossing double spurs was depicted at Round Top Station with a benchmark at 545 ft (166 m) elevation; by 1904, the wye was no longer depicted. In 1902, Camp Lawton was headquartered at The Angle with its telegraph and telephone office at the Emmitsburg Rd "junction of the steam and electric roads near the Codori buildings". Through October 1914, a combination arsenal and commissary along the Round Top Branch was used for Pennsylvania National Guard camps at Gettysburg. A special platform on the branch was built for 1913 Gettysburg reunion veterans to disembark directly into their camp on the west side of Emmitsburg Road; after addressing the veterans, President Woodrow Wilson departed the Great Camp in his private rail car via the branch.

The branch's junction was visible on a June 25 aerial photo of the 1938 Gettysburg reunion camp; on May 7, 1939 a Reading Railroad train from Philadelphia carried 400 excursionists on the branch to Round Top. Except for special occasions (such as a trip by Bethlehem students in 1958), Reading passenger service to Gettysburg ceased in 1941 and an application to abandon the Round Top Branch was made in 1942 (the rails were removed and a few artifacts remain in place). The main-line junction is now located at Seminary Ridge west of the original 19th century junction, and was used by the Gettysburg Railroad (1976–1996) and the 1996-2001 Gettysburg Railway.

== Route ==
External image
- crossing of gravel Hancock Av

Route (north-to-south) This list is incomplete; you can help by editing it.
Intersections & curves	Coordinates
Junction	39.832606°N 77.237733°W
Switch to turntable	For three-engine roundhouse
Wye switch	Behind Meade School
Stevens Run (three crossings, one in borough)	39.82937°N 77.238801°W 39.822214°N 77.242336°W; 39.821903°N 77.242244°W
Emmitsburg Road	39.812805°N 77.23923°W
Hancock Station	
Slight bend	39.804308°N 77.235169°W
Hancock Ave	39.803442°N 77.234445°W
United States Ave	39.80242°N 77.233758°W
Curve east of Weikert Hill	39.796997°N 77.231886°W
Round Top Station	
Wheatfield Rd	
Terminus	Between ends of two rock walls

== See also ==
- Round Top visitor attractions
