= The Angle =

Area of the Gettysburg battlefield in the US civil war

The Angle Bloody Angle
- Historic site
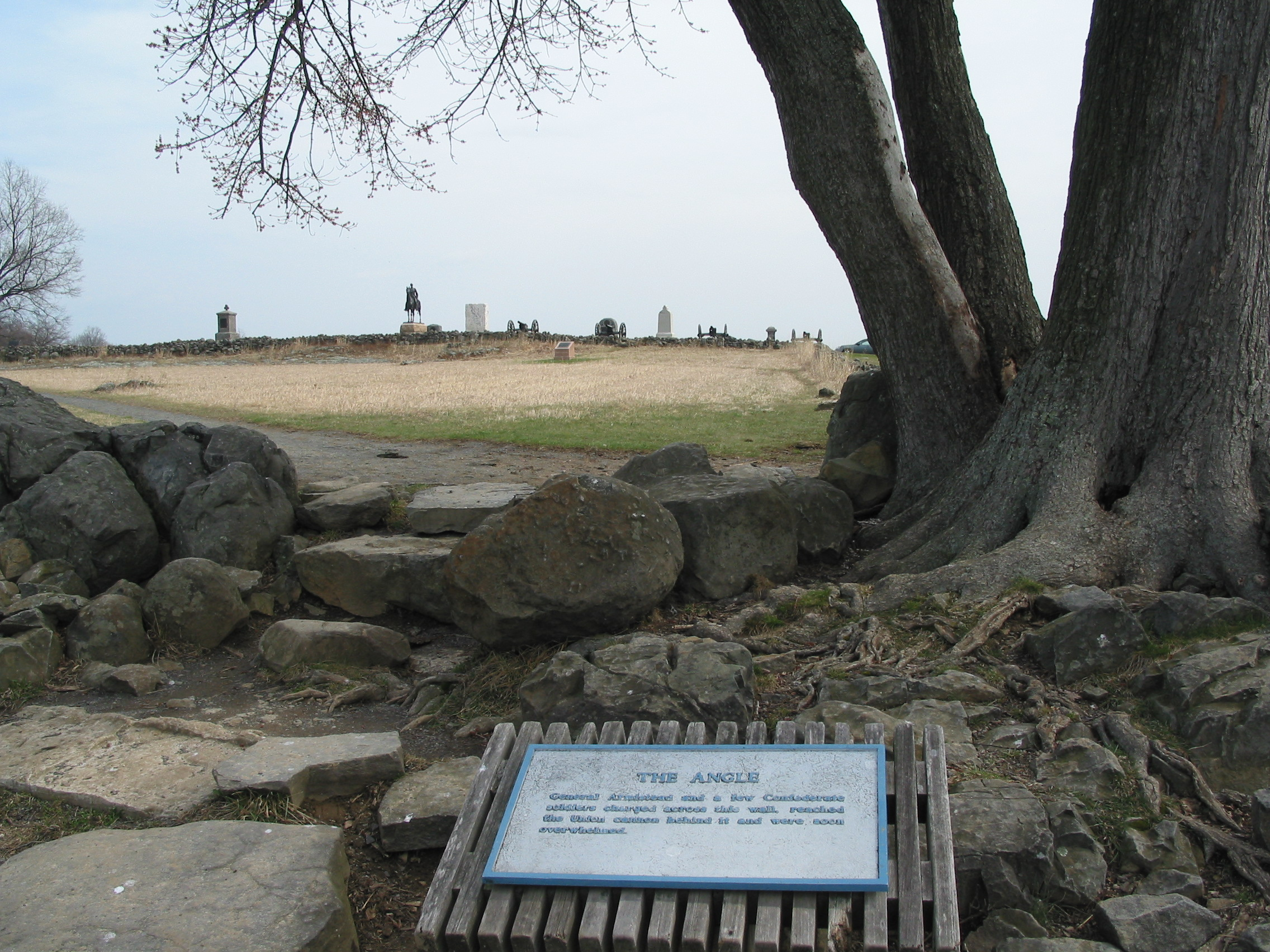
- Plaque inscribed "General Armistead and a few Confederate soldiers charged across this wall, reached the Union cannon behind it and were soon overwhelmed"
- Interactive map of The Angle
- Coordinates: 39°48′48″N 77°14′11″W
- Location: plaque near north end of north-south wall & west end of 80 ft west-east wall

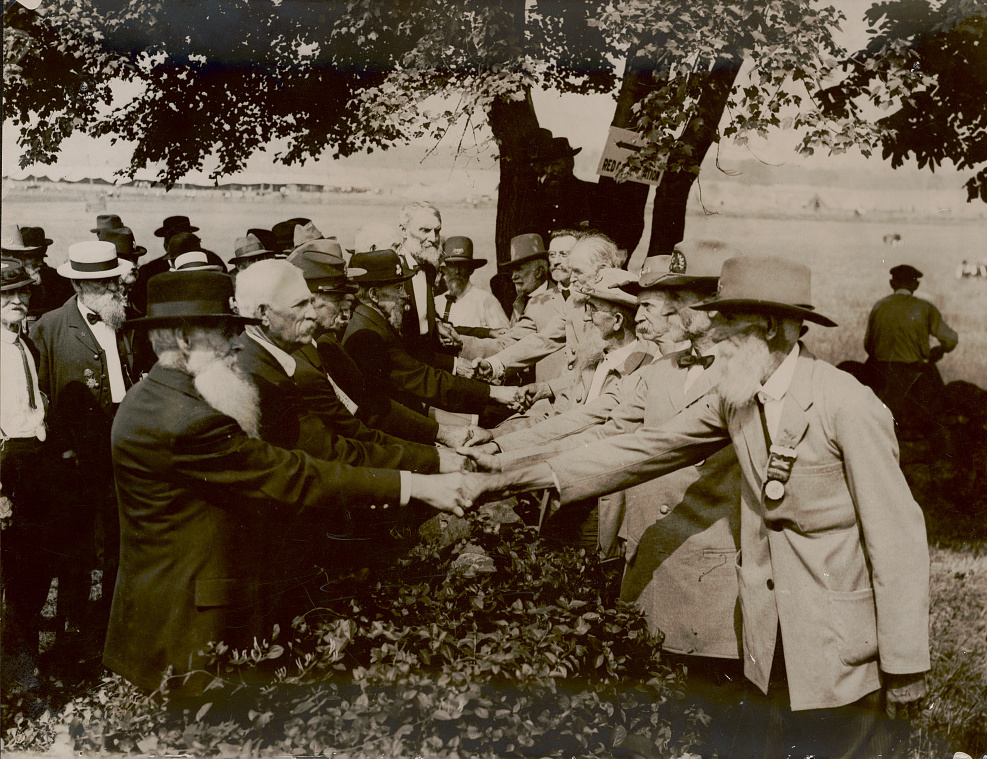
Old veterans clasping hands across the Angle at the 1913 Gettysburg reunion.

The Angle (Bloody Angle colloq.) is a Gettysburg Battlefield area which includes the 1863 Copse of Trees used as the target landmark for Pickett's Charge, the 1892 monument that marks the high-water mark of the Confederacy, a rock wall, and several other Battle of Gettysburg monuments.

== History ==
The area is where approximately 1,500 Confederate Virginians broke through the July 3, 1863, Union line on Cemetery Ridge, and in 1922, the Marine Expeditionary Force of Camp Harding used The Angle in their reenactment of Pickett's Charge. The proper noun "Bloody Angle" became common during the battlefield's commemorative era after being used as early as 1893.

A copy of the Gettysburg Cyclorama was displayed in an 1894 tent at The Angle, and during reunions in 1887, 1913 (50th battle anniversary), and 1938 (75th); battle veterans shook hands over the rock wall at The Angle. The nearby field along the Emmitsburg Road was also the site of Gettysburg Battlefield camps after the American Civil War such as Eisenhower's 1918 Camp Colt, the 1938 Army Camp with the Secretary of War's quarters, and a World War II POW stockade.

The Angle is one of the few places named after the battle that is not named for a person (cf. The Loop). As with Hancock Avenue along the east wall that extends northward, the original route planned for the 1893 Gettysburg Electric Railway was along the west wall of The Angle that extends southward, and although the trolley line was moved along the Emmitsburg Road, the Gettysburg National Military Park did not acquire the trolley land at The Angle until congressional funding was appropriated in 1917.

== See also ==
- List of monuments of the Gettysburg Battlefield
