= 1913 Gettysburg reunion =

American Civil War veterans reunion

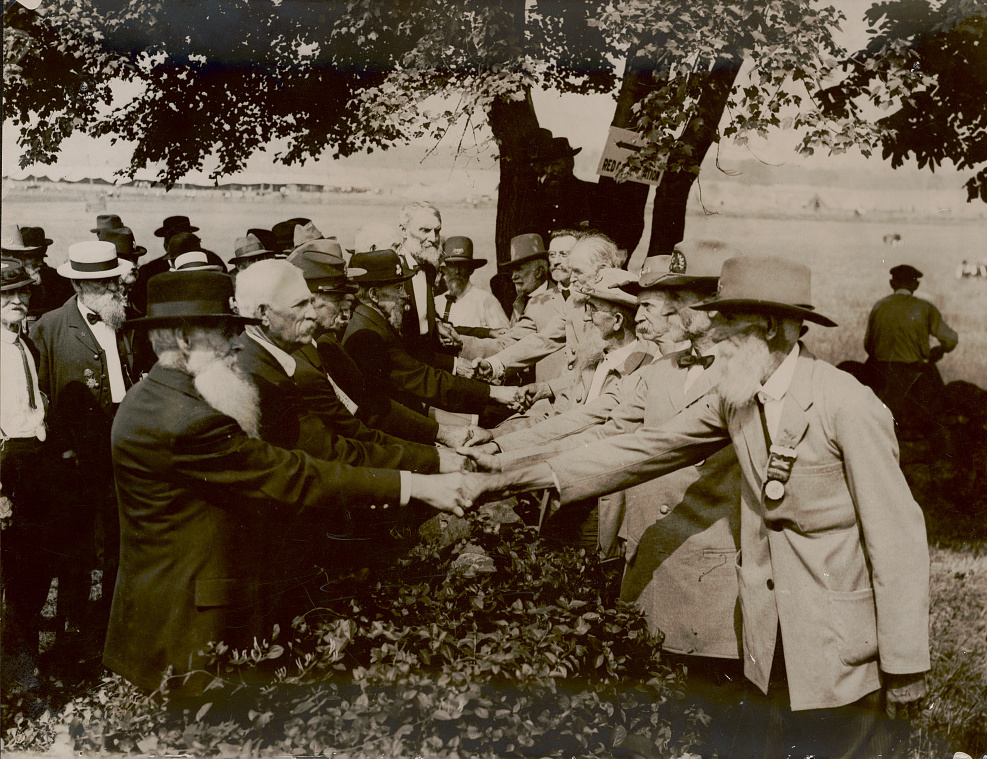
- Old soldiers of the North and South clasping hands over The Angle in fraternal affection

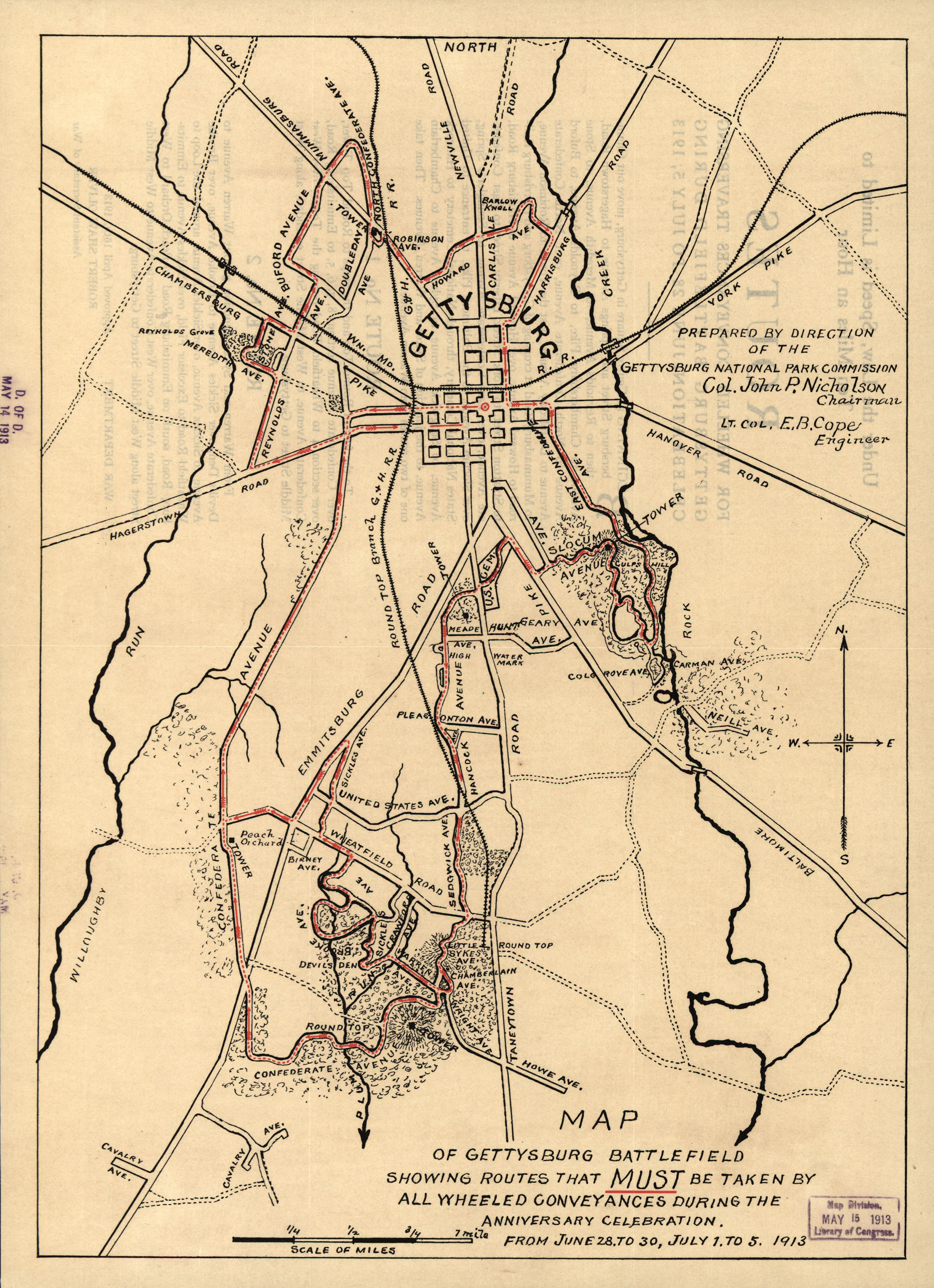
- Gettysburg battlefield during the anniversary celebration
- Location: Gettysburg National Military Park, Adams County, Pennsylvania in United States
- Website: United States Department of War

The 1913 Gettysburg reunion was a Gettysburg Battlefield encampment of American Civil War veterans for the Battle of Gettysburg's 50th anniversary. The June 29 – July 4 gathering of 53,407 veterans (about 8,750 Confederate) was the largest Civil War veteran reunion. All honorably-discharged veterans in the Grand Army of the Republic and the United Confederate Veterans were invited, and veterans from 46 of the 48 states attended (all except Nevada and Wyoming).

Despite official concerns "that there might be unpleasant differences, at least, between the blue and gray" (as after England's War of the Roses and the French Revolution), the peaceful reunion was characterized by instances of Union–Confederate camaraderie. President Woodrow Wilson's July 4 reunion address summarized the spirit: "We have found one another again as brothers and comrades in arms, enemies no longer, generous friends rather, our battles long past, the quarrel forgotten—except that we shall not forget the splendid valor."

== Planning ==
After a number of smaller Gettysburg reunions, including the 1906 Philadelphia Brigade-Pickett's Division reunion during which Brigadier General Lewis Armistead's captured sword was returned to the South, in April 1908 General Henry S. Huidekoper of Philadelphia suggested a 1913 50th anniversary reunion to Pennsylvania Governor Edwin Sydney Stuart. On September 8, the Gettysburg National Park Commission met with Gettysburg borough officials about the event. Stuart held a sub-committee meeting on October 25, and addressed the General Assembly about the matter in January 1909.

On May 13, 1909, the Pennsylvania Assembly created the Fiftieth Anniversary of the Battle of Gettysburg Commission. The commission's "first tentative programme" of October 13, 1910 included a "Peace Jubilee", with a noon July 3 placement of the cornerstone for a "Great Peace Memorial". The August 26, 1912, US Congress bill appropriated $150,000 and directed the War Department to establish the camp. Because the memorial funding was not approved, the Peace Jubilee plans were removed from the schedule.

The site of the camp and the 8 acres (3.2 ha) for the Great Tent, west of the Codori House, were selected in 1912 and mapped by the Gettysburg National Park Commission. The commission also painted avenue fencing, gun carriages, iron tablets, pyramids, and shells from 1912 through June 30, 1913. On April 13, 1913, the Pennsylvania commission completed the Pennsylvania State Memorial and mailed invitations to 40,000 veterans. On June 28, President Woodrow Wilson notified the Pennsylvania commission that he would attend the reunion for a "very limited period". The 33 contributing states provided a total of $1,033,000 for the reunion, with $450,000 coming from Pennsylvania.

The Pennsylvania commission headquarters at Gettysburg was at 231 Baltimore Street, with the Harrisburg office of the Secretary (later nicknamed the "Duke of Gettysburg") in Pennsylvania State Capitol's Room 509. Commemorative tokens and programs were designed for attendees, including three types of Pennsylvania badges ("Press", "Guest", and "Scout"), a commemorative medal, and a souvenir program of poems by attending "Veteran Scout" Jack Crawford. The Pennsylvania Railroad added "a telephone line between Gettysburg and Hanover along the Western Maryland Railway, over which the Pennsy [would] operate a large number of trains during the battle anniversary". On the Chambersburg-Gettysburg turnpike and the Gettysburg-Petersburg turnpike, tolls ended for the reunion. The Pennsylvania Supreme Court upheld the 1911 Sproul Roads Act on June 27, enabling the Commonwealth to acquire private toll roads and make them free for the public.

Water wells were being drilled for the July encampment by February 1, 1913, and hotels in Hanover, Chambersburg, Hagerstown, and "the Blue Ridge section [were] filling rapidly" by June 26. For entertainment, a Gettysburg facility was established in 1912 to display the Boston version of the Gettysburg Cyclorama and the Encyclopedia of the American Civil War: A Political, Social, and Military History; The Battle of Gettysburg, a now-lost film, first played at Walter's Theatre on June 26. Local planning for the reunion included expanding the Gettysburg hackman tax to automobiles (upheld by the Pennsylvania Supreme Court in 1914), a 50-cent maximum for taxi fares in the borough, and a request from a few Missouri veterans for "a few good widows or old maids ... good housekeepers and not too young" to go west after the reunion. (The "kind-hearted mayor", J. A. Holtzworth, agreed to forward photos to the veterans in the "Cupid ... operations".)

== Facilities ==
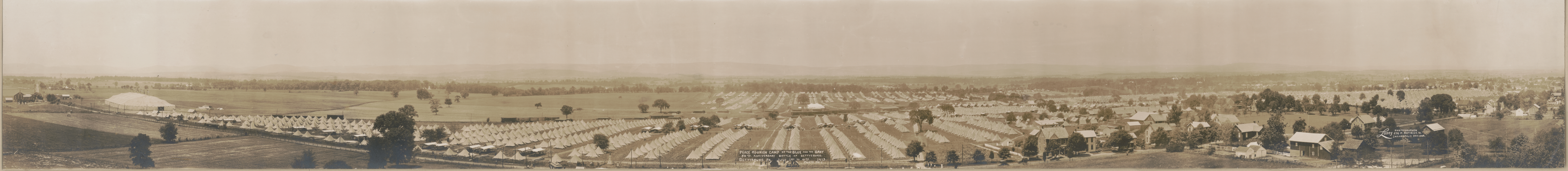
Panorama of the Great Camp on the Gettysburg Battlefield

The War Department's Great Camp (Gettysburg Encampment, Anniversary Camp, or Veterans Camp) provided tents and support facilities for the Civil War veterans and extended from both sides of Long Lane on the north to within 500 yd (460 m) of the Bliss House. The Great Camp included the Great Tent (Big Tent, measuring 200 ft × 450 ft [61 m × 137 m]) "with its thirteen thousand chairs"; the veterans' tents; quarters for 1,466 War Department soldiers (including camp commander General Liggitt) and 2,179 mess personnel; 385 camp Boy Scouts from Washington, and other camp personnel for a total of 57,198 "persons quartered and subsisted in the Great Camp". The camp had a temporary U. S. Post Office; 90 Pennsylvania Health Department latrines throughout the camp, with a seating capacity of 3,476; and (near the Great Tent) an emergency station and two health-department Comfort Houses which supplied the Great Tent water fountains. The Pennsylvania commission set up a temporary morgue in the camp. A special platform on the Round Top Branch was built for veterans to disembark from steam trains into the camp; in February, trolleys of the Gettysburg Electric Railway had been prohibited from using the branch.

After the state health department's chief engineer estimated that Gettysburg (with a population of 4,500) would be inundated with 100,000 people, the borough accepted the commissioner of health's request for his department to take over medical and sanitation efforts in the area from June 25 to July 25. The department set up a field hospital on the Kurtz property facing Brickyard Lane on the north foot of East Cemetery Hill and six comfort stations in the borough: one at each railroad station. The department tested borough wells and mitigated contamination sources upstream from the water-works supply on Marsh Creek. The American Red Cross Society and 72 additional Boy Scouts operated fourteen 7 ft × 7 ft (2.1 m × 2.1 m) relief stations for first aid and rest on the battlefield-park roads. Gettysburg's Tuberculosis Dispensary was also used as a relief station.

Attached to the Great Camp were a battery of the Third United States Field Artillery and several companies of regular infantry. Companies A-D (14 officers and 285 men) of the Fifteenth United States Cavalry arrived on June 26 to guard the battlefield, camping west of Seminary Ridge on the Hagerstown Road. A "model Camp" for a Pennsylvania cavalry squadron was on the "College Athletic Field" adjoining the commission's headquarters. A total of 527 people were quartered at the Lutheran Theological Seminary at Gettysburg and Pennsylvania College (renamed Gettysburg College in 1921), including the Pennsylvania Gettysburg Commission, four troops of the Pennsylvania State Police, and (in tents) Governor Tener's staff. Additional nearby encampments included the leased Newspaper Row ("Meadeboro") for 155 journalists north of Gettysburg National Cemetery, an encampment of 30 Boy Scouts near Cashtown (west of Gettysburg) for traveler services on the Chambersburg-Gettysburg Pike, and Philadelphia and Baltimore Salvation Army members encamped at Stonesifer's Grove in Biglerville.

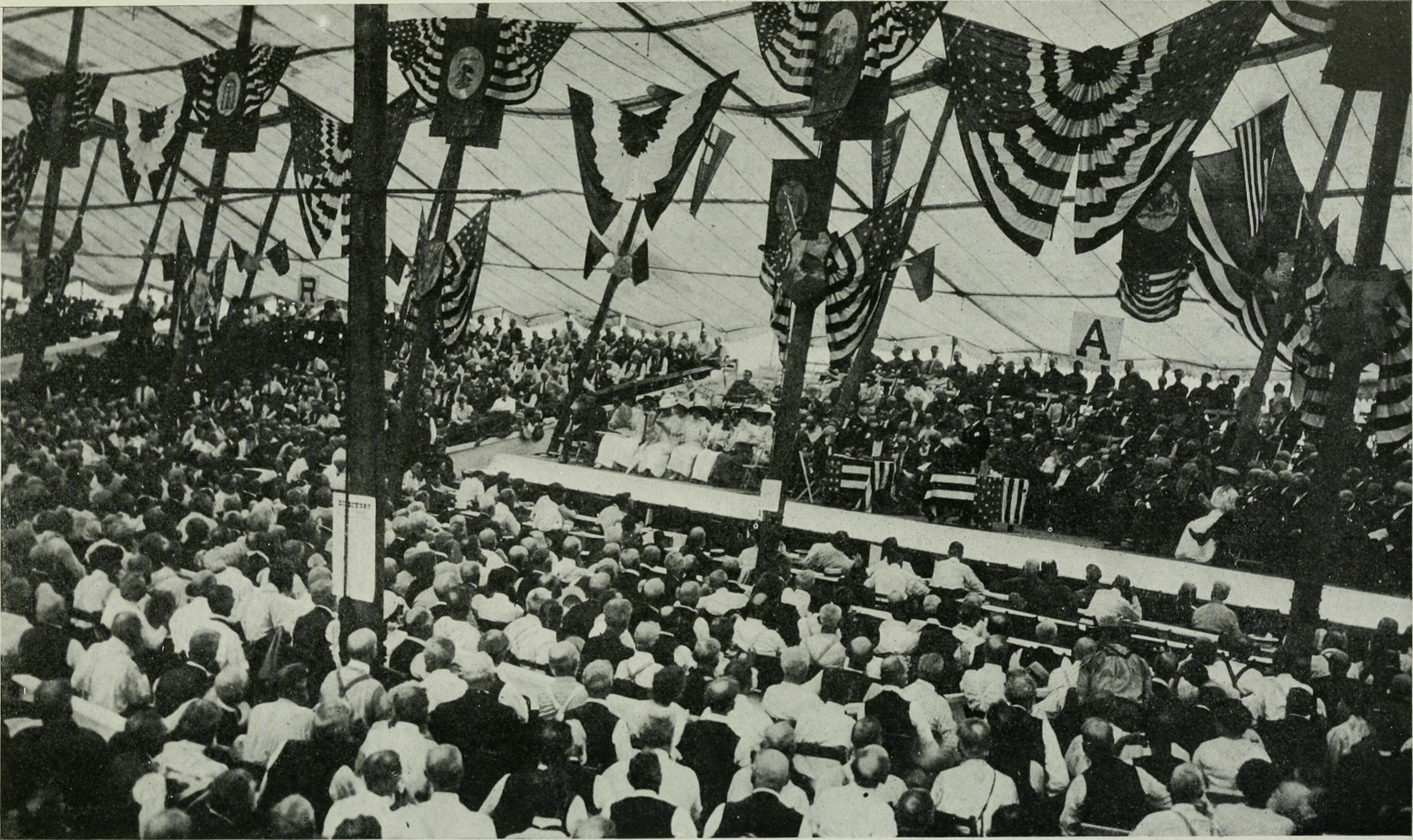
Secretary of War Lindley M. Garrison addresses the audience in the Great Tent

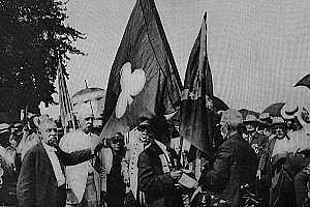
For the Webb-Pickett flag ceremony, two 1863 units advanced about 50 ft (15 m)—Union from the north, Confederate from the south—to flags at the Angle stone wall, where they "clasped hands and buried their faces on each other's shoulders".

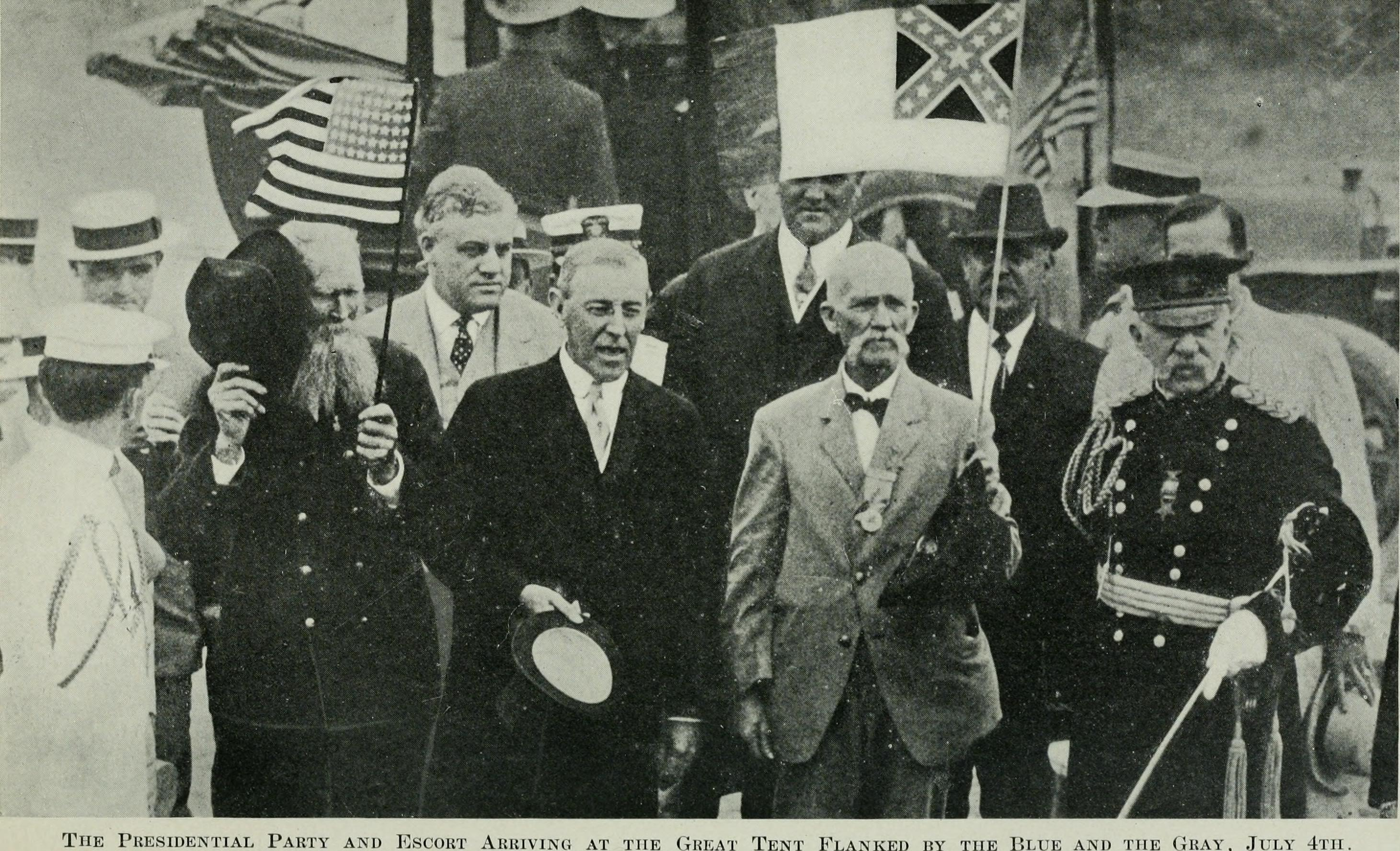
President Woodrow Wilson with veterans

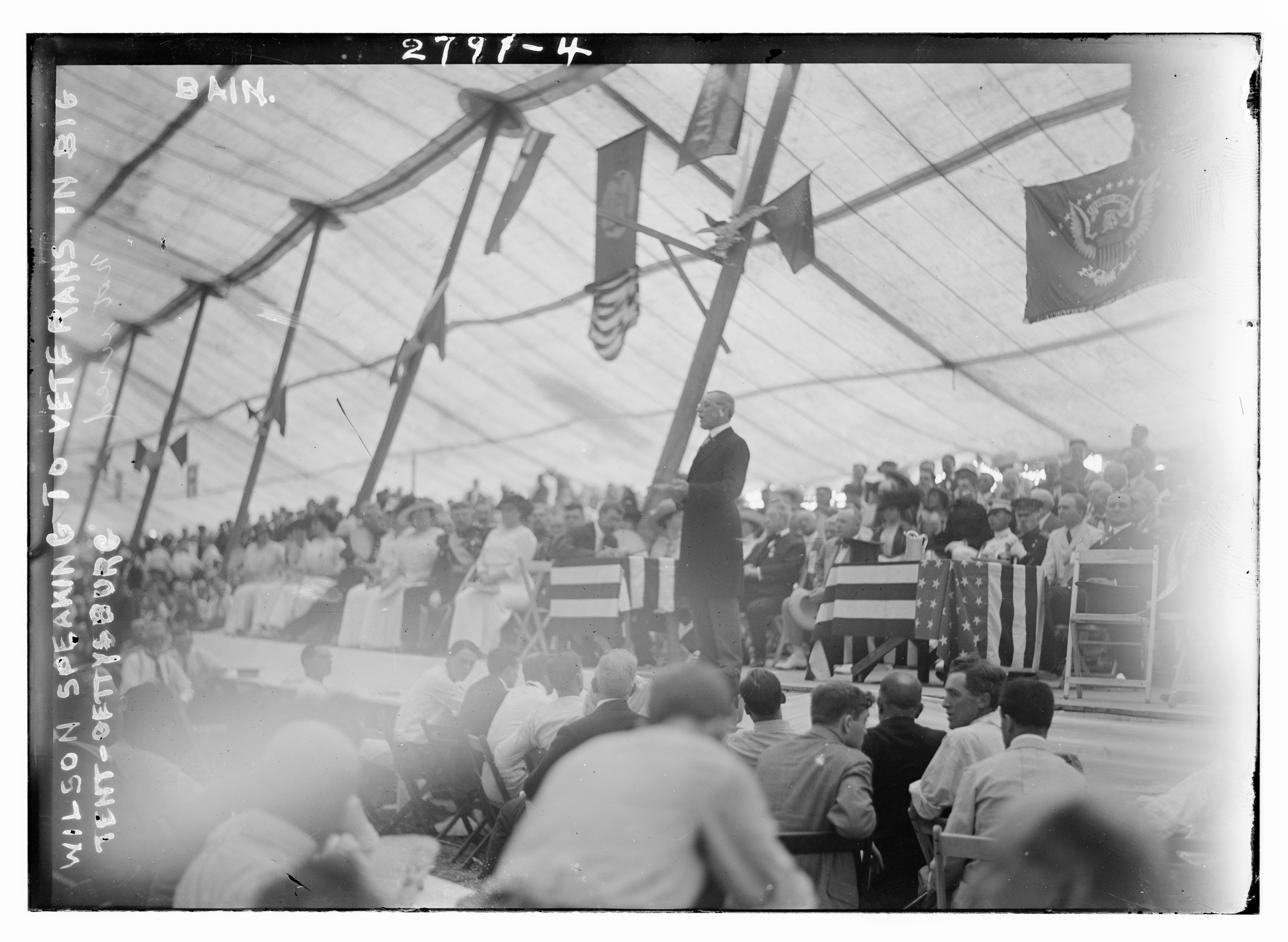
Woodrow Wilson speaking to veterans in the Great Tent

== Events ==
The commission planned a four-day series of events, with each day dedicated to a different group. Anticipating that some veterans might arrive early (especially those traveling a long distance), the Great Camp was opened for supper on June 29. Pennsylvania veterans who attended the state reunion, which adjourned on June 28, made up most of the over 21,000 arrivals that day. Other veterans arriving early included two Confederate veterans of Culp's Hill, who arrived on June 26. Captain McCaskey of the Quartermasters Corps had estimated that 6,000 men might arrive on June 29, and temporarily struggled with shortages of food and supplies. Some veterans left without staying another night. On June 30, the 1912 base of the Virginia Monument was dedicated; the rest of the monument was completed later.

July 1: Veterans' Day
Included a speech by department-store developer and philanthropist John Wanamaker of Philadelphia.
July 2: Military Day
Included an address by an officer recommending a stronger military during this period of increasing tensions in Europe, a reading of the Gettysburg Address, and a review of the Virginia division at Seminary Ridge by their governor. At night, a "Union raid" on the Confederate side of the Great Camp was followed by joint parades and campfires.
July 3: Civic/Governors' Day
Sixty-five unit reunions, dedication of the General William Wells statue, and a Webb-Pickett flag ceremony at the Bloody Angle at the hour of Pickett's Charge. Vice President Thomas R. Marshall and his wife; Speaker of the House Champ Clark; eight senators, and 21 congressmen were among the officials who arrived that day. In the Great Tent from 4:30–6 p.m. was the New York Veterans' Celebration, which included a speech by Colonel Andrew Cowan, in which he again proposed a Gettysburg peace memorial. The fireworks by the Pain Fireworks Display Company at 9 p.m. included "gigantic set pieces covering the entire face and crest of Little Round Top".
July 4: National Day
Dedication of the Pennsylvania State Memorial; eight statues had been installed in April. President Woodrow Wilson arrived at 11 a.m. in a special rail car, traveled through the borough, and entered the Great Tent through two rows of Boy Scouts. He addressed the audience in the Big Tent about national unity, and left the camp after the National Anthem was played. Attendees returned to their quarters.
At noon, a five-minute tribute was held in silence for "Our Heroic Dead"; people throughout the area stood at attention, including at the "College Hotel" and "Seminary Hotel". The tribute began with a bugle salute while the Gettysburg bells in the distance tolled. The remaining minutes of silence were punctuated by periodic artillery firing in the distance. From 5 a.m. to 11 p.m., 7,147 automobiles used the national-park roads as visitors departed.

About 12,000 veterans had already left on July 2, and about the same number on July 3. During the evening of July 2 at the Hotel Gettysburg. W. B. Henry (a Southerner living in Philadelphia) uttered a "vile epithet" about President Abraham Lincoln and caused an argument at his table. A Union man threw his drink at Henry, who stabbed and slashed men at the table and on his way out to the street before he was apprehended. The Virginia governor spoke to officials on behalf of Henry, and his father (a Confederate major) posted bail for his son. The victims (all but one of whom were taken to a hospital) were all expected to recover, and most were released from the hospital the next day.

Dismantling of the Great Camp began immediately after the July 4 tribute. The hospital closed on July 5, and the last veteran left on July 8. The annual military instructional camp (250 college students) used several tents in the veterans' camp at the "Meadeboro" camp (Newspaper Row) from July 7 to August 15. The quartermaster headquarters on Baltimore Street closed on August 13, and by August 15 the Grand Camp had been removed except for "four great water storage reservoirs". A film, United at Gettysburg, documented the reunion and was shown at local theaters. Lt. Col. Lewis E. Beitler, Secretary of the Commission, finished compiling the organizations' reports on December 31, 1913. To commemorate the reunion, a colonial portico was opened in May 1914 at the seminary's Old Dorm; only the concrete base remains.

Reunion names in the official report

The Congressional committee used the name "Celebration of the Fiftieth Anniversary of the Battle of Gettysburg", but other organizations and officials used numerous other names:
· Celebration of the Semi-Centenary of the Civil War
· Gettysburg Celebration · Reunion Celebration at Gettysburg
· Gettysburg Reunion · Gettysburg Peace Reunion
· Great Peace Reunion · Great Peace Jubilee · Golden Jubilee
· Great Reunion · Grand Reunion · Blue and Gray Reunion
and, in a souvenir program of poems, Grand Reunion of the Blue and the Gray on the Fiftieth Anniversary of the Battle of Gettysburg.

== See also ==
- Commemoration of the American Civil War § Reenactments
- Historical reenactment
