= Gettysburg Electric Railway =

Borough trolley serving Gettysburg Battlefield attractions

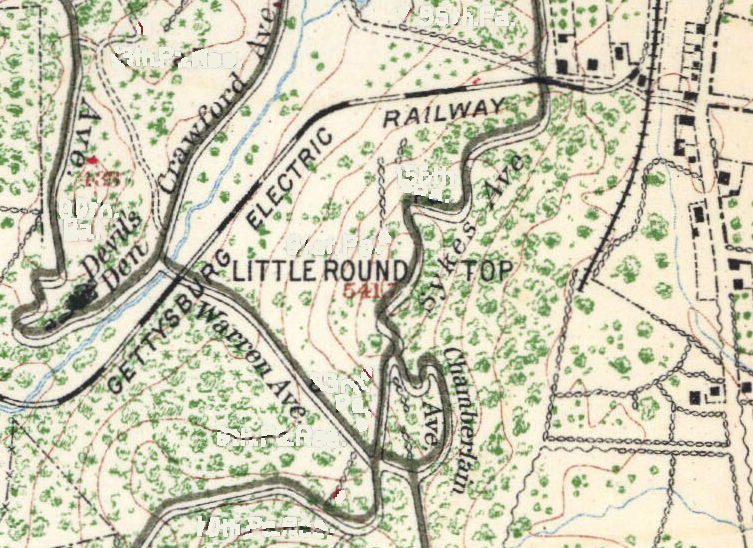
- The trolley line east of Plum Run extended to Round Top, Pennsylvania, through the Slaughter Pen, across Warren Av, through the Valley of Death, and across the north foot of Little Round Top to end behind the Round Top Station's warehouse.

Overview
- Locale: Adams County, Pennsylvania; Powerhouse: Gettysburg; Terminus: Round Top
- Operators: 1891: Gettysburg Electric Ry Co; 1895: receivership; 1897: Gettysburg Transit Co; 1909: Central Trust and Savings Co. & Railway Building and Operating Co.; 1910: Gettysburg Railway Co
- Dates of operation: 1894 (circaJuly) – 1916 November 16

External images
- c. 1908 summer ("Howard") & winter cars
- cars near the cemetery entrance & The Loop

The Gettysburg Electric Railway was a borough trolley that provided summer access to Gettysburg Battlefield visitor attractions such as military engagement areas, monuments, postbellum camps, and recreation areas (e.g., Wheat-field Park and the Pfeffer baseball diamond). Despite the 1896 Supreme Court ruling under the Takings Clause against the railway, battlefield operations continued until 1916. The trolley generating plant was leased by the Electric Light, Heat, and Power Company of Gettysburg to supply streetlights and homes until electricity was imported from Hanover.

The 94-passenger, 14-bench "Brill double-truck summer cars" used the main line of 5.7 mi (9.2 km) on 10-minute intervals and were powered by a 150 ft × 100 ft (46 m × 30 m) electric plant with 150 hp (110 kW) Corliss steam engine(s) driving 500 volt Westinghouse railway generator(s). Employees included superintendent Hal J. Gintling, managers Thomas P. Turner & Harry Cunningham; crewmen Charles W Culp Jr, Mr. Grinder, William Shields, George Hughes, Norman Murray, Reuben Rupp, Walter Plank, Harry Robinson; conductors John Thomas, William G. Weaver, & Edward Weikert; and motormen Warfield Collins, Mr. Emmons, Gervus W. Myers, Arthur "Ott" Shields, & S. A. Troxell.

== History ==
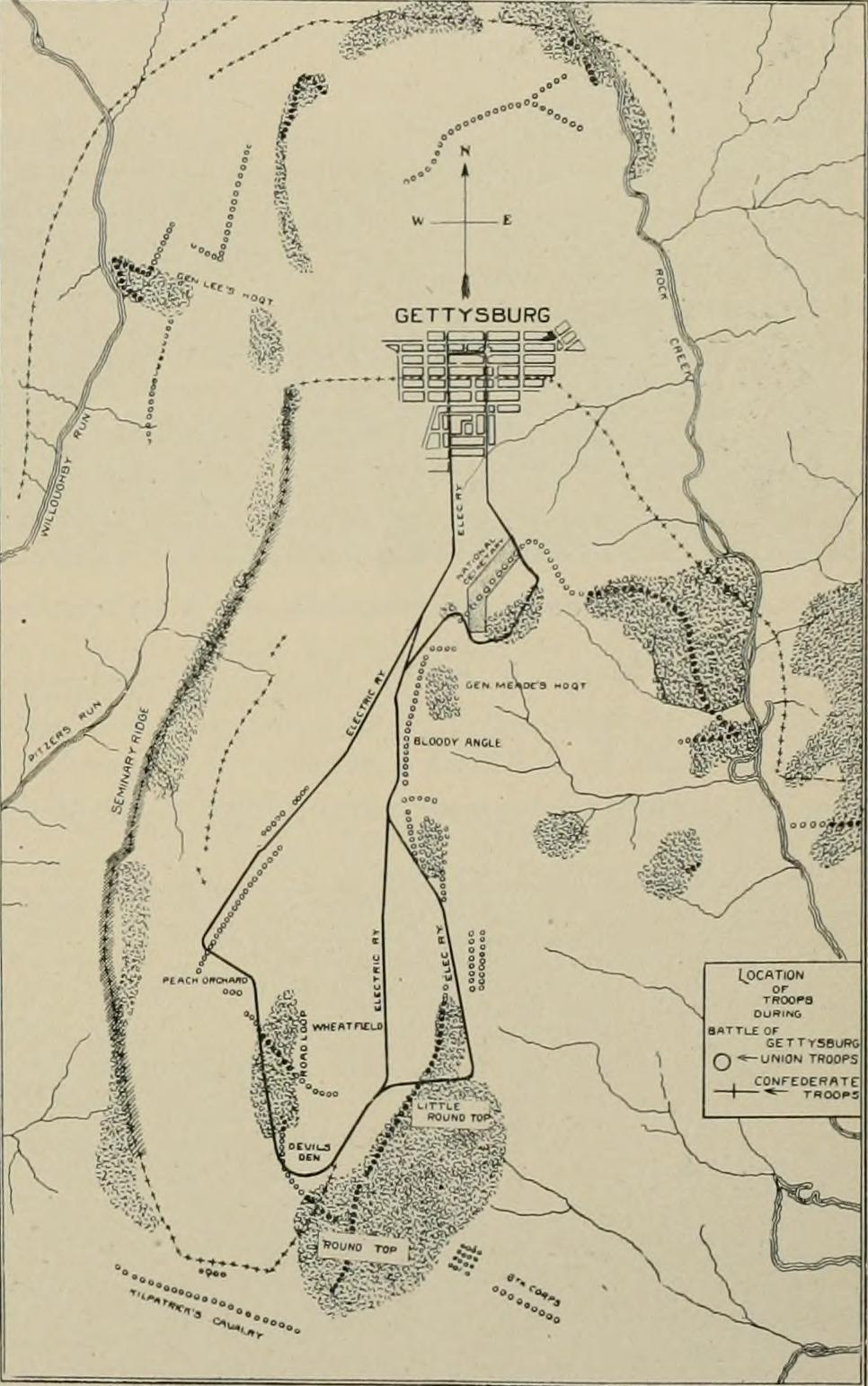
Network map upon opening, as published in Oct.1893.

The Gettysburg Electric Railway Company was chartered August 4, 1891, and incorporated July 28, 1892. In January 1893 the borough of Gettysburg granted trolley right-of-way for all principal streets, and the $150,000 bond was for street operations planned for July 1, 1893. The railway eventually secured rights-of-way for a route west and north of the borough to the area of the Battle of Gettysburg, First Day; but which were never built.

Railbed construction began in April 1893, and the electric power company was chartered on June 15. Tracks were planned along The Angle's stone wall, but instead the trolley used 8,400 ft (2,600 m) of the Emmitsburg Road on which trolleys crossed the Round Top Branch (the trolley was denied right-of-way on the steam train line in both 1893 and 1913.) Beginning April 1, 1894, the trolley was extended from Wible's Woods through Tipton Station to Round Top Station (the line had 7 stops). A new trolley powerhouse of Hummelstown brownstone replaced the original which had burned down by January 22, 1895; and by October 1895 total trackage was 8.5 miles (13.7 km). The 1896 Supreme Court ruled in US v. Gett. Elec. Ry. Co. that the use of eminent domain for historic preservation "seems" to be "a public use".

== Accidents and incidents ==
In 1900, the trolley overhead power line broke at Wible's Woods, and a car derailed in 1901 (trolley machinery was improved in 1902 before Camp Lawton). Events in 1903 included an attempted derailment by sabotage, a moterman struck his head against "an electric pole that was close to the track", and the "Slocum" trolley car jumped the tracks on April 27. A 1904 trolley struck Joseph Keagy, and during both 1904 and the 1908 Camp Hays, lightning storms disabled trolley operations (a Major was struck getting on a car). In 1909 the "Reynolds" car collided with an automobile, and on August 12, 1910, a car struck a mounted Camp Gobin lieutenant. Three days later the "Slocum" and 1909 closed "Sedgwick" cars collided (1 fatality) near Devil's Den where there was a siding. A heated winter car with a closed vestibule was acquired in December 1910. During the July 1913 Gettysburg reunion, 2 trolley cars collided near Devil's Den, and in September a trolley in the borough was rear-ended when a "drunken passenger" pulled the brake cable.

The last trolley car ran in November 1916 when the railway had become obsolete both with disrepair and with increased tourists' use of automobiles on Army-improved battlefield avenues. After 1917 Army appropriations, the tracks were removed by summer crews under foreman Hugh McIlhenny; and plans for trolley extensions from Gettysburg were never completed to several cities:

- west to the Chambersburg & Caledonia trolley line
- north to Carlisle via the Mt. Holly and Gettysburg Street Railway Co (Mt. Holly Trolley Co.),
- northeast to Harrisburg via the Dillsburg, York Springs and Gettysburg Street Railway, and south through Whitehall to connect both
- east to Philadelphia via the Littlestown line through Hanover (cf. Hanover and McSherrystown Street Railway) and
- south to Baltimore via Union Mills, Maryland.

Baltimore Pike-to-Round Top route This list is incomplete; you can help by editing it.
Intersections & Curves	Coordinates
Baltimore Pike @ Evergreen Cem.	39.819868°N 77.22834°W
curve east of Taneytown Road	39.816687°N 77.231151°W
south curve on Taneytown Rd	39.816654°N 77.232299°W
original GNMP gate	800 ft (240 m) along PA 134
"back gate", National Cemetery	39.817562°N 77.232454°W
curve NE of Zeigler's Grove	
curve N of the Brian House	
Emmitsburg Rd "Y of the trolly"	39.815809°N 77.237186°W
parallel trolley tracks
Round Top Branch	39.812805°N 77.23923°W
Spangler switch (tract 17)	a curve was near the Spangler lane
Peach Orchard curve	@ Emmitsburg & Wheatfield roads
curve S from Wheatfield Road	39.800137°N 77.246112°W
Wm Wible's "Wheat-field Park"	25 acres (0.10 km^{2})
curve near 118th PA monument	
De Trobriand Avenue	39°47.805′N 77°14.801′W
Rose Run	39.794565°N 77.246018°W
Brooke Avenue	39°47.609′N 77°14.727′W
Plum Run	39.790167°N 77.243446°W
Tipton Station walkway	39.791379°N 77.241169°W
Warren Avenue	39.792001°N 77.240571°W
Sykes Avenue	39.794579°N 77.234276°W
Wheatfield Rd crossing @ Round Top	39.794425°N 77.232358°W
terminus behind Round Top Station	39.794425°N 77.232358°W

The trolley barn ("track car house") at the SE corner of Washington St and the steamtrain tracks was taken over by the Surefoot Heel and Rubber Co. in 1920. A pedestrian bridge was later constructed across Rose Run on the trolley rail trail between Brooke and De Trobriand avenues. Remnants of the trolley system were registered as historic district contributing structures of the Gettysburg Battlefield Historic District on January 23, 2004; and sections of the railbed remain discernable in modern overhead images.
