= George W. Thompkins =

American Union soldier during Civil War

- Born: April 9, 1841; Otisville, Orange County, New York, U.S.
- Died: February 22, 1934 (aged 92); Schenectady, New York, U.S.
- Burial place: Vale Cemetery, Schenectady
- Military career
- Allegiance: United States of America; Union
- Branch: United States Army; Union Army
- Service years: 1862-1865
- Rank: Corporal
- Unit: 124th New York Infantry Regiment
- Conflicts: American Civil War: Battle of Fort Stedman
- Awards: Medal of Honor

George W. Thompkins (April 9, 1841 - February 22, 1934), also known as George W. Tompkins, was a Union army soldier in the American Civil War. He was awarded the Medal of Honor for his actions with the 124th New York Infantry ("Orange Blossoms") at the Battle of Fort Stedman.

== Early life ==
He was born in Otisville in Orange County, New York.

== Civil War ==
Thompkins enlisted in the Union army in the American Civil War on August 11, 1862, at Port Jervis, New York, for a three-year term. He mustered in as a Private and on September 5, 1862, he was promoted to a Corporal.

== Medal of Honor ==
Thompkins received his Medal of Honor (MOH) on April 6, 1865, for his actions in the Battle of Fort Stedman in Petersburg, Virginia. He was one of five soldiers with the 124th New York Infantry to be awarded the Medal of Honor for their bravery during the Civil War. The others were Sergeant Thomas W. Bradley, Private Archibald C. Freeman, Private Nathan M. Hallock and 1st Lieutenant Lewis S. Wisner. Private Freeman was the only other one to receive a MOH for the capture of a battle flag.

=== Citation ===
For extraordinary heroism on 25 March 1865, while serving with Company F, 124th New York Infantry, in action at Petersburg, Virginia, for capture of flag of 49th Alabama Infantry (Confederate States of America) from an officer who, with colors in hand, was rallying his men.

Date Issued: 6 April 1865

== Death ==
He died on February 22, 1934, in Schenectady, New York and was buried in Vale Cemetery, Schenectady. His name was spelled "George W. Tompkins" on his tombstone, which is his real name. He entered the military under the name "George W. Thompkins."
