= United States v. Gettysburg Electric Railway Co. =

United States v. Gettysburg Electric Ry. Co.
- Supreme Court of the United States

Argued January 8–9, 1896 Decided January 24, 1896
- Full case name: United States v. Gettysburg Electric Railway Company
- Citations: 160 U.S. 668 (more) 16 S. Ct. 427; 40 L. Ed. 576

Holding
- Eminent domain for historic preservation "seems" to be "a public use".

Court membership
- Chief Justice Melville Fuller Associate Justices Stephen J. Field · John M. Harlan; Horace Gray · David J. Brewer; Henry B. Brown · George Shiras Jr. Edward D. White · Rufus W. Peckham

Case opinion
- Majority: Peckham, joined by unanimous

Laws applied
- Appropriation Acts of 1893 (March 3) & 1894 (August 18), 1895 "Sickles Gettysburg Park Bill" (28 Stat. 651)

United States v. Gettysburg Electric Ry. Co., 160 U.S. 668 (1896), was a case to prevent trolley operations on the Gettysburg Battlefield. The dispute began in August 1891 when the Gettysburg Battlefield Memorial Association's board approved attorney Samuel Swope's motion to deny trolley right-of-way along GBMA roads. Despite the 1896 US Supreme Court ruling that the railway could be seized for historic preservation, as well as earlier legislative efforts to appropriate federal acquisition funds, create a War Department commission, and form the Gettysburg National Military Park; the trolley continued operations until obsolete in 1916.

== Background ==
Near the end of the 19th century, tourists to the 1863 Gettysburg Battlefield typically arrived at the borough by train and paid fees for horse-drawn jitney taxis to travel over the battlefield on primitive wagon roads of the private Gettysburg Battlefield Memorial Association. The GBMA owned less than 600 acres (240 ha) of the battlefield's much larger area, and nearly all military engagement areas were privately owned and had twelve small GBMA-owned monument plots of 25 ft × 25 ft (7.6 m × 7.6 m). Some owners rented land for camping, sold souvenirs/refreshments, and by 1894 required top dollar prices for real estate purchases. Similarly, the original battlefield roads had fallen into disrepair after the GBMA funds had become nearly exhausted by late 1882. Despite the preceding 1884 Round Top Branch steamtrain railroad that operated across the field of Pickett's Charge and Hancock Avenue to Round Top Station, an 1892 meeting next-door at the Round Top School formed an opposition committee of Cumberland Township voters (William H. Tipton was the only attendee favoring the trolley, and the township subsequently granted road right-of-way.)

=== Gettysburg Park Commission ===
The Gettysburg Park Commission (GPC) was established by the United States Department of War on March 3, 1893, for "ascertaining the extent of...the trolley" (trolley track construction began April 1893). The Appropriations Act of 1893 on March 3 had funded $25,000, a June 9 supplemental act directed "acquisition and designation by tablets of the lines of battle", and the battlefield survey "was at once commenced" after topographer Emmor Cope was selected at the first commission meeting on July 1. Federal acquisition of land that would become the 1895 Gettysburg National Military Park began on June 2, 1893, with a tract of 0.387 acres (0.157 ha) from John H. Miller & wife. By July 1893, GPC commissioner John B. Bachelder reported to the Secretary of War about battlefield railbed construction (notably planned along the west of The Angle's historic stone wall), and acting secretary Lewis A. Grant referred the complaint to the acting Judge Advocate General.

Trolley right-of-way over the private 900 sq ft (84 m^{2}) 72nd Pennsylvania Infantry Monument tract at The Angle was denied by June 13, 1893; and the route was changed to instead use the Emmitsburg Road. During the July 2–3, 1893, New York Monuments Commission visit for dedicating the 44th New York monument with observation deck on Little Round Top, two altercations against photographer Tipton resulted in a writ by local judge McClean against General Daniel Sickles, General Daniel Butterfield, and two civil war colonels. The writ was followed by an August 2, 1893, trolley complaint to the commonwealth by the GBMA, Edward McPherson, and thirty-nine other citizens; and a counter petition by 268 Gettysburg and 58 Cumberland township citizens favoring the trolley. The PA Attorney General denied action after the subsequent hearing: "the right of owners of private property—whatever public interest may attach to it—to dispose of it to passenger railway corporations, cannot be disputed. ...the line itself...has been chosen with a view of affording tourists the best possible means of visiting and viewing this great battlefield and doing the least possible injury to its natural conditions".

Despite a lack of funds that halted construction in August 1893, the railway began operations as early as September 1893 and was completed to Tipton Park and Round Top Park in 1894. Also despite the lawsuit, a new trolley powerhouse was built to replace the original in the borough that had burnt down by January 22, 1895, and by October 1895 total trackage was 8.5 miles (13.7 km). The trolley system had been sold to a new owner in the month prior to the passage of the February 11, 1895, "Sickles Gettysburg Park Bill" that authorized federal land acquisition to form the Gettysburg National Military Park. Also during the federal suit, the railway company became insolvent and Judge Dallas had placed it into receivership by September 1895.

== Federal case ==
US v. Gett. Elec. Ry. Co. began with the GBMA's April 7, 1894, bill in equity to block trolley use of a particular railway section over Hancock Avenue as recommended by the 72nd PA Infantry committee in 1893: "set aside spots right in the route of the trolley". Likewise, the US District Attorney of a strip of 7.02 acres (2.84 ha) of land on May 3, 1894; and the trolley company responded with a bill in equity to stop the US eminent domain acquisition c. June 11. The US motion to stop construction was dismissed c. June 20 by Judge Dallas of the United States Circuit Court: "powers of congress are distinctly enumerated in the constitution, and in that enumeration none is included to which the uses for which it is proposed to condemn this land can be related, without, in my opinion, enlarging the constitutional grant by grafting upon its express terms a construction so lax and comprehensive as to be subversive of its limited character."

Judge Dallas swore in the jury of Adams County residents on June 29, 1894; and the local hearing in front of the jury was September 11–15 after which "they adjourned for argument in Philadelphia." On November 3, 1894, the jury identified $30,000 "as the measure of damage that would be done the Trolley by the proposed change". Both parties appealed the jury amount as too high/low (the company on November 12, 1894), and the company agreed on November 13 to move tracks from the vicinity of Devil's Den and Tipton Station if the expense would be paid (refused c. December 4). The US attorney Ellery P. Ingham filed an additional petition for condemning a second tract in January 1895, which along with his June 7 petition were denied by the Philadelphia federal court. The 1896 reversal by the Supreme Court of the United States ruled historic preservation "seems" to be "a public use".

== Aftermath ==
"The impression in the town" was the Secretary of War would not pay the $30,000 nor "take further steps" to acquire the railway, and the trolley operated even after the Commission—following a May 7 federal hearing—acquired 2 William H. Tipton tracts of 14.2 acres (5.7 ha) on December 31, 1901. In 1908, Borough of Gettysburg vs. Gettysburg Transit Co. required trolley payment of "car tax" assessed after the company failed to perform agreed maintenance of borough streets (reversed August 1908). In 1909, C. Taylor Leland vs. The Gettysburg Transit Company ordered a trustee's auction in the foreclosure of the 1898 mortgage (purchased in September), and an injury lawsuit was initiated for trolley cars colliding on August 15 near Devil's Den. Trolley operations ended in November 1916 when the railway had become obsolete with disrepair and increased use of battlefield avenues that had been improved with War Department Telford piking.

=== First Army Appropriations Act of 1917 ===
Congressional funding for the seizure failed in an attempted amendment on February 26, 1917. After annual trolley operations on the battlefield hadn't commenced in the spring, the First Army Appropriations Act of 1917 funded $30,000 on May 9 for the "practically abandoned property". Instead of paying damages to the trolley company, the funds paid for removing the tracks and acquiring the associated landowners' tracts (most had been deeded to the US years earlier).

Remnants of the trolley were entered-documented in 2004 as historic contributing structures of the Gettysburg Battlefield Historic District. Similar eminent domain acquisitions include the 1904 United States v. Five Tracts of land that seized land near Reynolds Grove and, on September 18, 1905, Cunningham Grove. The 1974 Gettysburg National Tower, which was on private land not used for military engagements and which had been granted use of federal land, was seized in 2000 and demolished due to its appearance.
