= Brian Farm =

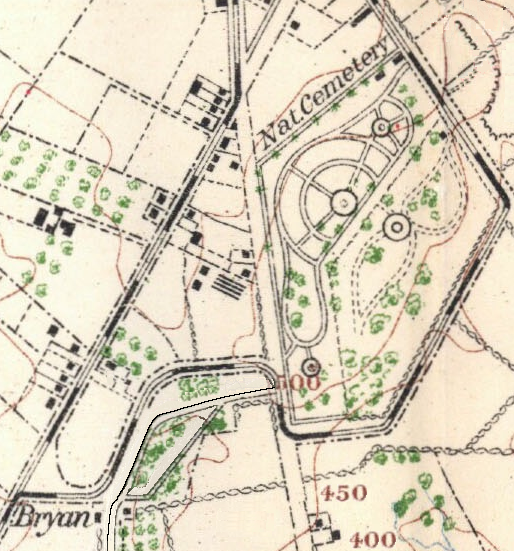
- 1904 map depicting the Brian Farm (lower left "Bryan") with the Emmitsburg Rd "Y [wye] of the trolly" (dashed), which had a right-of-way through the farm.
- Type: American Civil War site
- Location: Gettysburg National Military Park, Pennsylvania
- Coordinates: 39°48.928′N 77°14.11′W
- Area: 12 acres (4.9 ha)
- Elevation: 603.5 ft (183.9 m)

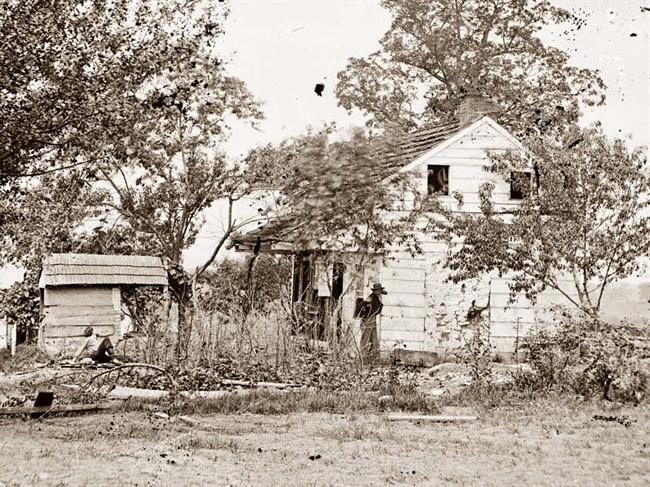
Mid-July 1863 Bryan Farm House and outdoor oven (left). In 1985, this photo was discovered to show biaxially tapered shakes instead of the presumed clay roof tiles (the Germanic roofing technique was subsequently discovered in 19th-century photos of 16 additional Gettysburg area structures.

The Brian Farm is an American Civil War area of the Gettysburg Battlefield used during the Pickett's Charge. On January 23, 2004, the farm's buildings, Boundary Stone Wall, and ID tablet were designated historic district contributing structures after the tract was used for the 1918 Camp Colt and other postwar camps.

== History ==
Abraham Brian (colloquially Bryan as early as 1891) was a free black man who purchased the farm in 1857 just south of Gettysburg, Pennsylvania (his wife died soon and he married a third wife.) The farm included an additional farm dwelling along the Emmitsburg Road. Prior to the battle, Bryan and several other blacks left the area to avoid capture and enslavement.

Battle of Gettysburg: Federal troops positioned around the Bryan House and barn were assaulted by Confederate troops of Mississippi under the command of J. Johnston Pettigrew.

After the battle the house walls were filled with bullet holes, windows were broken, and the furniture was tossed about. Farm fences were gone, crops were trampled, and his orchard trees were useless. Bryan's $1,028 federal claim for property damage resulted in $15 paid for damage by Union troops (he sold the farm in 1869.) Postbellum additions to the Abraham Brian Farm House included a 2nd floor.

The 1883 Gettysburg Cyclorama (which was made in conjunction with William H. Tipton photographs) has a painted image of the house.

The last inhabitant was Ernest Strickhouser in 1940, c. 1950 the 2-story farm house was demolished, and a 1-story reproduction of the Civil War structure was built. Battlefield monuments on the tract include the 111th New York Infantry Monument, 11th Mississippi Infantry Marker, and the Camp Colt commemorative pine tree and marker. The Gettysburg Battlefield Memorial Association acquired a 19th-century right-of-way and built a carriage road between the house and barn--Grand Central Avenue (now Hancock Avenue) was Telfordized (paved) shortly after GBMA lands transferred to the War Department before the turn of the century.
