= Camp Colt, Pennsylvania =

World War I military installation in Pennsylvania

Camp Colt
- Part of United States Army
- Gettysburg Battlefield, Adams County, Pennsylvania
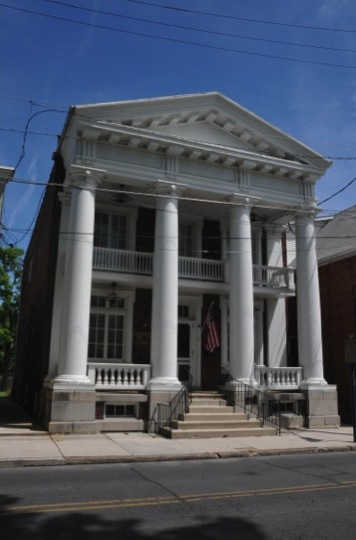
- House Captain Eisenhower lived in at Camp Colt in 1918

Site information
- Type: Tank Corps recruit training
- Controlled by: National Park Service
- Open to the public: 1 commemorative tablet at Memorial Pine Tree, 1 display with images

Site history
- In use: 1918–1919
- Demolished: 1919, Lewis Wrecking Co
- Events: 1918 flu pandemic First Transcontinental Motor Convoy (1919)

Garrison information
- Past commanders: Dwight D. Eisenhower

Camp Colt was a military installation near Gettysburg, Pennsylvania used for Tank Corps recruit training prior to deployment in World War I. The camp used the Gettysburg Battlefield site of the previous Great Reunion of 1913 and the preceding 1917 World War I recruit training camp for U.S. troops along the Round Top Branch.

Camp Colt was established in 1917, and opened at Gettysburg National Military Park in March, 1918 as the first post to train soldiers to use tanks during World War I. The main section of the camp was in the fields made famous 55 years before on July 3, 1863, by Pickett's Charge ordered by Confederate Commanding General Robert E. Lee. The commander of Camp Colt was Captain Dwight D. Eisenhower with it being his first command. Eisenhower would earn the rank of Major, and the Distinguished Service Medal for his efforts at Camp Colt, and he and his wife, Mamie, fell in love with the area. After retiring from the military, the Eisenhowers made their home near Gettysburg, west of Seminary Ridge.

Chronology
Date	Event
1918-03-06	A United States Tank Corps camp with "no designation" was established at the "Camp, United States Troops, Gettysburg, PA" for "preliminary training to fit [tank soldiers] as rapidly as possible to go overseas for their finishing technical and tactical courses at the American training centers in England and France."
1918-03	The first contingent of soldiers was assigned to the camp (e.g., from Camp Cody, New Mexico).
1918-03-22	Trains from Camp Dix and Camp Upton arrived with 500 troops that increased the camp to ~1000.
1918-03-23	Despite Eisenhower's March 25 orders to the "Tank Service Camp at Gettysburg", the camp had been named for Samuel Colt, e.g., subsequent April 20 orders directed 1st Lt T. H. Symmes to "Camp Colt".
1918-03-24	Capt Garner (302nd Heavy Tank Battalion) transferred command of Camp Colt to Captain Eisenhower, who received a 1924 Distinguished Service Medal for commanding the campform. From Camp Meade, 123 men arrived via a special Western Maryland train.
1918-04-08	A blizzard covered Camp Colt with 24 inches of snow just prior to Mamie Eisenhower's arrival. On December 4, 1994, a PHMC marker was placed at the 1918 Eisenhower home at 157 N. Washington St.
1918-04	The 3rd Tank Company was organized at Camp Colt in the National Army as Company A, 328th Battalion, Tank Corps.
1918-05	Companies B & C of the 303d Battalion were formed at Camp Colt, and the camp newspaper, Treat 'Em Rough, was established. In August, the paper featured a description of the town of Gettysburg. As of January 2009, neither the U.S. Army Heritage and Education Center, the Adams County Historical Society, nor the Adams County Library have any copies of the Camp Colt newspaper.
1918-05-30	The Camp Colt Drum Corps participated in the Memorial Day procession from Gettysburg to the National Cemetery, and the Camp Colt "Athletic Carnival" on Memorial Day was held on Nixon Field at Pennsylvania College. (Note: The New York Times. 1918-05-29 https://timesmachine.nytimes.com/timesmachine/1918/05/29/118142497.pdf.) An April 26 field day had been held at the camp, and the Camp Colt baseball team played an Independence Day game against the local team, with future Hall of Famer Eddie Plank playing left field for Gettysburg. The camp's YMCA Athletic Director was George LeRoy Alenifer.
1918-06-05	Doctors' quarters were erected at Camp Colt, and nurses at the U.S. Army Post Hospital subsequently included Helen G. Hill (chief nurse), Grace E. Baker, Mary R. Helstrom, Helen Lauffer, Edna Merrill, Honor A. Barry, Helene Hugues, Margaretha A. Lehman, Elizabeth M. Harty, Nelle M. Bream, and Francis MacKey.
1918-06	A Renault light tank arrived at the camp.
1918-06-21	The Episcopal Parish House was a recreation center for camp soldiers, and the Gettysburg Academy was quarters for some Camp Colt officers' families (Stevens Hall was the old Gettysburg Academy building).
1918-06-28	The Adams County court naturalized several hundred new US citizens in the YMCA tent at Camp Colt (53 more were naturalized on July 15, 47 more on September 30).
1918-07-01	Camp Colt consisted of "176 acres of the Codori farm, 10 acres of the Smith farm, and 6 acres of the Bryan House place", and was the only "camp for Tank Corps troops". The camp included an Officer's Training School, and Walter F. Burke of the Quartermaster Corps was the first officer commissioned by Eisenhower (Howard T Torkelson graduated October 15).
1918-07-11	The 330th Battalion was at Camp Colt.
circa 1918-07-15	Col William H Clopton, Jr, arrived in the US; and prior to July 27, Camp Colt troops were ordered to his tank training center at Tobyhanna, Pennsylvania (Note: The New York Times. 1918-07-27 https://timesmachine.nytimes.com/timesmachine/1918/07/27/102727329.pdf.) (~2000 Camp Colt men transferred to Tobyhanna, (Note: The New York Times. 1918-09-16 https://timesmachine.nytimes.com/timesmachine/1918/09/16/106216100.pdf.) e.g., the 302nd & 326th Battalions). Tobyhanna had 2 tanks and ~2200 men. To "form the nucleus" of the tank training center that subsequently transferred from Tobyhanna to Camp Polk in September, a heavy battalion from Camp Colt was sent to Camp Polk (Clopton was ordered to Camp Meade on February 24, 1919). (Note: The New York Times. 1919-02-25 https://timesmachine.nytimes.com/timesmachine/1919/02/25/97079263.pdf.)
1918-07-16	A "Soldier's Club" was leased at Dr. L. L. Sieber's residence in Gettysburg. On April 19, 1919, the "War Camp Community activity in Gettysburg" ended operations at the Soldier's Club. (called an "Officer's Club" during the 2003 recognition for historic preservation at 37 West Middle St).
1918-08-22	Deputy US Marshal Harvey L. Smith, of Harrisburg, ordered all Gettysburg bars, clubs, and wholesale bottling works to stop the sale of liquor (the March agreement by local establishments to only sell alcohol for consumption at the establishments was unsuccessful). Eisenhower had even assigned military guards at one off-limits establishment to prevent it from being used.
1918-09-30	A Camp Colt quarantine had been implemented for the 1918 flu pandemic. In September, the camp reached a peak of 10,600 officers and men.
1918-09-15	With 1000 Camp Colt and Tobyhanna soldiers (150 of whom took the stage), "Major D. D. Eisenhower, commander at Gettysburg, and his [Camp Colt] staff" attended a Tank Corps Welfare League benefit show at the Century Theatre in New York City with performances by Enrico Caruso, George M. Cohan, Anna Fitziu, and Al Jolson. (Note: The New York Times. 1918-09-16 https://timesmachine.nytimes.com/timesmachine/1918/09/16/106216100.pdf.)
1918-10-09	New influenza cases for the day at Camp Colt totalled 93.
1918-10-10	By 8 AM, 121 Camp Colt soldiers had died since the beginning of the flu pandemic. (e.g., William J. MacDonald subsequently died October 14 from spinal meningitis after the flu).
1918-10	The 310th Tank Center was established at Camp Colt, as were the 338th, 339th, & 346th Tank Battalions. John Montgomery Mahon was the commander of Camp Colt's 310 Brigade Headquarters.
1918-10-14	Eisenhower was ordered to embark his unit from New York City on November 18 for France, but the deployment was overcome by the event of the Nov 11 armistice.
1918-11-11	The Tank Corps had 483 officers and 7700 enlisted men in the United States.
1918-11-18	Eisenhower's command at Camp Colt ended, and he was at Camp Dix until December 22.
1918-11-22	Patients from the camp hospital were transferred to Fort McHenry, and Earl M. Lawrence died at the camp of the flu on November 27. The pandemic claimed 150 camp soldier's lives, and the local Gettysburg Hospital was planned as a result of the camp's illnesses (the cornerstone was laid July 1, 1919).
1918-12-01	The camp of over 200 acres on the Codori, Trostle, Smith, and Brian farms had less than 6000 soldiers.
1918-12-24	Eisenhower arrived at Camp Benning where about 250 Camp Colt soldiers were also transferred after the armistice.
1919-04-11	The Motor Transport Corps arrived to move Camp Colt vehicles to Camp Holabird: 18 Riker, 6 Packard, & 10 Dodge trucks; 1 Reo; 4 Dodge touring cars; 1 Ford ambulance; and 48 motorcycles.
1919-05-17	A Liberty Loan Drive volunteer was given a ride from the Camp Colt landing field in a "Curtiss Acrobatic Aeroplane" by Air Service Sgt Walter Shaffer who had downed a German bomber over Reims Cathedral.
1919-05-24	Camp Colt buildings had been sold to the Lewis Wrecking Co.
1919-06-30	Camp Colt had a very small guard under the Quartermaster Corps.
1919-08	The 1919 Motor Transport Corps convoy that had left Washington, D.C., on July 7 passed through the Camp Colt site after lunch and a ceremony south of the Gettysburg Battlefield (Eisenhower had joined the convoy in Frederick, Maryland).
1919-08-08	Captain Fred P. Desmond (quartermasters commander at Camp Colt), 2 corporals, and 11 civilian employees remained of the 15,000 who had been at Camp Colt (Quartermaster Headquarters was on Chambersburg St). Cook James J. Matranga was assigned to the camp from 1917-1919.
1919-08-15	Camp Colt closed.
1932-08	The 1st Camp Colt reunion was held. Eisenhower was honored during the 1954 World Wars Tank Corps Association reunion when they planted a 22-foot "Memorial Pine Tree" with a tablet at 39°48.893′N 77°14.253′W. Dirt from various states was used, including Connecticut soil from Samuel Colt's "Colt Park" estate (Note: "Tanker Briefs" (Google News Archive). August 28, 1954. "Harry Cunningham ... was chief electrician at" Camp Colt) (Samuel Colt also had a Maine fishing camp named "Camp Colt".)

External images
- tents on Spangler Farm
- buildings along Emmitsburg Rd
- tank on Gettysburg Battlefield
