= Augustus van Horne Ellis =

American lawyer

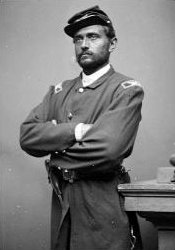
- Born: May 1, 1827; New York City, U.S.
- Died: July 2, 1863 (aged 36); Gettysburg, Pennsylvania, U.S.
- Burial place: St. Mark's Church in the Bowery
- Spouse: Julia Verplanck
- Relatives: John Stoneacre Ellis, Henry Ashfield Ellis, Julius Ellis, Samuel Ellis, Susan Ellis
- Military career
- Allegiance: Kingdom of Hawaii; United States
- Branch: Hawaiian Navy; Union Army
- Service years: 1861–1863
- Rank: Colonel
- Nickname: Gus
- Units: 71st New York State Militia; 56th New York Volunteer Infantry
- Commands: 124th New York Volunteer Infantry Regiment
- Conflicts: American Civil War: First Battle of Bull Run; Battle of Chancellorsville; Battle of Gettysburg †

Augustus van Horne Ellis (May 1, 1827 – July 2, 1863) was an American lawyer, sea captain, and soldier. He was a brevet brigadier general in the Union Army during the Civil War, and was killed in action at the Battle of Gettysburg.

== Early life and career ==
A.V.H. Ellis was born in New York City to parents Samuel Corp Ellis and Eliza Van Horne on May 1, 1827 and educated in the city's public schools. He later attended Columbia University. Prior to the outbreak of the Civil War, he was a lawyer in New York City. At some point, he moved to California, where he became a tax commissioner and a fireman, and later, a sea captain. Ellis is said to have voyaged to the Kingdom of Hawaii, where he became friends with the king of the islands. Kamehameha III appointed Ellis as the head of the Hawaiian Navy, but when Ellis discovered that the navy had no warships, he returned to California and became captain of a steamship.

== The sinking of the Opelousas ==
In 1857, A.V.H Ellis was standing Captain of the steamship S.S Opelousas which was sailing between Galveston, Texas and Berwicks Bay, Louisiana in the Gulf of Mexico. On the night of November 12, 1857, at about 12 o'clock, the steamships Opelousas and Galveston, both belonging to the same company, came in collision while on the passage between Galveston and Berwick Bay; by this accident eighteen people died, and the Opelousas became a total wreck. Captain Ellis, as well as the crews of the Opelousas and the Galveston, turned themselves into the US Commissioner in New Orleans and were put on trial for the loss of the ship. All men were acquitted and set free.

== Civil War ==
When the Civil War began, Ellis was living in New Windsor, New York. He joined the 71st New York State Militia as a captain and accompanied the regiment to Washington, D.C., where it became part of the newly organized Army of Northeastern Virginia under Brig. Gen. Irwin McDowell. Ellis saw his first combat action at the First Battle of Bull Run. He was then asked by Charles H. Van Wyck to help train the 56th New York Volunteer Infantry, a three-years' volunteer regiment. On September 5, 1862, Ellis became the first colonel of the newly raised 124th New York Infantry. The regiment had been recruited from mainly Orange County. After training and drilling, the 124th joined the Army of the Potomac in Northern Virginia.

Ellis and his men saw no heavy fighting until May 1863. Then, at the Battle of Chancellorsville, he gave the 124th the nickname of "Orange Blossoms". He admonished the soldiers, "Let the girls of old Orange hear a good report of this day's work." The regiment lost 40% of its strength at Chancellorsville.

Within a month after Chancellorsville, the 124th marched north with the rest of the Army of the Potomac towards Gettysburg. The regiment was part of Ward's Brigade in Birney's Division of Daniel Sickles' III Corps. On the second day of action at Gettysburg, they found themselves posted on Houck's Ridge near the large rocks of Devil's Den. Because of the heavy casualties at Chancellorsville, the 124th only numbered 18 officers and 220 men when it went into action against John Bell Hood's Confederate division on July 2.

Their position fronted a triangular-shaped field. As Benning's brigade attacked the 124th, Ellis and his field officers remained mounted on their horses. An officer in the regiment protested, but Ellis' major, James Cromwell simply stated "The men must see us today." This phrase gave title to a painting by Civil War artist Don Troiani that depicts Ellis and the 124th at Gettysburg. By all accounts, Ellis was brave and cool during the fighting. He remained in the saddle, sword drawn, urging his men to stand firm among the extreme chaos and smoke of the fighting. At the height of the fighting, a bullet slammed into Ellis's forehead. He pitched dead off his horse.

In the battle for control of the triangular field, the 124th New York lost 28 men killed, 57 wounded and 5 missing. Ellis's body was returned to New York City, where he was buried in St. Mark's Church in-the-Bowery. The specific location of Ellis' body in the churchyard was uncertain until 2007, when the burial site was positively identified via church archival records by Dr. Gary Brucato and Attila Deak in the course of freelance field research for a book by Civil War historian E. F. Bishop.

== Memorialization ==
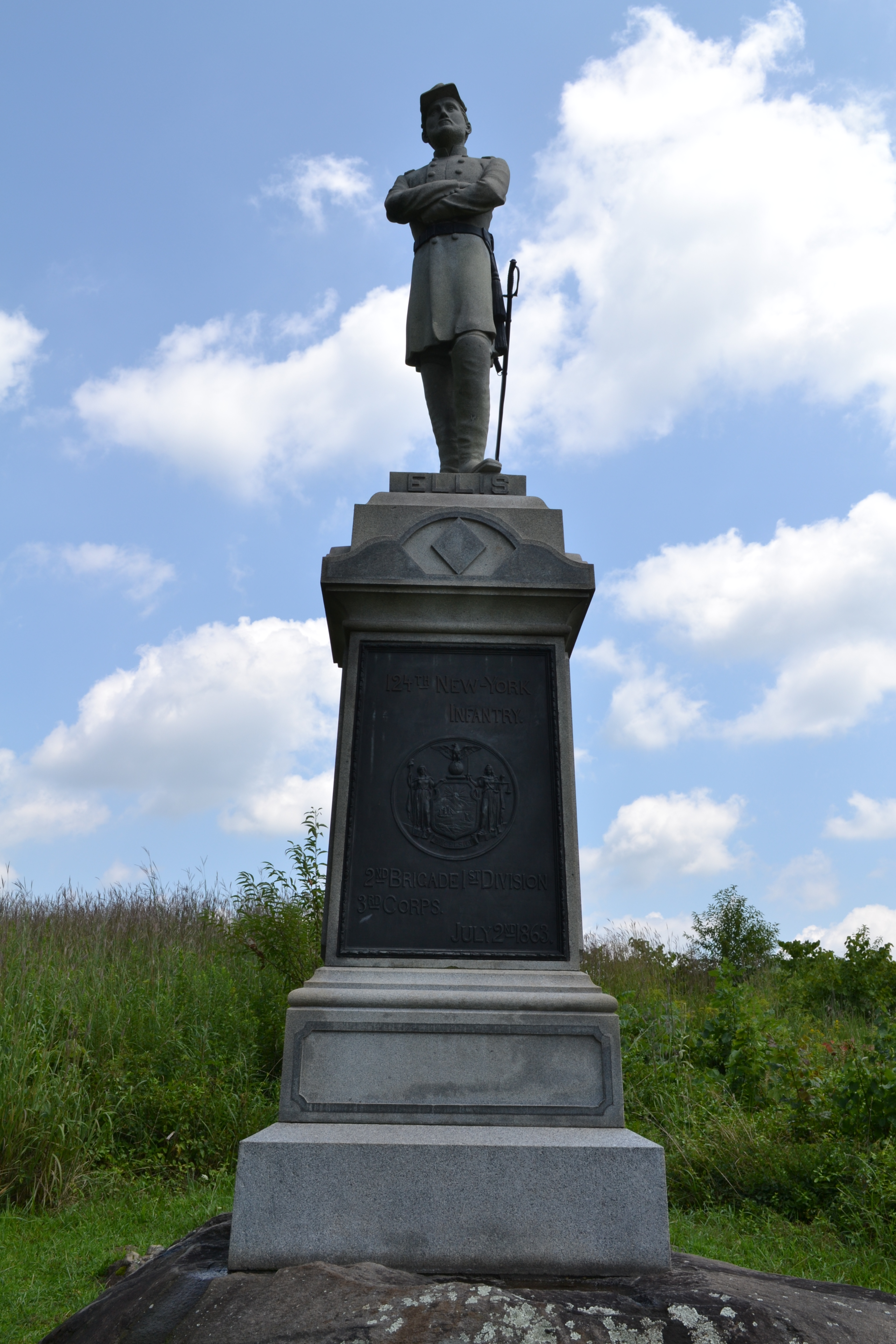
Monument to 124th New York at Gettysburg's Devil's Den, featuring Colonel Ellis.

After the war, the citizens of Orange County raised money to erect a monument to the 124th Regiment at Gettysburg. Dedicated on July 2, 1884, it was the first regimental New York monument placed on the field. Located on Houck's Ridge where the regiment stood above the triangular field, the monument has a life-sized statue of Colonel Ellis, standing with his arms folded gazing calmly ahead. It is the only official full-sized statue of a Union regimental commander at Gettysburg.

In 1868, the United States Army built a new fort in Gallatin County, Montana Territory, to provide protection for travelers using the Bozeman Trail. The post was named "Fort Ellis". It served as a base for part of the 2nd U.S. Cavalry until being decommissioned in 1886.

The Augustus van Horne Ellis Camp #124 of the Sons of Union Veterans of the Civil War in Goshen, New York, was named in his honor. The camp annually awards a high school senior the Augustus van Horne Ellis Memorial Scholarship.

A friend of Ellis recalled that he was "a rather cold, harsh ambitious man, and sometimes chilled us with his terrible bursts of profanity; but he was every inch a soldier."
