= Vale Cemetery and Vale Park =

Historic cemetery in New York, United States

- U.S. National Register of Historic Places
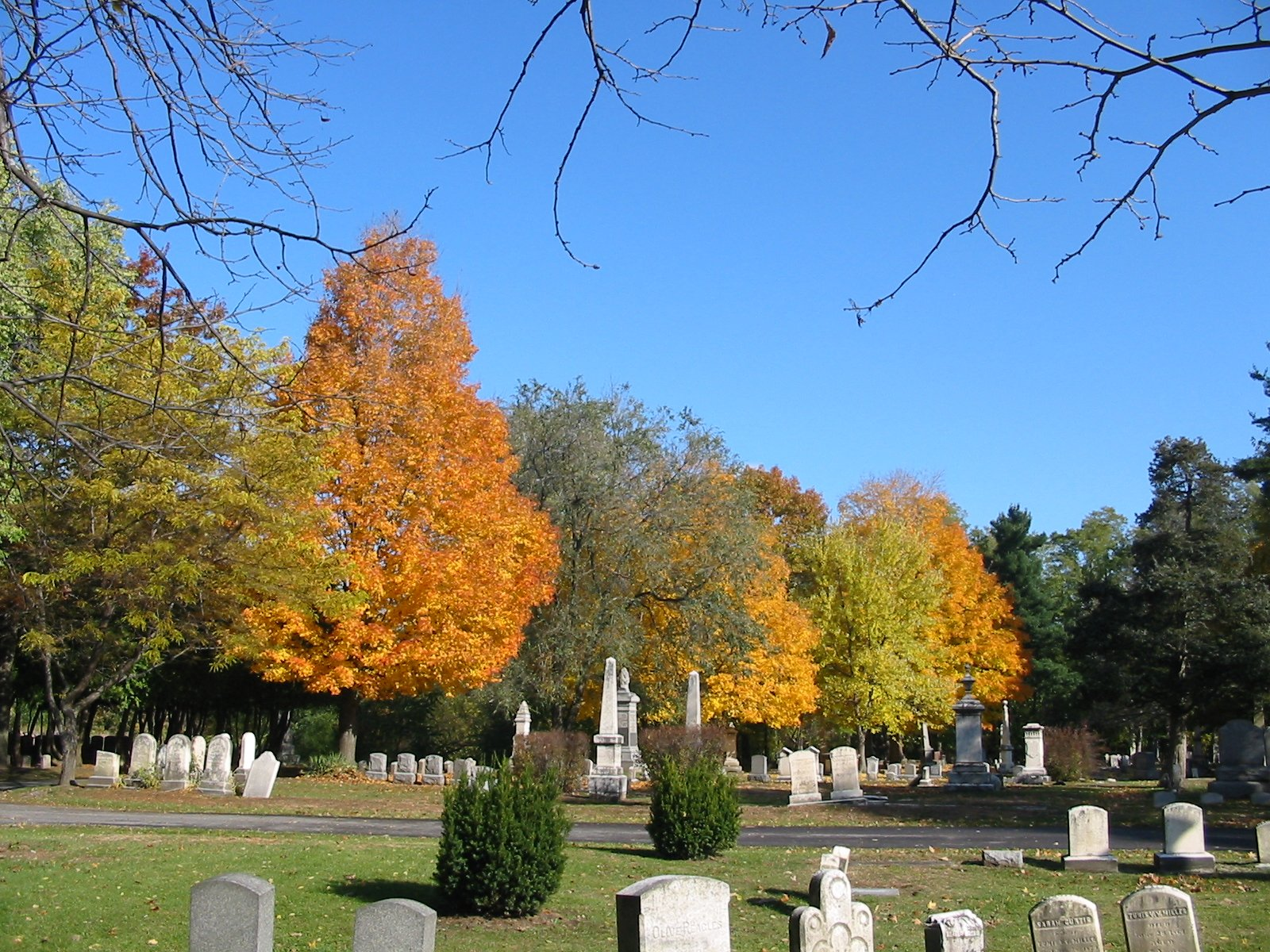
- Vale Cemetery, October 2003

- Location within New York Location within the United States
- Location: 907 State St., Nott Terrace, Schenectady, New York
- Coordinates: 42°48′26″N 73°55′45″W
- Area: 100 acres (40 ha)
- Built: 1857
- Architect: Thomas, Burton A.; Doyle, John
- NRHP reference No.: 04001053
- Added to NRHP: September 24, 2004

Vale Cemetery is a historic rural cemetery and the largest cemetery in Schenectady, New York. It opened on 21 October 1857, when the Rev. Julius Seely dedicated what was then termed "the Vale". It has tripled its size since opening and today it holds the remains of some of the most notable persons in Upstate New York. In 1973, a 35-acre tract of unused and abandoned cemetery land around the ponds of Cowhorn Creek was sold to the city of Schenectady to form Vale Park.

The cemetery and park were listed on the National Register of Historic Places in 2004.

== History ==
By 1850 the old public burying ground on Green and Front streets was being overrun with weeds and was described as being unsanitary. The Common Council resolved on 2 July 1856 to develop the grounds of the old Hospital Farm on Nott Terrace as a 38-acre (150,000 m^{2}) public cemetery. On 16 June 1857, Mayor Benjamin V. S. Vedder appointed a committee to oversee the work.

To provide access from a main street, Dr Eliphalet Nott, the President of Union College donated an avenue from Nott Terrace into the grounds. Later in 1863, two pieces of land were purchased from the college, creating what is now known as Vale Park. The entrance on State Street was a donation from the First Reformed Church in 1867. The cemetery was planned by Burton Thomas as a rural cemetery. It featured many winding paths and he had more than 1,000 trees planted; Cowhorn Creek was dammed to create a lake within the grounds. The cemetery has since expanded and covers approximately 100 acres (0.40 km^{2}) and holds some 33,000 burials. The cemetery includes the historic African-American Burying Ground. Since 2001, city residents have held annual commemorations of Juneteenth, celebrating emancipation and the end of the American Civil War; particularly since 2006, some have been held at the Burying Ground.

== Vale Cemetery Association ==
In February 1858, the Common Council declared that it could not continue to run the cemetery at the taxpayers' expense and that the cemetery must be taken up by private owners. Fourteen of the lot holders formed the Vale Cemetery Association and bought the 38 acres (150,000 m^{2}) from the Common Council. They paid the sum of $800, and announced that some land, known as the Potters' Field, would be set aside for the burial of the poor. In 2007 as part of the Schenectady Colonial celebrations, the Association held a dinner to celebrate the 150th anniversary of the cemetery.

== Vale mapping project ==
In late 2006, interest in mapping the cemetery was indicated by several people connected with the cemetery. They developed the Vale mapping project. The project started in spring 2007, using GPS and techniques used in England and Scotland to locate each grave. The group intends to map all the graves and document them, to establish a full record before there is further damage or deterioration of many of the historic memorials.

== Gallery ==
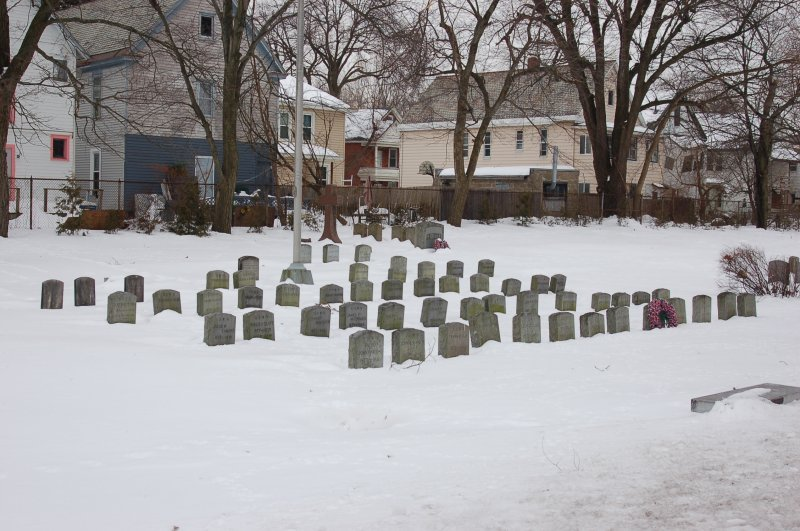
Veterans plot, February 2007

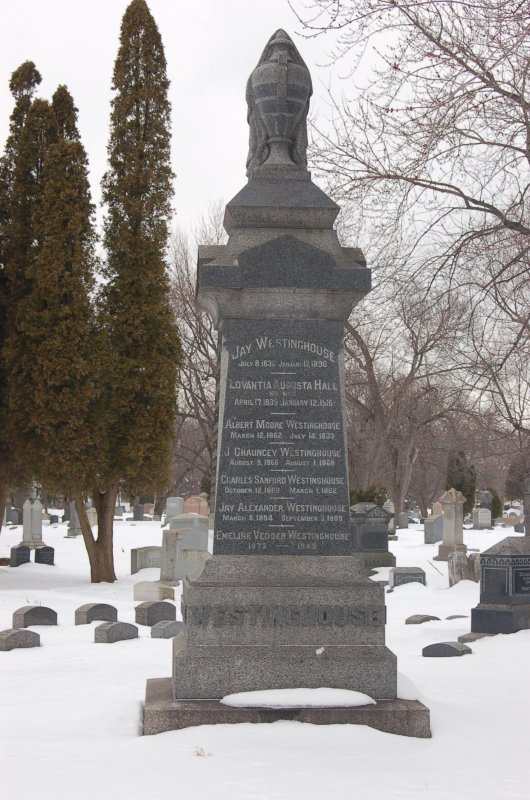
Westinghouse Family memorial, February 2007

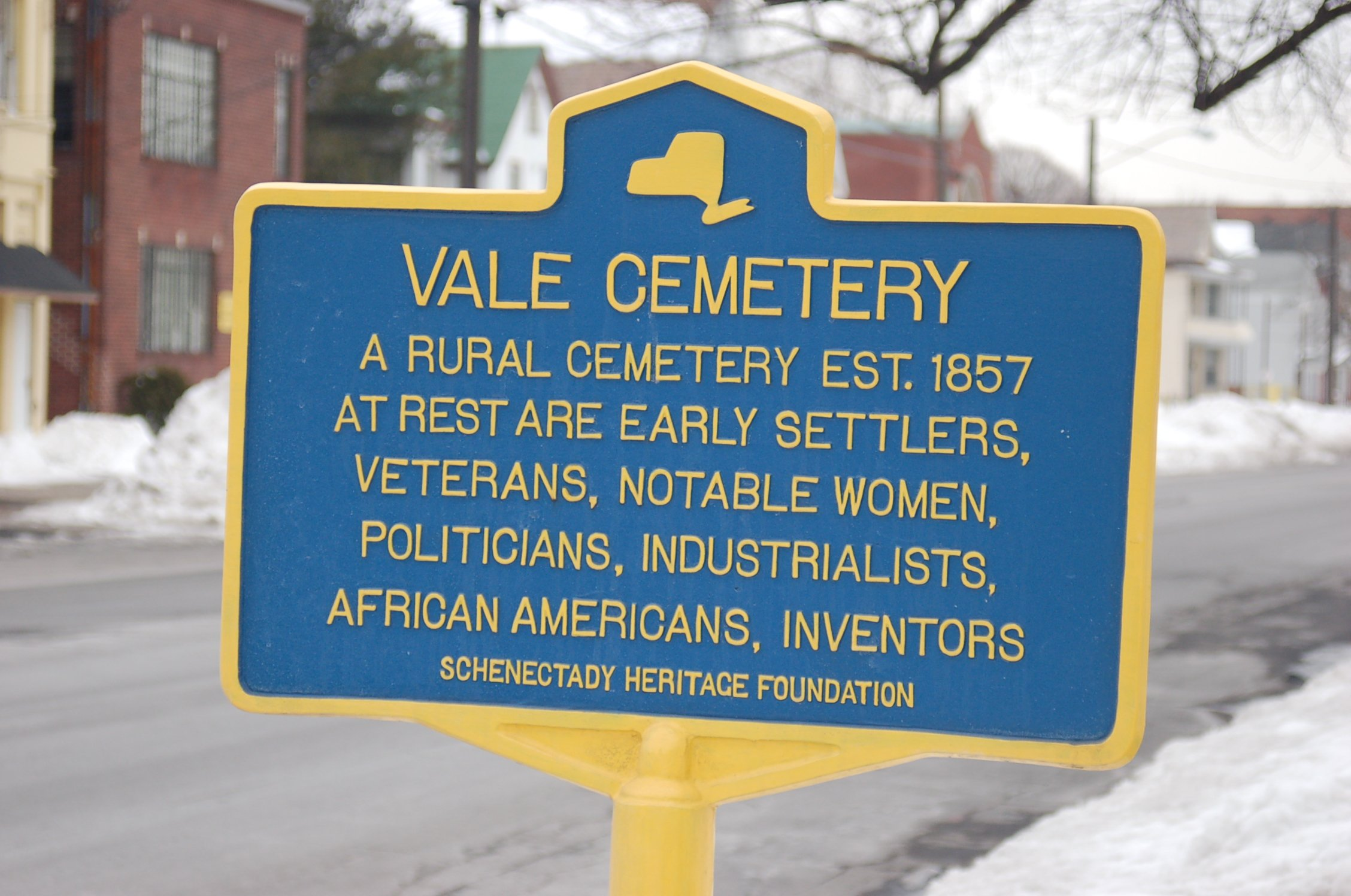
State Street entrance sign, February 2007

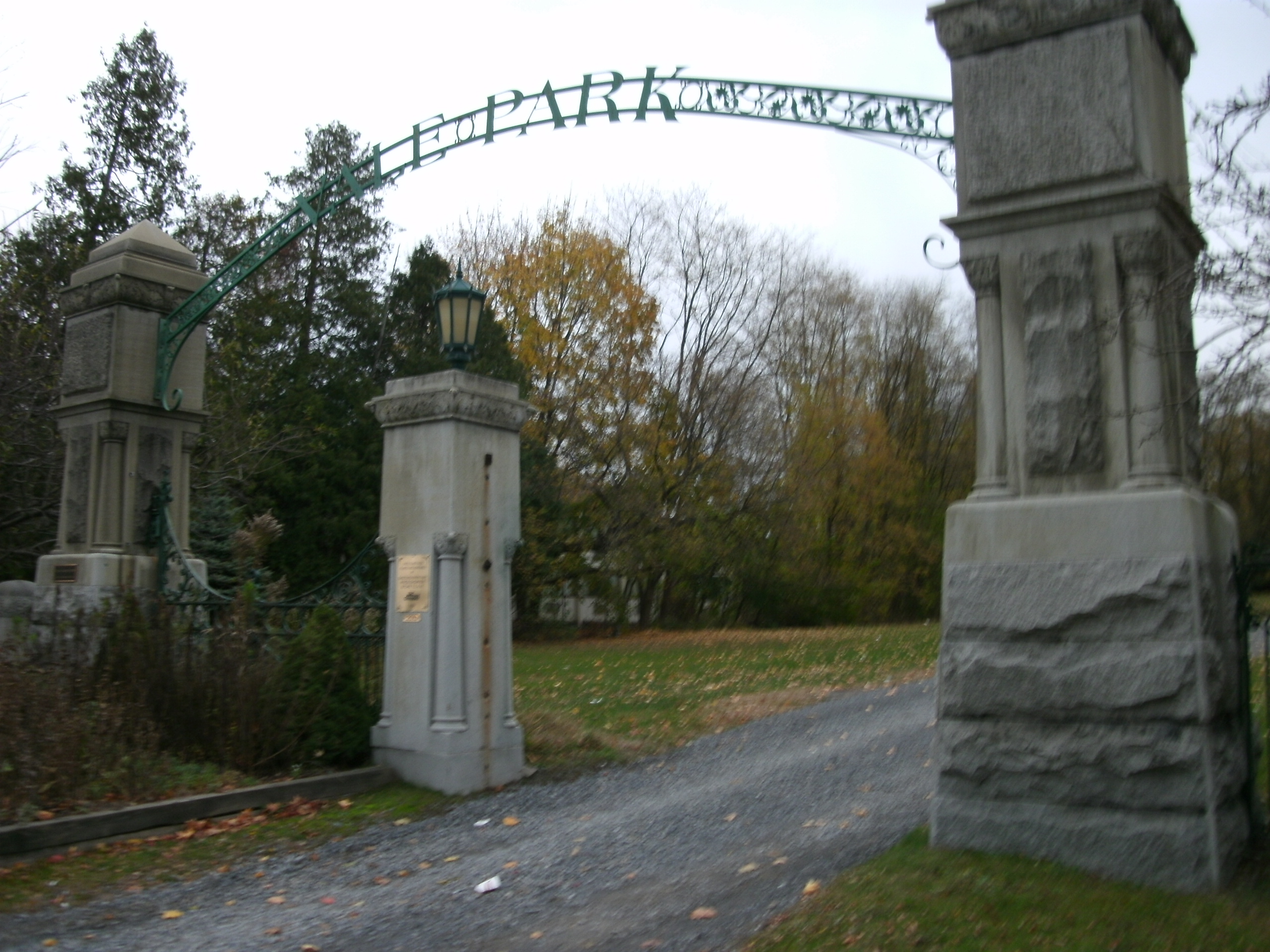
Vale Park entrance, November 2010

== Notable burials ==
The information on notable burials has been extracted and précised from Katherine Olney Delain's Biographies of Notables at Vale Cemetery (2005).

=== Engineers and scientists ===
- Ernst Alexanderson – came to the United States in 1901 to meet electrical wizard Charles Steinmetz. Developed the Alexanderson alternator, the first radio transmitter used to broadcast the human voice. Dr. Alexanderson was also instrumental in the development of television. Over his lifetime, Dr. Alexanderson received 344 patents, the last awarded in 1973 at age 94.
- Ellis Family – The father and two sons were presidents of Schenectady Locomotive Works, later to become American Locomotive Company.
- Ernst Julius Berg (1871–1941) – mathematician and electro-physicist. A pioneer of radio, he produced the first two-way radio voice program in the United States.
- Clute Brothers – produced the gun turret motors for the first ironclad ship, the USS Monitor.
- William D. Coolidge (1873–1975) – inventor of the modern X-ray tube, head of General Electric Development Center. He also developed the sodium vapor lamp and was holder of 83 patents.
- Philip Dodge – inventor of the Linotype machine
- Henry Ramsey – N.Y.S. engineer and surveyor in the 1830s, worked on the Erie Canal
- Christian Steenstrup (1873–1955) – born in Denmark emigrated to the US in 1894. Designed the Monitor Top Refrigerator while at General Electric, held over 100 patents.
- Charles Proteus Steinmetz (1865–1923) – mathematician, inventor, and electrical engineer, was a pioneer and considered the leading electrical engineer in the United States during his lifetime. He was also a professor of electrical engineering and electrophysics at Union College, Schenectady.
- Silas Watson Ford – paleontologist who made some of the most important discoveries of the 19th century about the Cambrian Period. Awarded an honorary master's degree by Union College in 1879.

=== Military ===
- Nicholas F. Beck (1796–1830) – Adjutant General of New York
- James S. Casey (1833–1899) – awarded Medal of Honor for action on 8 January 1877 at Wolf Mountain, Montana during the Battle of Wolf Mountain during the Black Hills War.
- William Horsfall – as captain, Company E, 18th New York Infantry. The Grand Army of the Republic post in Schenectady was named for him. He died leading a charge during the Battle of South Mountain, September 14, 1862.
- Charles Lewis – fought in the Civil War and witnessed 1865 assassination of President Abraham Lincoln in 1865
- David S. Proper – volunteer fire-fighter who enlisted in the 134th New York during the Civil War. He was killed at Gettysburg 1 July 1863. Donations from other firefighters paid for his body to be returned and buried here.
- George W. Thompkins – awarded Medal of Honor for action on 25 March 1865 at the Battle of Fort Stedman

=== Politicians and government ===
- Henry S. De Forest (1847–1917) – 40th and 42nd Mayor of Schenectady in 1885 and then 1889 and then U.S. congressman (1911–1913)
- John DeGraff (1783–1848) – Fifteenth Mayor of Schenectady in 1836 and U.S. House of Representatives 1827–1829 and again 1837–1839
- Henry Glen (1739–1814) – first Town Clerk of Schenectady (1767–1809), member of New York Provincial Congress and New York State Assembly, New York Militia and Continental Army officer in American Revolution, member of United States House of Representatives, 1793–1801. (Location of grave not known. Presumed buried in First Dutch Churchyard. Remains there later relocated to Vale. Not all gravestones transported, so exact burial site not known.)
- Oswald D. Heck – elected to the New York State Assembly in 1937. Speaker of the house from 1939–1959. There is a gavel on his tombstone.
- Mordecai Myers (1776–1871) – 21st Mayor of Schenectady
- Harmanus Peek (1782–1838) – Early congressman and Representative 1819–1821)
- Peter Rowe (1807–1876) – 20th Mayor of Schenectady (1846–1850) and later U.S. Representative (1853–1855)
- Jackson Samuel – New York State Supreme Court Justice

=== Sports ===
- Charles "Chick" Evans (1889–1916) – Pitcher for the Boston Braves 1909–1910. his win–loss record for 1910 was 1–1, his run average was 5.23.
- Frank E Wickware – A World War I veteran, pitched for the Mohawk Giants in the Negro leagues. Once defeated baseball Hall of Fame member Walter Johnson

=== Various ===
- Francis Dana – Activist in the Underground Railway and contributor to the Albany Abolitionist newspaper.
- Eliphalet Nott, D.D., L.L.D. – Fourth President of Union College, serving 1804–1866.
- Robert Furman – Local businessman who donated land to form Central Park and helped establish Vale Cemetery. He introduced trolleys to Schenectady.
- Westinghouse Family – George Westinghouse was well known in the farming industry having invented the thresher. George Westinghouse Jr., competitor of Thomas Edison, developed innovations in the electrical and railroad industries. He and his wife are buried in Arlington National Cemetery.
- James Cuff Swits – (known as Indian Jim), a Mohawk man more than 8 feet tall. He was well respected for his knowledge of herbs. A friend carved Indian Jim's likeness into his gravestone; he was buried at Potters Field.

== Burial facts ==
- The first burial was of four-year-old Noah Vibbard Van Vorst.
- The oldest burial is that of Elias Van Guysling who died in 1695. His remains were relocated from the family plot on Van Slyk Island when General Electric enlarged their site.
- The oldest grave marker is that of Jan Maybee, of Mabee House, who died in 1725.

== Sections ==
The cemetery is divided into several sections, each having its own historic importance:

- Veterans Section – veterans from the Civil War and Spanish–American War are buried here, as well as later ones.
- First Reformed Church – The graves in this section predate the formation of Vale Cemetery. They were moved in 1879 from various small First Reformed Church cemeteries scattered throughout the Stockade. The oldest marker is that of Jan Mabee, survivor of the Schenectady Massacre, who died in 1725.
- African Section (now called the African-American Burying Ground) – the original African Cemetery was located on Hamilton Hill. Judge Alonzo C. Paige purchased that area for real estate development. He purchased space in Vale and had the remains re-interred at his expense. His action protected the graves, as people had disturbed the graves on the hill by removing sandy soil for cement making.
- Union College Plot – reserved for full professors of Union College, their spouses and unmarried children.
- Green Street Section – represents the memorial style c. 1701–1830. The stones were removed from the old cemetery and reset here in 1879.
- Christian Temple
- German Methodist – this area was used by descendants of the early 18th-century German Palatine communities in the Mohawk Valley
- Potters Field Area – The original area set aside for the burial of the poor
- Old Ladies Home – Site for residents of the Home for the Friendless, a charity set up by Urania Nott, wife of Eliphalet Nott, the first President of Union College.

== Notable structures ==
- Christian Temple and GME (German Methodist Episcopal Church).
- The Haigh mausoleum is adorned with a statue of a dog named Lion. The legend is that after his master died, Lion came to the mausoleum daily where he was cared for by cemetery staff. The statue is in Lion's memory.
- Stanford Mausoleum – The family raised eight children, the most notable being Leland Stanford. In early life Leland was an attorney. He opened an office in Port Washington, Wisconsin, but shortly thereafter a fire destroyed his office and a $3,000 library. Leland decided to head west, where he joined his brothers in business. He made a fortune in the railroad industry, being a principal in the building of the transcontinental railroad. Stanford and his wife Jane founded Stanford University in memory of their son Leland Jr., who died young.
- A Celtic Cross.
- Holland Mausoleum.
- Revolutionary War Memorial.
- The Superintendent's House (1889–1890) and Caretaker's Cottage are listed as contributing buildings to the Historic District on the National Register of Historic Places. The North Terrace Gate, State Street Gate, and Brandywine Avenue Gate are listed as contributing structures.
