= Ernst Julius Berg =

American electrical engineer

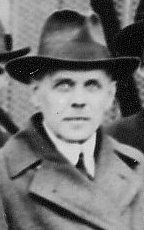
Ernst Julius Berg in 1921

Ernst Julius Berg (9 Feb. 1871 - 1941) was a Swedish-born, American electrical engineer.

== Biography ==
Ernst Julius Berg was born in Östersund, Jämtland County in Sweden. After graduating from the Royal Institute of Technology in Stockholm in 1892, he immigrated to the United States. He began working as an assistant to Charles Proteus Steinmetz at General Electric. He then joined the faculty of electrical engineering at Union College.

In 1909, he became head of electrical engineering department at the University of Illinois. Berg remained as department head until June 1913, when he resigned and returned to his former positions with General Electric Company and with Union College. He was associated with Union College until his death in 1941. A pioneer of radio, he produced the first two-way radio voice program in the United States. In the field of theoretical analysis of electrical circuits, he popularized Oliver Heaviside's technique of operational calculus.

In 1906 he married Gwendoline O'Brien. He is buried in Vale Cemetery in Schenectady, New York.

== Works ==
- 1900: (with Charles Proteus Steinmetz) Theory and calculations of Alternating Current Phenomena, Electrical World and Engineer
- 1908: Electrical energy, its generation, transmission, and utilization, McGraw Hill
- 1916: Electrical Engineering, first course, McGraw Hill
- 1916: Electrical Engineering, advanced course, McGraw Hill
- 1929: Heaviside's Operational Calculus as Applied to Engineering and Physics, McGraw Hill via Internet Archive

== Archive ==
- Special Collections, Schaffer Library, Union College, Schenectady, New York.
- University of Illinois Picture of EJ Berg
