= 124th New York Infantry Regiment =

Orange Blossoms

- Active: September 5, 1862 to June 3, 1865
- Disbanded: June 3, 1865
- Allegiance: (United States) United States; Union
- Branch: United States Army; Union Army
- Type: Infantry
- Nickname: The Orange Blossoms
- Engagements: Battle of Fredericksburg; Battle of Chancellorsville; Battle of Gettysburg; Battle of the Wilderness; Battle of Cold Harbor; Battle of Spotsylvania Court House

Commanders
- Colonel: Augustus van Horne Ellis
- Colonel: Francis M Cummins
- Lt Colonel: Charles H Weygant

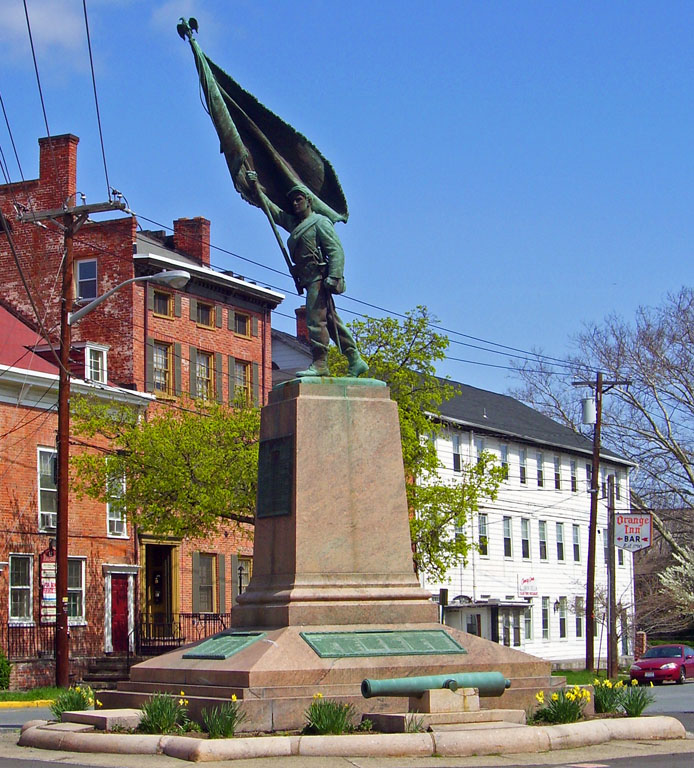
Monument to the 124th in downtown Goshen

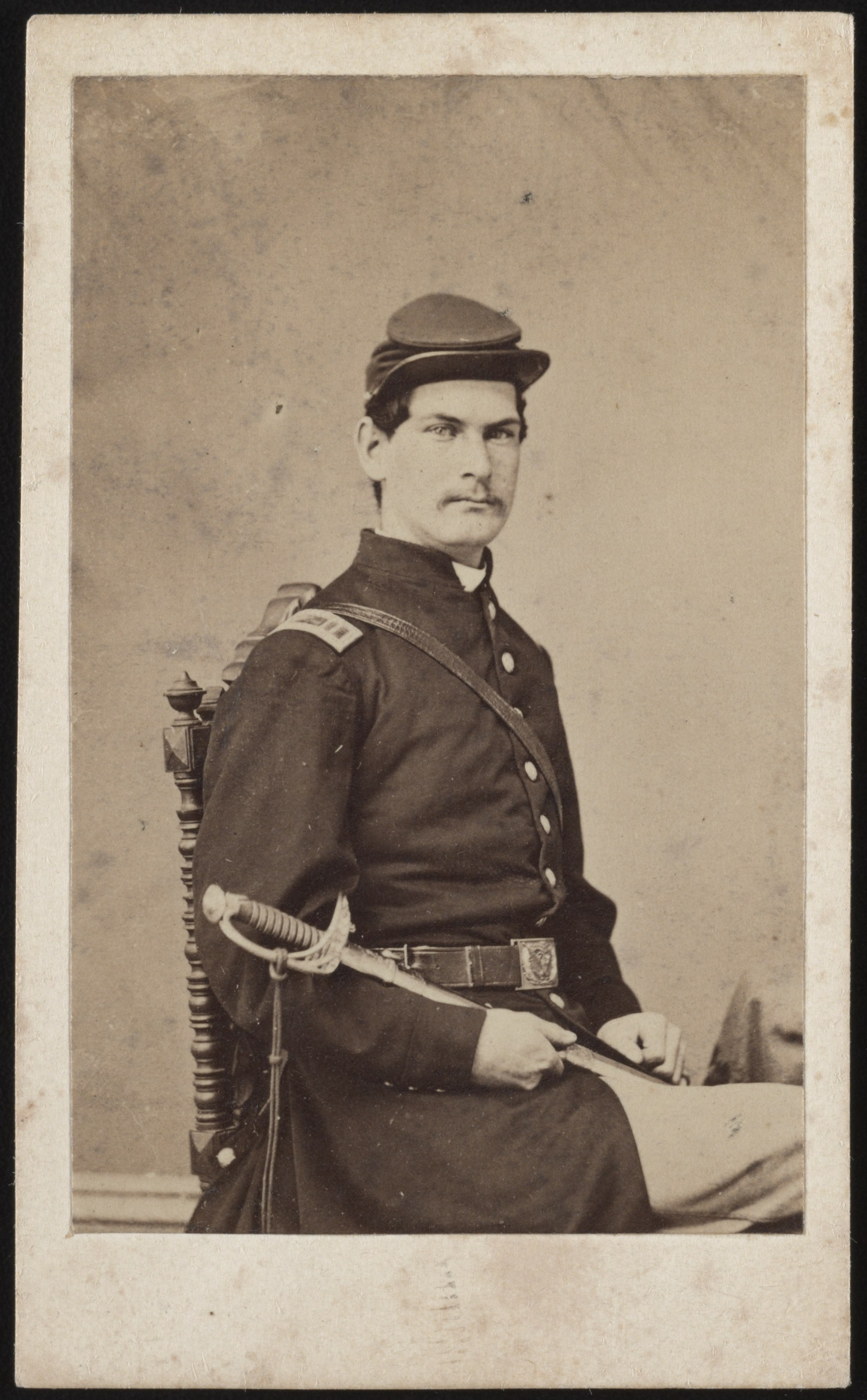
Captain Isaac Nicoll of Co. G, 124th New York Infantry Regiment. From the Liljenquist Family Collection of Civil War Photographs, Prints and Photographs Division, Library of Congress

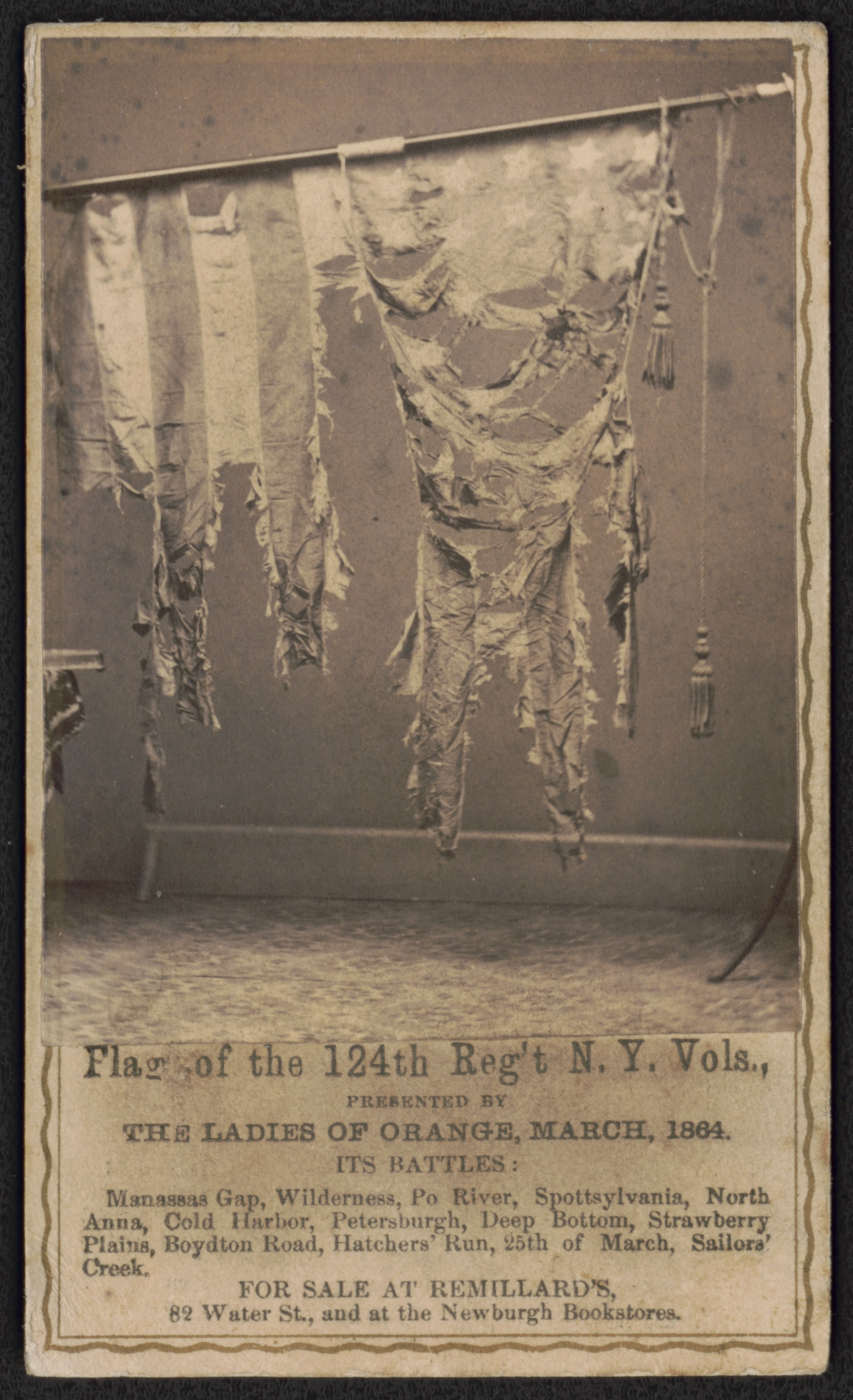
Flag of the 124th New York Volunteer Infantry Regiment

The 124th New York Infantry Regiment, commonly known as the Orange Blossoms, was a volunteer regiment from Orange County, New York, during the American Civil War. Formed in Goshen during the summer of 1862, The unit was officially mustered into United States Service on September 5, 1862, by Col. Augustus van Horne Ellis, the regiment was made up of volunteers from the surrounding towns and a core of veterans from the 71st New York State Militia.

== Organization ==
Volunteers were recruited by town and the 10 companies of the regiment were organized by region:

- A Company: Newburgh, Cornwall, Chester, and Goshen
- B Company: Goshen, Warwick, Florida, and Newburgh
- C Company: Goshen, Cornwall, Newburgh, Monroe, and New Windsor
- D Company: Warwick and Goshen
- E Company: Goshen, Crawford, Otisville, Wallkill, Newburgh, Bullville, New Windsor, Mount Hope, and Port Jervis
- F Company: Port Jervis and Deerpark, New York
- G Company: Washingtonville, Blooming Grove, New Windsor, Monroe, Newburgh, Craigville, and Chester
- H Company: Montgomery, Walden, and Goshen
- I Company: Newburgh and New Windsor
- K Company: Wallkill, Middletown, and Newburgh

== Campaigns ==
The Orange Blossoms' first major engagement was at the Battle of Fredericksburg, in December 1862. Thomas W. Bradley, an Orange Blossom and future United States Representative, was awarded the Medal of Honor for his actions at the Battle of Chancellorsville in 1863. Colonel Ellis was killed at the Battle of Gettysburg, at Houck's Ridge. Three other officers and 31 enlisted men from the regiment also died during the battle.

The Orange Blossoms also took part in the Overland Campaign, taking losses in the Battle of the Wilderness, the Battle of Cold Harbor, and the Spotsylvania Court House. In June 1864 they were at the Siege of Petersburg. In 1865 they fought in the Appomattox Campaign, and were present during the Confederate surrender at the Battle of Appomattox Courthouse.

== Legacy ==
- The 124th has two monuments at Gettysburg; one near the site where Colonel Ellis fell, and one at the unit's location during the defense of Cemetery Ridge.
- "The Orange Blossom Monument" stands on a pedestal in the middle of Main Street in Goshen. The main statue in the monument, called "The Standard Bearer," was designed by Theo Alice Ruggles Kitson and dedicated on September 5, 1907.
- Stephen Crane, who lived in Port Jervis between ages 6–11 and continued to have strong family ties to that area as an adult, is thought to have possibly interacted with Port Jervis area veterans of 124th whose experiences may have influenced his most famous work, The Red Badge of Courage, which is known to depict a fictionalized version of the Battle of Chancellorsville.

=== Medal of Honor recipients ===
- Sergeant Thomas W. Bradley, future United States Representative, was awarded the Medal of Honor for his actions at the Battle of Chancellorsville in 1863.
- Private Archibald C. Freeman, for capturing an enemy battle flag in the Battle of Spotsylvania Court House.
- Corporal George W. Thompkins, for capturing a battle flag in the Battle of Fort Stedman.
- Private (later Corporal) Nathan M. Hallock, for bravery on 15 June 1863 in the Battle of Bristoe Station.
- First Lieutenant Lewis S. Wisner, for bravery during the Battle of Spotsylvania Court House.

== See also ==
- List of New York Civil War regiments
