= Tipton Station =

Historic trolley stop in Pennsylvania

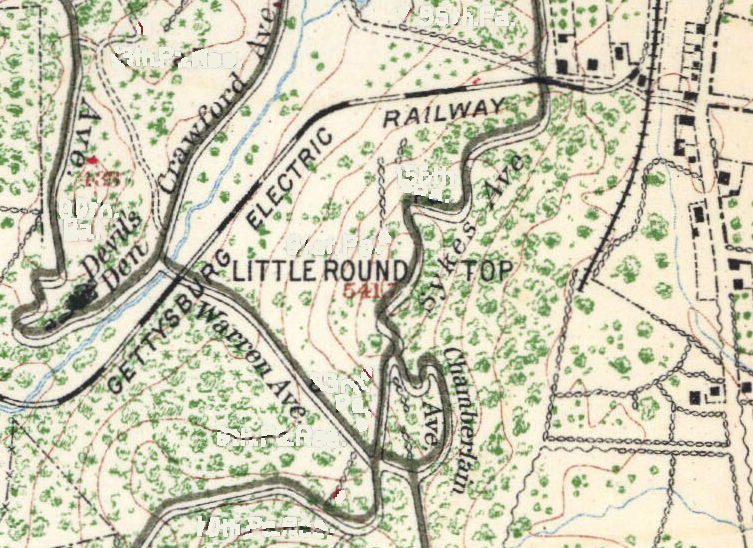
Tipton Station was southeast of Devil's Den along the Gettysburg Electric Railway.

Tipton Station was a Gettysburg Battlefield trolley stop of the Gettysburg Electric Railway for passenger access to Crawford's Glen to the north, Devil's Den (west), and Tipton Park (east). The station was established during the 1894 construction of the end of the trolley line and was near the Devil's Den trolley siding, south of the trolley's Warren Avenue crossing, and northeast of the Plum Run trolley bridge. An uphill trail led southwest to Big Round Top with its 1895 Observation Tower, and the "Slaughter Pen Path and Steps" were built to Devil's Den.

== Tipton Park ==
Tipton Park was an 1894 trolley park with a tintype photographic studio and food stand on private Slaughter Pen land purchased in March 1892 by photographer William H. Tipton, an investor in the 1891 Gettysburg Electric Railway Company. As with Wheat-field Park to the west-northwest and Little Round Top Park (northeast), the park was a commemorative era visitor attraction for battlefield excursions such as the "Christian Endeavor Day" on July 25, 1899. The park property was one of the first trolley right-of-ways acquired by the War Department after the 1896 US Supreme Court decision in the United States v. Gettysburg Electric Ry. Co. case. The 2 tracts of 14.2 acres (0.057 km^{2}) were deeded on December 31, 1901, after a May 7 federal hearing, and the "eating house" was moved to the Little/Big Round Top topographic saddle (operated by "Blind Davy" Weikert). The trolley tracks were removed in 1917 after federal funding was authorized.

In 1934 a Gettysburg Parkitecture comfort station was built at the site (40.116111°N 77.186667°W) and a Plum Run pedestrian bridge was built to it from Devil's Den. In 2004, artifacts associated with Tipton Park were designated as historic district contributing structures (e.g., "Tipton Boundary Marker", and the comfort station and its electrical line were removed c. 2008.
