= James S. Casey =

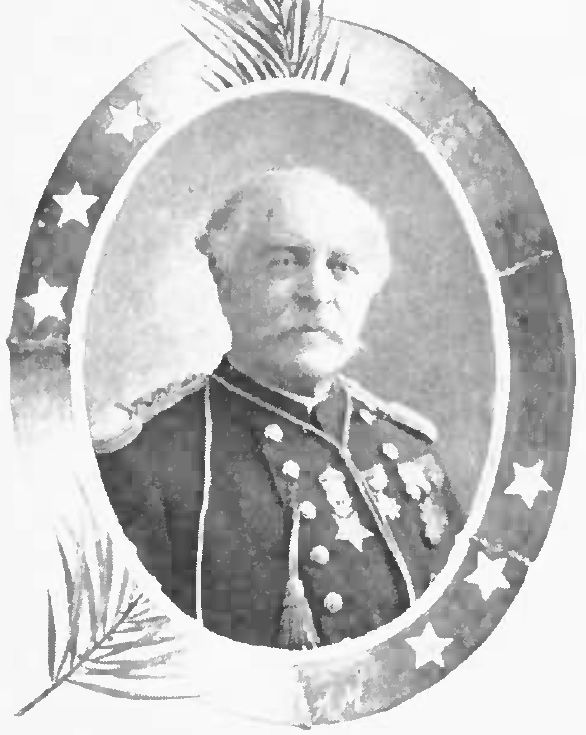
James S. Casey

James Seaman Casey (January 28, 1833 – December 24, 1899) was a US Army officer who received the Medal of Honor for his actions during the Indian Wars. He was born in Philadelphia.

Casey joined the 7th New York Militia in April 1861, just after the outbreak of the American Civil War, and was commissioned as a second lieutenant of the 5th Infantry Regiment in August of the same year. He was promoted to captain in December 1863, and became Commissary of Musters of the Army of the Potomac. He was brevetted major in March 1865 for his actions in the Battle of Fort Stedman. After the war he became a Companion of the New York Commandery of the Military Order of the Loyal Legion of the United States.

After the war, Casey served under colonel Nelson A. Miles in the Black Hills War, later receiving the Medal of Honor for leading his company's assault in the Battle of Wolf Mountain. He was promoted to major of the 17th Infantry Regiment in June 1884 and to lieutenant colonel of the 1st Infantry Regiment in April 1890. He was eventually promoted to colonel of the 22nd Infantry Regiment in January 1895, and retired two years later.

Casey was buried at Vale Cemetery in Schenectady, New York.

== Medal of Honor citation ==
Rank and organization: Captain, Company A, 5th U.S. Infantry. Place and date: At Wolf Mountain, Mont., January 8, 1877. Entered service at: New York City, N.Y. Birth: Philadelphia, Pa. Date of issue: November 27, 1894.

Led his command in a successful charge against superior numbers of the enemy strongly posted.
