= Nathan M. Hallock =

Union army soldier and Medal of Honor recipient

- Born: August 23, 1844; Mount Hope, New York
- Died: March 21, 1903 (aged 58)
- Burial place: Middletown, Orange County, New York
- Military career
- Allegiance: United States of America
- Branch: United States Army
- Rank: Private
- Units: (New York (state)) Company K, 124th New York Volunteer Infantry Regiment
- Conflicts: American Civil War
- Awards: Medal of Honor

Nathan Mullock Hallock (August 23, 1844 – March 21, 1903) was a Union Army soldier in the American Civil War who received the U.S. military's highest decoration, the Medal of Honor.

Hallock was born in Mount Hope, New York, on August 23, 1844. He was awarded the Medal of Honor, for extraordinary heroism shown on June 15, 1863, while serving as a Private with Company K, 124th New York Volunteer Infantry Regiment, at Bristoe Station, Virginia. His Medal of Honor was issued on September 10, 1897.

Hallock died at the age of 58, on March 21, 1903, and was buried at Hillside Cemetery in Middletown, Orange County, New York.

== Medal of Honor citation ==
The President of the United States of America, in the name of Congress, takes pleasure in presenting the Medal of Honor to Private Nathan Mullock Hallock, United States Army, for extraordinary heroism on 15 June 1863, while serving with Company K, 124th New York Infantry, in action at Bristoe Station, Virginia. At imminent peril Private Hallock saved from death or capture a disabled officer of his company by carrying him under a hot musketry fire, to a place of safety.

== See also ==
- 124th New York Volunteer Infantry Regiment
