= Lewis S. Wisner =

American Civil War soldier (1841–1906)

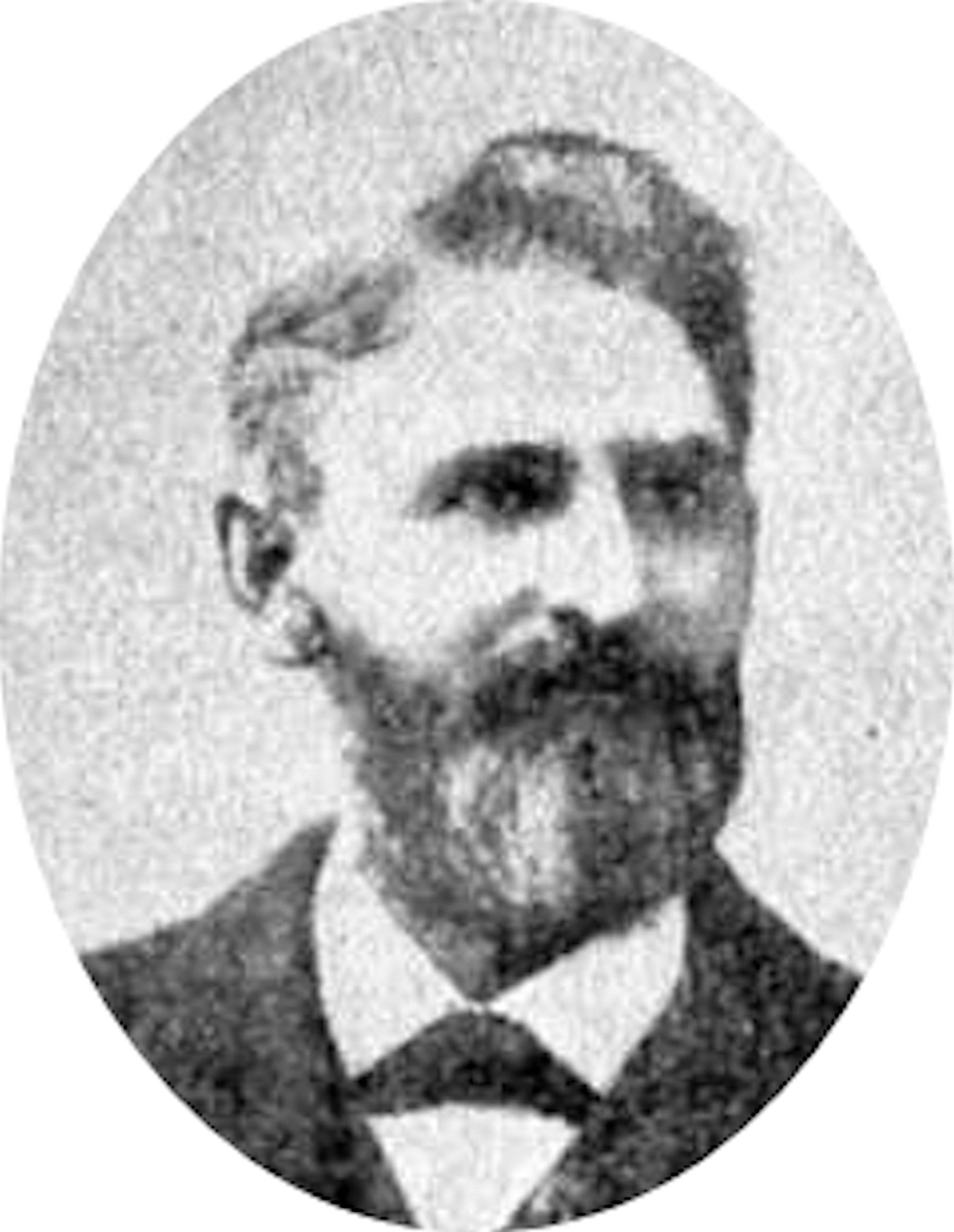
- Born: August 11, 1841; Wallkill, New York, U.S.
- Died: October 6, 1906 (aged 65); Middletown, New York, U.S.
- Burial place: Hillside Cemetery, Middletown, New York
- Military career
- Allegiance: United States of America; Union
- Branch: United States Army; Union Army
- Service years: 1862-1865
- Rank: First Lieutenant
- Unit: 124th New York Infantry Regiment
- Conflicts: American Civil War: Battle of Spotsylvania Court House
- Awards: Medal of Honor

Lewis S. Wisner (August 11, 1841 - October 6, 1906) was an American soldier and recipient of the Medal of Honor who fought in the American Civil War.

== Biography ==
Lewis Wisner was born on August 11, 1841, in Wallkill, New York. After enlisting on August 12, 1862, he served in 124th New York Volunteer Infantry Regiment starting as a sergeant on September 5, 1862. He had reached the rank of First Lieutenant by his Medal of Honor action at the Battle of Spotsylvania Court House, Virginia on May 12, 1864. He was awarded the Medal of Honor on January 2, 1895, for his bravery during the Battle of Spotsylvania Court House.

He died on October 6, 1906, in Middletown, New York, and is now buried in Hillside Cemetery, Middletown, New York.

== Medal of Honor Citation ==
For extraordinary heroism on 12 May 1864, in action at Spotsylvania, Virginia, while serving as an engineer officer voluntarily exposed himself to the enemy's fire.
