= Thomas W. Bradley =

American politician (1844–1920)

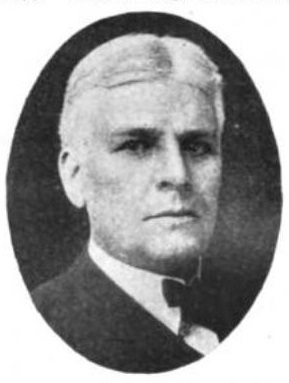

Member of the U.S. House of Representatives from New York's 20th district
- In office March 4, 1903 – March 3, 1913
- Preceded by: George N. Southwick
- Succeeded by: Francis B. Harrison

Member of the New York State Assembly from the 1st district
- In office 1876–1876

Personal details
- Born: Thomas Wilson Bradley; April 6, 1844 Yorkshire, England
- Died: May 30, 1920 (aged 76) Walden, New York
- Resting place: Wallkill Valley Cemetery Walden, New York
- Party: Republican
- Occupation: Military officer, businessman, banker

Military service
- Allegiance: United States of America
- Branch/service: U.S. Army; New York National Guard
- Years of service: 1862–1865
- Rank: Captain; Brevet Major (Army); Colonel (National Guard)
- Unit: (New York (state)) 124th Regiment New York Volunteer Infantry
- Battles/wars: Civil War; Battle of Chancellorsville; Battle of Gettysburg; Battle of Boydton Plank Road
- Awards: Medal of Honor

Thomas Wilson Bradley (April 6, 1844 – May 30, 1920) was a United States representative from New York and a recipient of the United States military's highest decoration, the Medal of Honor.

== Biography ==
Born in Yorkshire, England, Bradley immigrated to the United States in 1846 with his parents, who settled in Walden, New York. He attended school until nine years of age, and then began working for his family's business, the New York Knife Company, as a "shop boy."

Bradley enlisted in the Army from Walden in August 1862, advanced to become a sergeant, and later received a commission. After the Battle of Chancellorsville, he was promoted to captain and became the aide-de-camp to Major General Gershom Mott, 3rd Division, II Corps. He later received a brevet promotion to major of Volunteers. Bradley was wounded at the Battle of Gettysburg, the Battle of the Wilderness, and the Battle of Boydton Plank Road, and was mustered out with his regiment in June 1865. After the war Bradley was active in the Military Order of the Loyal Legion of the United States and other veterans organizations and reunion societies. Bradley also continued his military service as assistant inspector general of the New York National Guard with the rank of lieutenant colonel, later receiving promotion to colonel.

Bradley was a member of the New York State Assembly (Orange Co., 1st D.) in 1876; and a delegate to the 1892, 1896 and 1900 Republican National Conventions.

Bradley was elected as a Republican to the 58th, 59th, 60th, 61st and 62nd United States Congress, holding office from March 4, 1903, to March 4, 1913.

Bradley was a member of the board of directors, vice president and president of the Walden National Bank. He was also a member of the board of directors of the Columbus Trust Company and the Walden Savings Bank. Bradley was employed by the New York Knife Company for more than 50 years, and rose through the company's ranks to become president and treasurer.

Bradley died in Walden, New York, at age 76 and was interred there in Wallkill Valley Cemetery.

== Medal of Honor citation ==
He received the Medal of Honor for actions on May 3, 1863, at the Battle of Chancellorsville.

Rank and organization: Sergeant, Company H, 124th New York Volunteer Infantry Regiment. Place and date: At Chancellorsville, Va., May 3, 1863. Entered service at: Walden, N.Y. Born: April 6, 1844, England. Date of issue: June 10, 1896.

Citation:

Volunteered in response to a call and alone, in the face of a heavy fire of musketry and canister, went and procured ammunition for the use of his comrades.

== See also ==
- List of American Civil War Medal of Honor recipients: A–F

== Notes ==
U.S. House of Representatives
Preceded by George N. Southwick	Member of the U.S. House of Representatives from New York's 20th congressional district 1903–1913	Succeeded by Francis Burton Harrison
