= Devil's Den =

Section of combat during the Second day of the Battle of Gettysburg

Coordinates: 39°47′29.421″N 77°14′32.59″W

- Part of the Gettysburg campaign
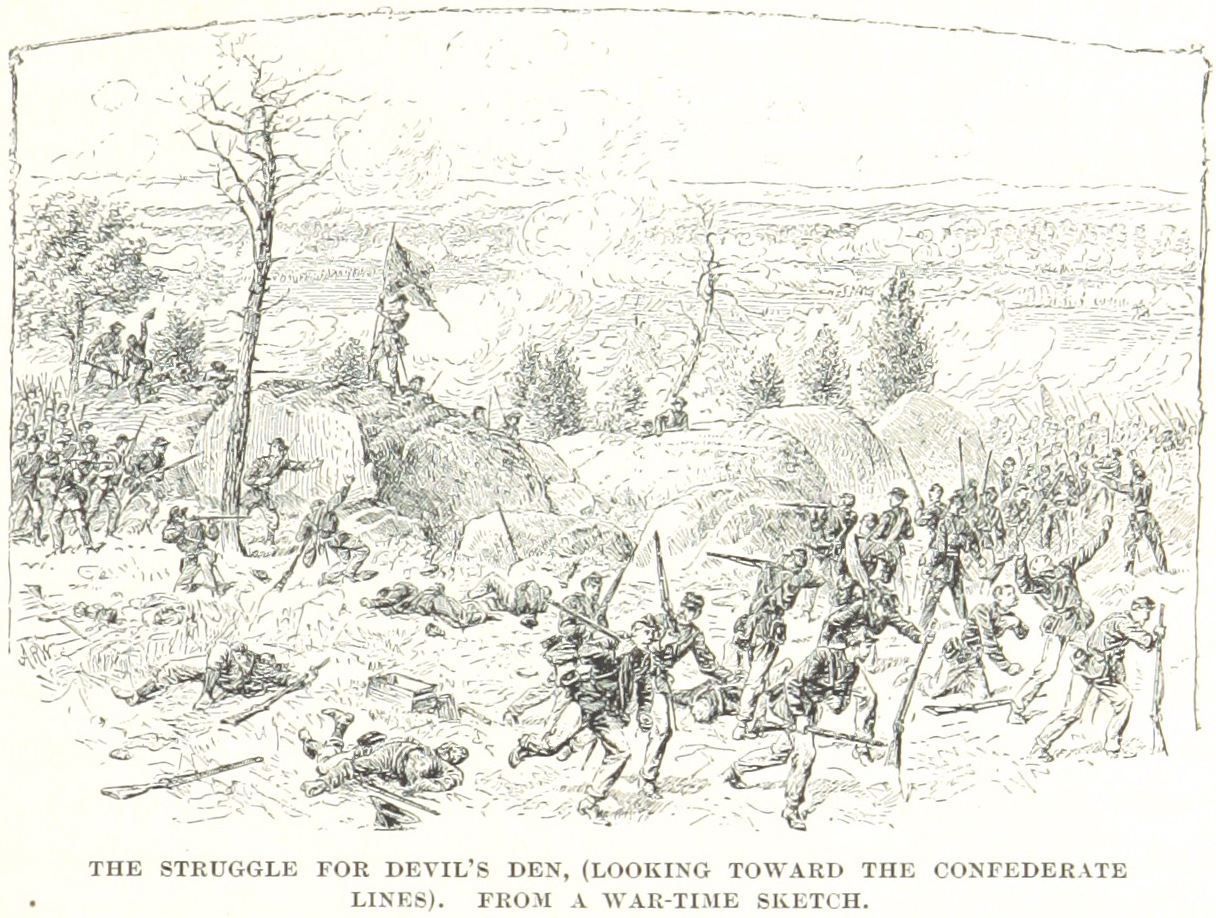
- The struggle for Devil's Den during the battle
Date	July 2, 1863
Location	Gettysburg, Pennsylvania
Result	Union Victory

Belligerents
(United States) Union	Confederate States of America

Commanders and leaders
BG J.H. Hobart Ward (WIA)	Lieutenant General (CSA) James Longstreet; Major General (CSA) John Bell Hood (WIA)

Strength
6 Infantry regiments 2 Sharpshooter companies total: 2,423 engaged	5,525 total

Casualties and losses
138 killed 548 wounded 135 missing 3 Cannons captured total: 821	329 killed 1,107 wounded 378 missing total: 1,815

Devil's Den is a boulder-strewn hill on the south end of Houck's Ridge at Gettysburg Battlefield, used by artillery and sharpshooters on the second day of the 1863 Battle of Gettysburg during the American Civil War. A tourist attraction since the memorial association era, several boulders are worn from foot traffic and the site includes numerous cannons, memorials, and walkways, including a bridge spanning two boulders.

== History ==
Devil's Den was formed with Little Round Top (to the east) and Big Round Top (southeast) by periglacial frost wedging of the igneous landform formed 200 million years ago when a diabase sill intruded through the Triassic Gettysburg plain. The feature acquired its foreboding name prior to the 1863 battle. Throughout the mid-19th century, local residents believed that the crevices between the boulders were home to a large snake. The size of the reptile varied between accounts, but reports ranged from 8 ft (2.4 m) to as large as 15 ft (4.6 m). The snake became known as "The Devil", and thus the area he was believed to inhabit became known as "The Devil's Den". Some soldiers' accounts used the name "Devil's Cave", and a depression on a boulder that collects water resembles a flying horned bat.

=== Battle of Gettysburg ===
On July 2, 1863, Smith's Union battery, with six Napoleon smooth-bores, used the hill to counterfire on Confederate artillery prior to McLaws' Assault at 5:30 pm. Against Hood's Assault that started at 4 pm, Devil's Den was defended by Birney's 1st Division as the far left position from The Peach Orchard Salient of the III Corps. The hill was captured when the "First Texas Regiment, having pressed forward to the crest of the hill and driven the enemy from his battery", and Anderson's Confederates used the hill for the first attack on The Wheatfield. From near the Slaughter Pen, the 40th New York Volunteer Infantry Regiment forced the 2nd & 17th Georgia regiments of Benning's Brigade to retreat to Devil's Den. Confederate sharpshooters were stationed between the rocks to fire upon Union soldiers at Little Round Top, among their victims being General Stephen H. Weed and Lieutenant Charles E. Hazlett. Hazlett's guns counter-fired upon them, and many were killed from the concussion of air.

The 124th NY monument with Ellis statue was dedicated near Devil's Den in 1884. Postbellum avenues were constructed to Devil's Den such as Sickles' Avenue from the west, Crawford Avenue in 1895 (north), and Warren Avenue across Plum Run (east). From 1894 to 1916, the Gettysburg Electric Railway operated on a curve crossing Plum Run (Rock Creek) around the south base of the hill with the Tipton Station providing Devil's Den services. In 1916, a Devil's Den boulder was used as a Satterlee Hospital memorial at Philadelphia's Clark Park.

The nearby 1933 comfort station was demolished in 2009, and its access bridge over Plum Run remains to the east. In 1952, ROTC students conducted a mock battle at the site, and the "Devil's Den Access Committee" was formed in 1988. The site's ID Tablet was designated a Historic District Contributing Structure in 2004, and the Devil's Den barricade is structure WA35 on the Gettysburg National Military Park's List of Classified Structures.

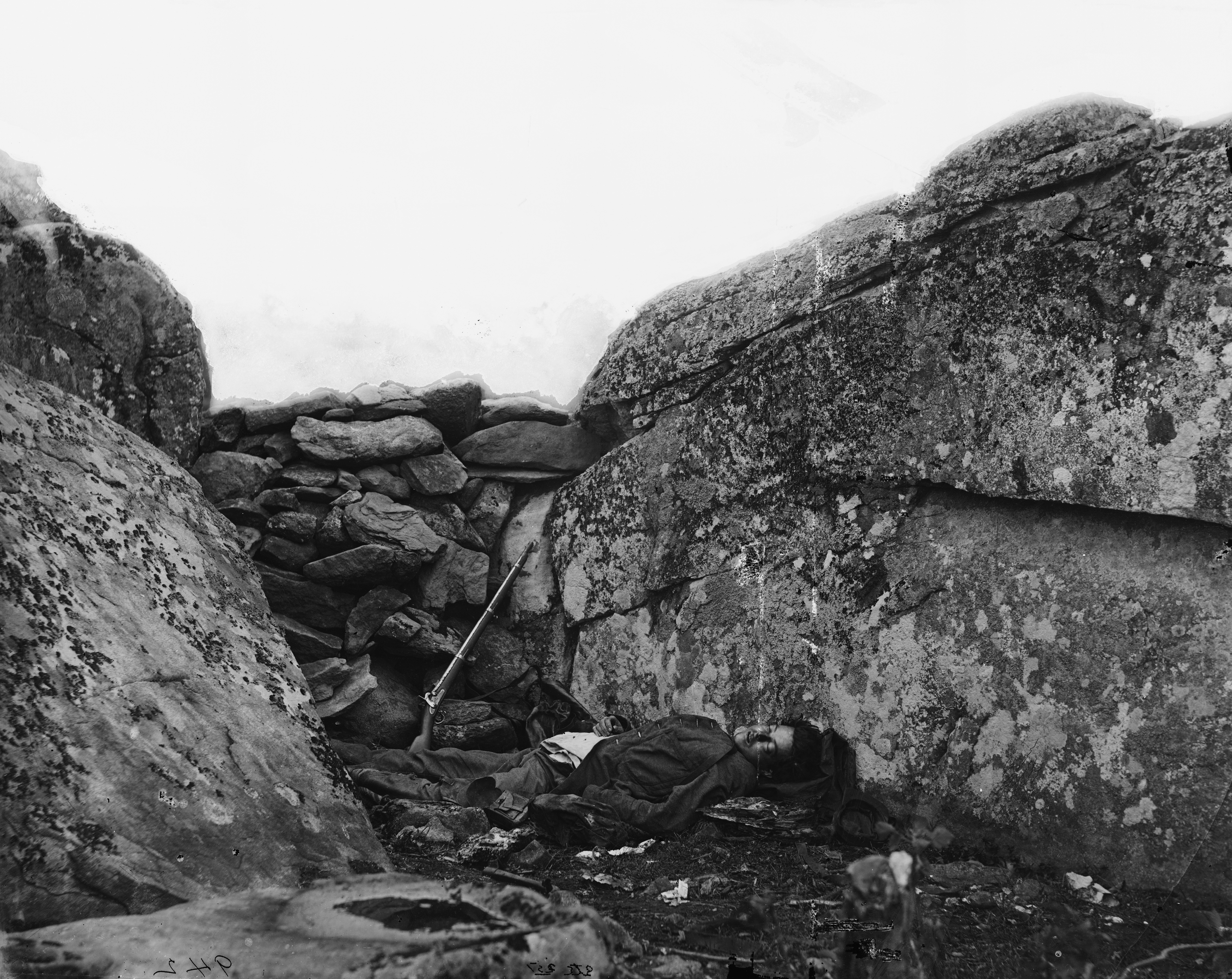
Home of a Rebel Sharpshooter - Post-battle Confederate sharpshooter body staged behind the "Devil's Den barricade" illustrating "a sharpshooter…of Devil's Den" such as the one presumed killed by a percussion of a cannon shot from Little Round Top after Weed and Hazlett had been sniped. Tentatively identified in 2018 as a Georgian soldier.

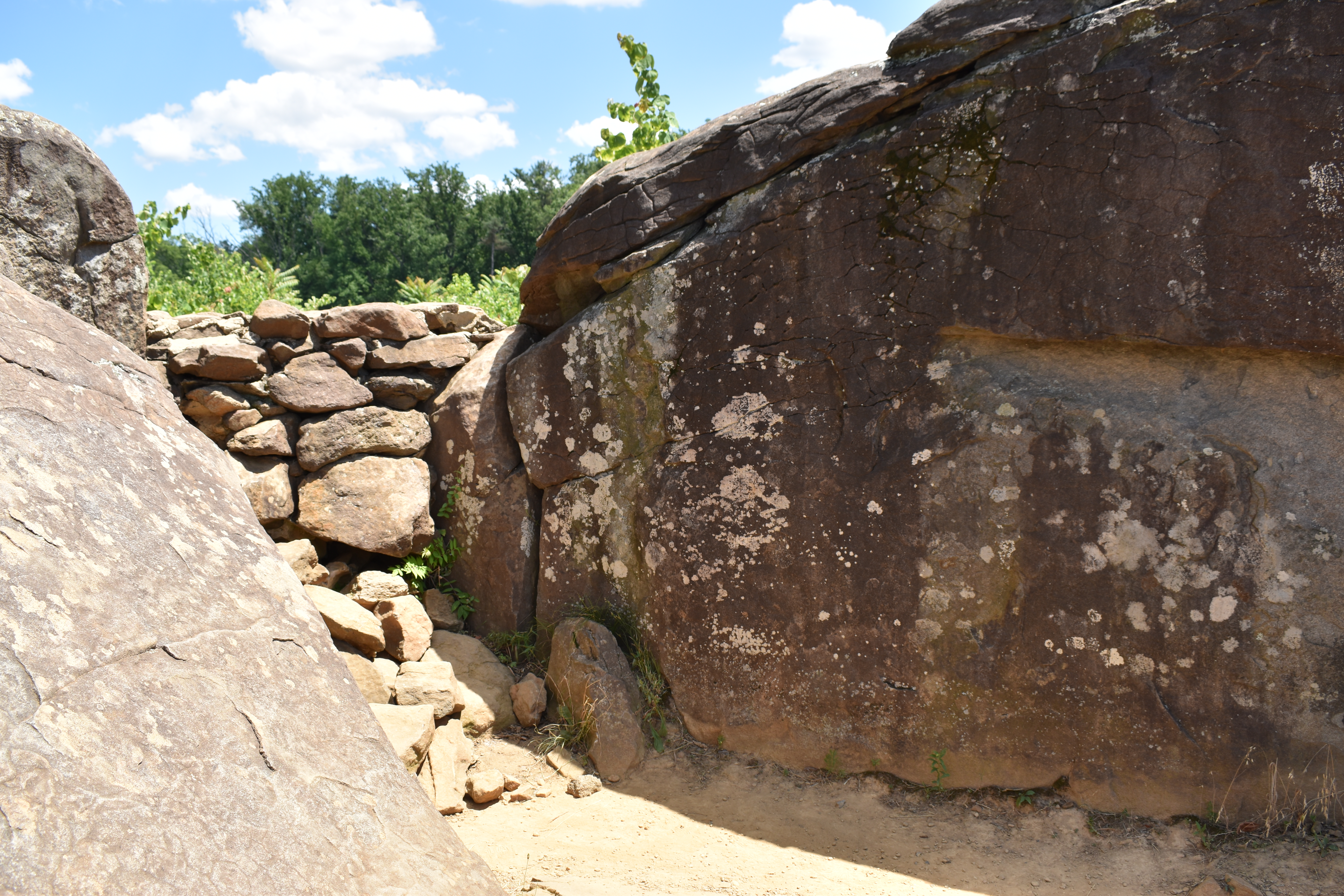
The location of Home of a Rebel Sharpshooter, in July 2020

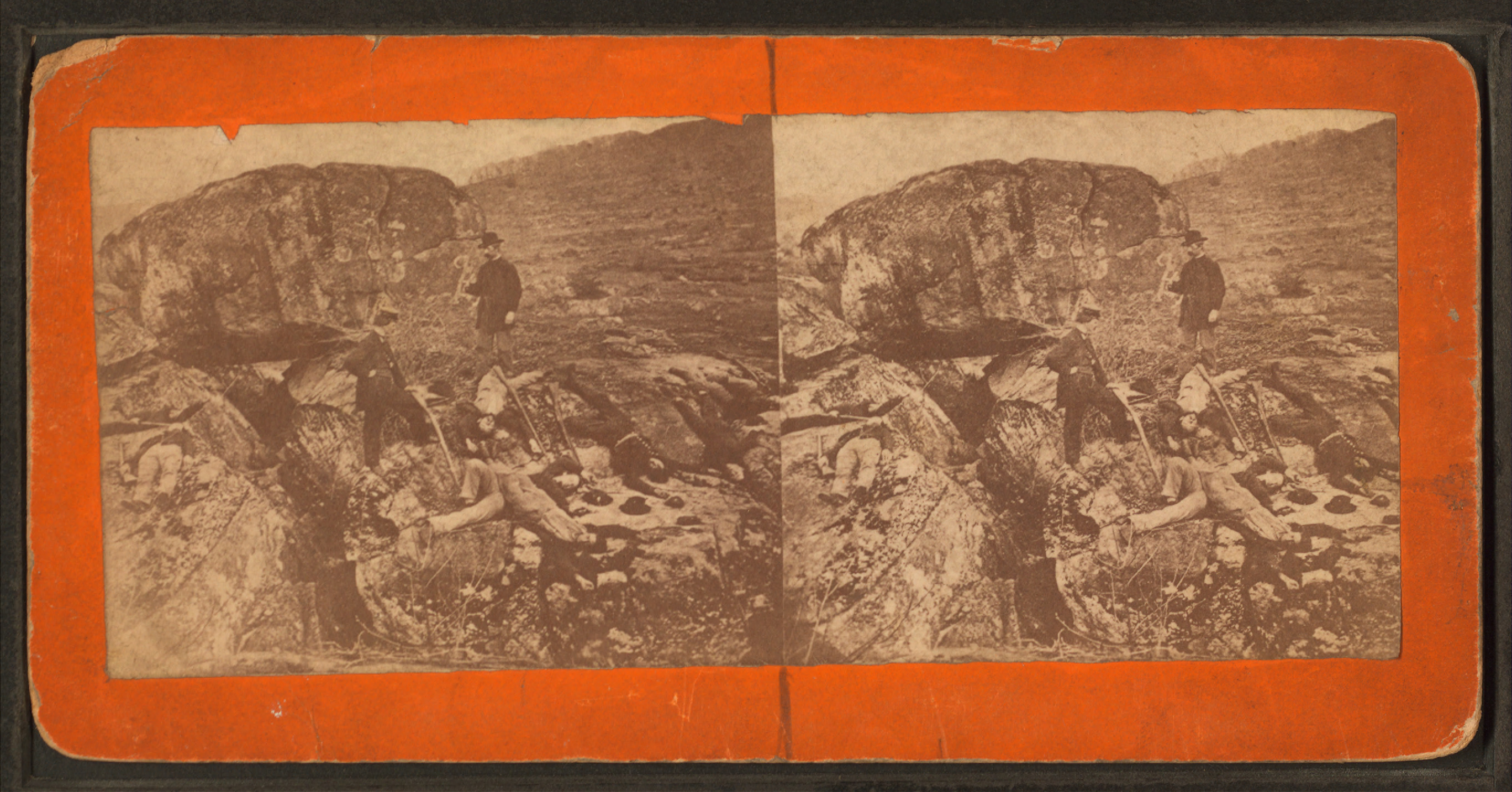
Taken in Devil's Den of PA militiamen playing "Dead" in November 1863!

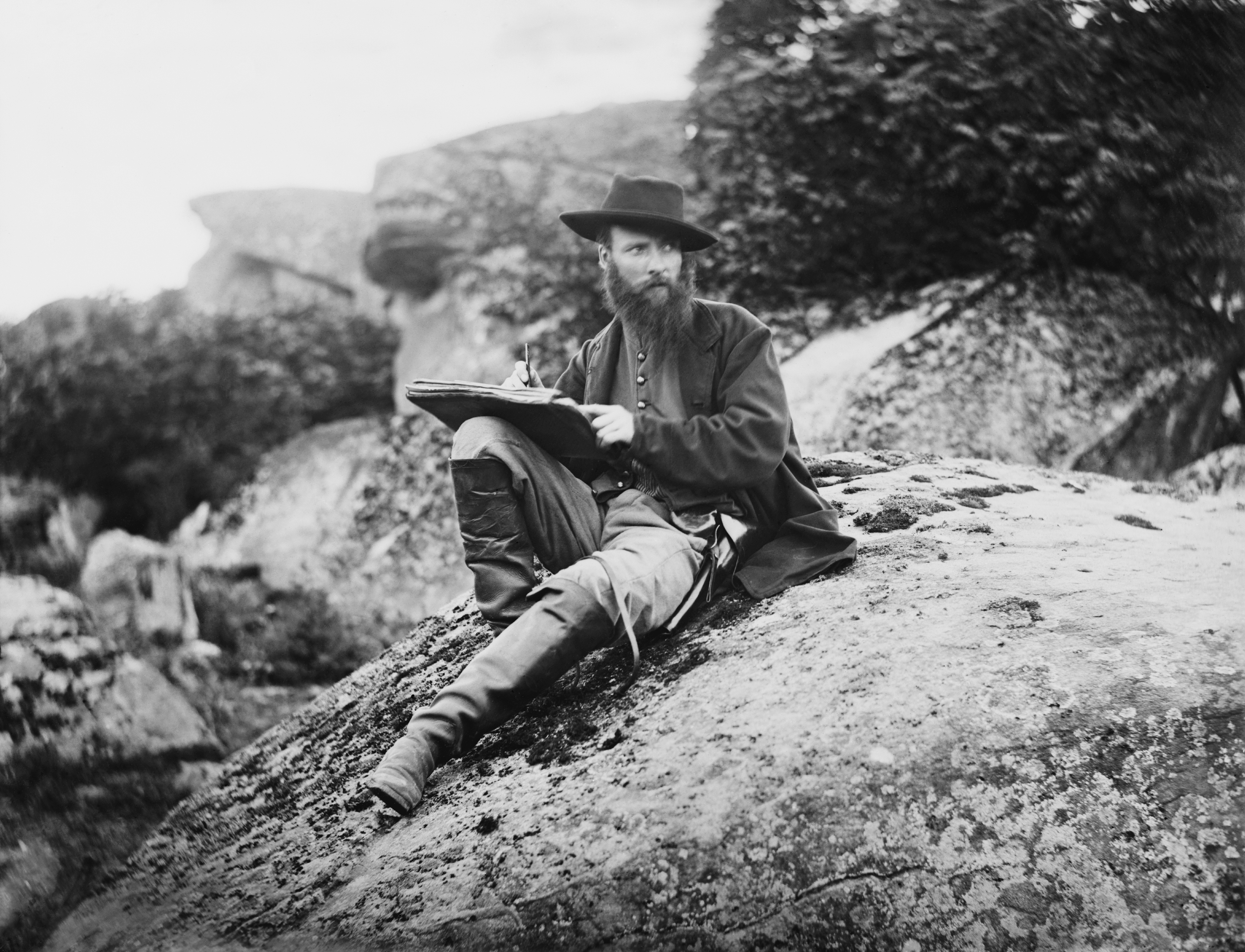
Civil War artist Alfred Waud sketching for the Battle of Gettysburg at Devil's Den.

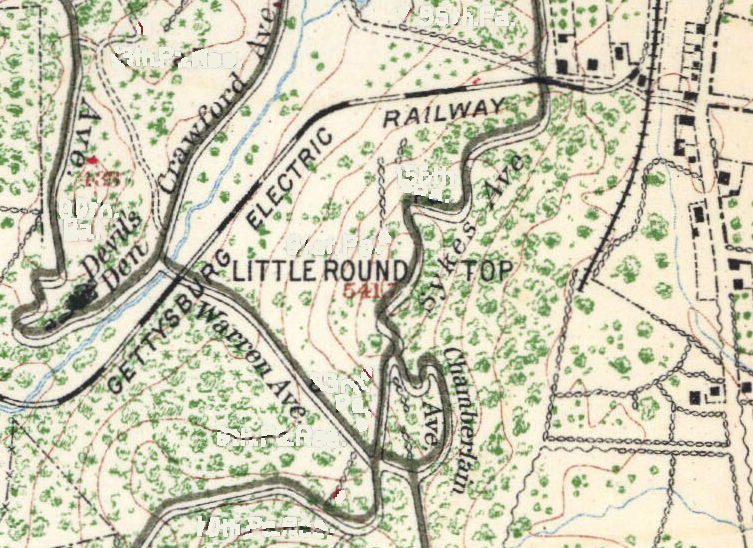
Devil's Den (left) is across Sickles Av & Plum Run from the trolley railbed.

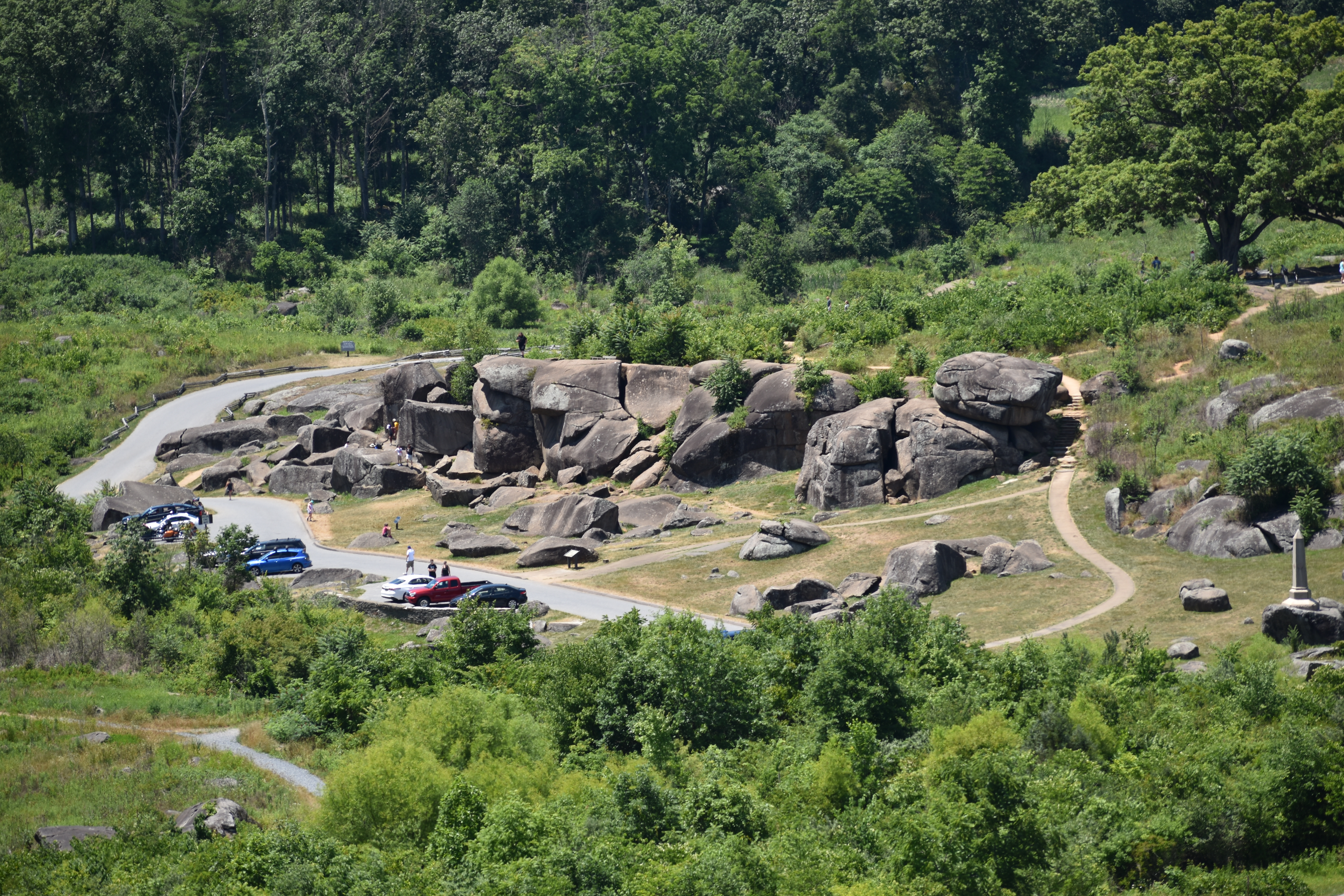
A view of Devil's Den from Little Round Top, in 2020.
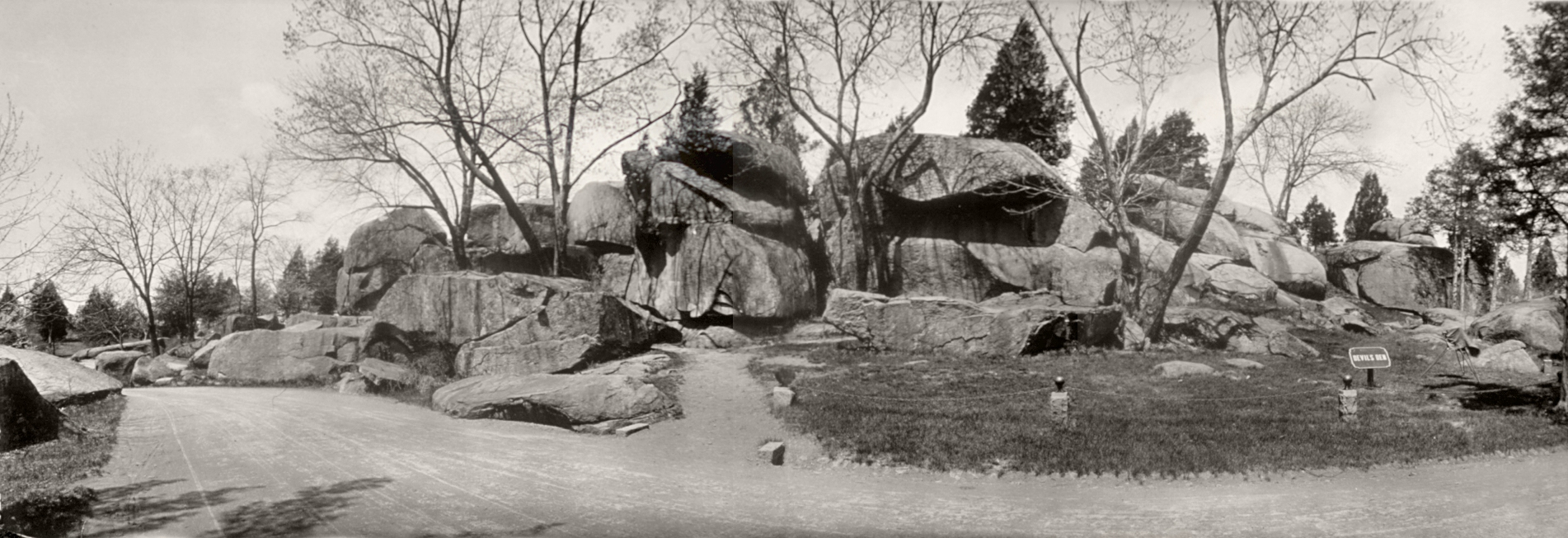
1909 photo of Devil's Den
