= Archibald C. Freeman =

American soldier

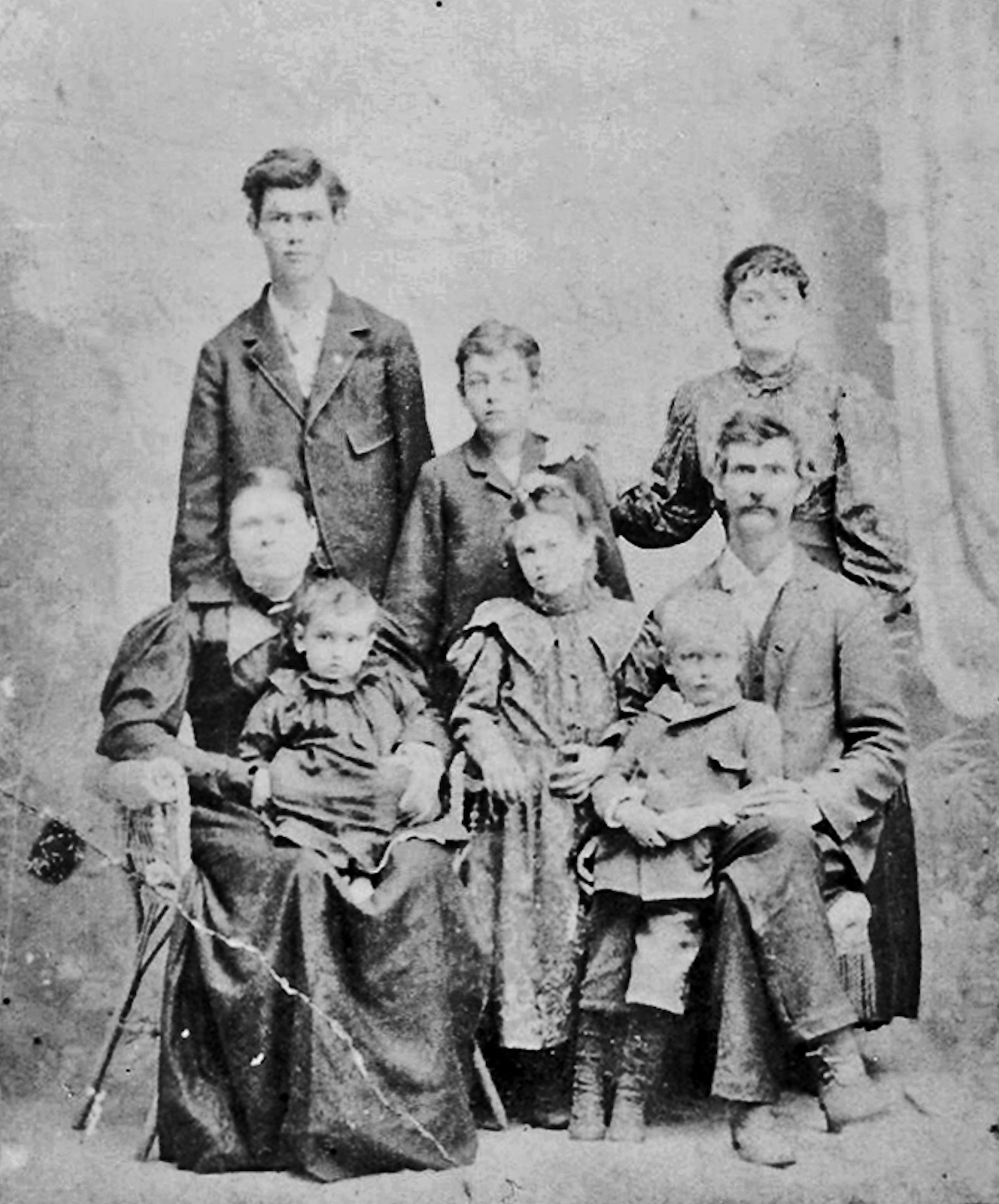
- Archibald Freeman with his family c1896 1st Row L-R: Orena Anna McBay Freeman, Marvin/Marion Freeman, Bet Freeman, Felix Gibbs Freeman, Archibald Freeman; 2nd Row, L-R: Frank F Freeman, Archibald Bertrand Freeman, Margaret "Maggie" Freeman
- Born: August 13, 1847; Newburgh, New York, U.S.
- Died: January 26, 1918 (aged 70)
- Military career
- Allegiance: United States
- Branch: United States Army; Union Army
- Service years: 1862–1865
- Rank: Sergeant
- Unit: 124th New York Volunteer Infantry Regiment
- Conflicts: Battle of Spotsylvania Court House
- Awards: Medal of Honor

Archibald C. Freeman (August 13, 1847 – January 26, 1918) was an American soldier who received the Medal of Honor for valor during the American Civil War.

== Biography ==
Freeman joined the Army from Newburgh, New York, in July 1862, claiming to be 18 years old. He served in the 124th New York Infantry and was promoted to Corporal less than two weeks prior to his MOH action. He received the Medal of Honor on December 1, 1864, for his actions at the Battle of Spotsylvania Court House, and was mustered out with his regiment in June 1865.

After the war, he moved to Limestone County, Texas, where he married Orena A. McBay.

They seem to have had six children, two daughters, and four sons. They had five of their children that lived to adulthood.

== Medal of Honor citation ==
Citation:

The President of the United States of America, in the name of Congress, takes pleasure in presenting the Medal of Honor to Private Archibald Freeman, United States Army, for extraordinary heroism on 12 May 1864, while serving with Company E, 124th New York Infantry, in action at Spotsylvania, Virginia, for capture of flag of 17th Louisiana (Confederate States of America).

== See also ==
- List of American Civil War Medal of Honor recipients: A-F
