= William H. Tipton =

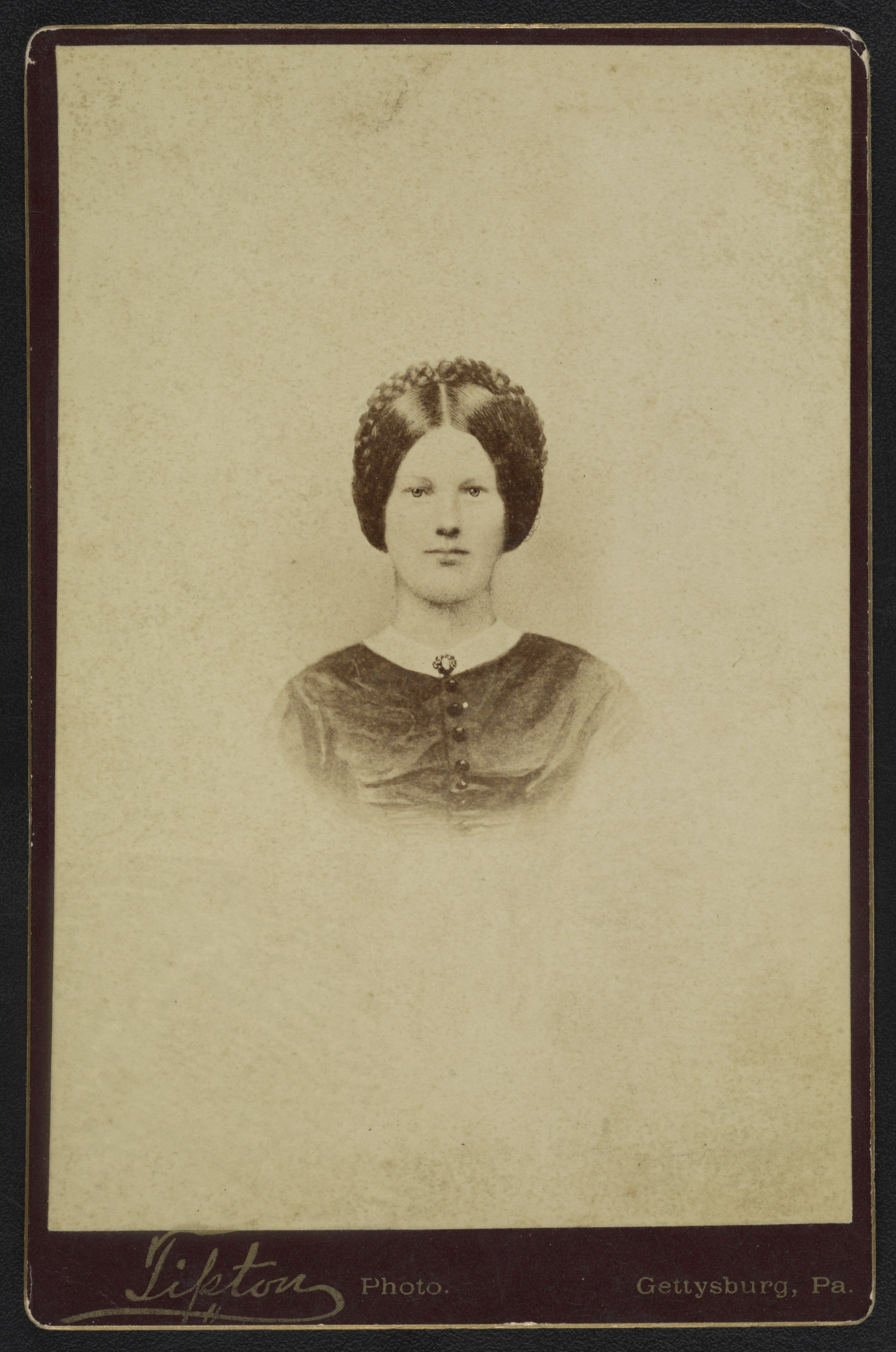
Tipton's portrait of Gettysburg casualty Jennie Wade

William Henry Tipton (August 5, 1850 – September 20, 1929) was a noted American photographer of the second half of the 19th century, most noted for his extensive early photography of the Gettysburg Battlefield and the borough of Gettysburg, Pennsylvania.

== Biography ==
Tipton was born in Gettysburg, Pennsylvania to Solomon Tipton and Elizabeth Kitzmiller; he was a firstborn child and had seven siblings. From the age of twelve, Tipton studied photography as the apprentice of Charles John Tyson (1838-1906) and Isaac G. Tyson (1833-1913), who were among the earliest Gettysburg photographers. After the Battle of Gettysburg Tipton allegedly helped Mathew Brady to photograph the battlefield.

In 1868, Tipton partnered with Robert A. Myers and they purchased the Tysons Brothers' studio and went into photography business for themselves as Tipton and Myers Excelsior Gallery. In 1880, Myers sold his share and Tipton renamed the business as W. H. Tipton and Company.

He became quite popular as an outdoor portrait photographer, taking thousands of photographs of visitors to the Gettysburg battlefield, where he established Tipton Park to encourage tourism. By 1888, he had produced an estimated 5,000 views of the battlefield of Gettysburg and more than 100,000 portraits.

He eventually became one of America's best known landscape and portrait photographers, but images of Civil War battlefields remained a mainstay, including Gettysburg, Antietam, Fredericksburg, Spotsylvania, Petersburg, Chancellorsville, and Harpers Ferry.

Tipton served on Gettysburg's town council and also in the Pennsylvania House of Representatives.

He died of dropsy and is interred in Evergreen Cemetery in Gettysburg.

== Family ==
In 1871, Tipton married Mary Elizabeth Little (1852-1921) and they had four children.
