= Gettysburg micropolitan area =

Coordinates: 39.830508°N 77.23338°W

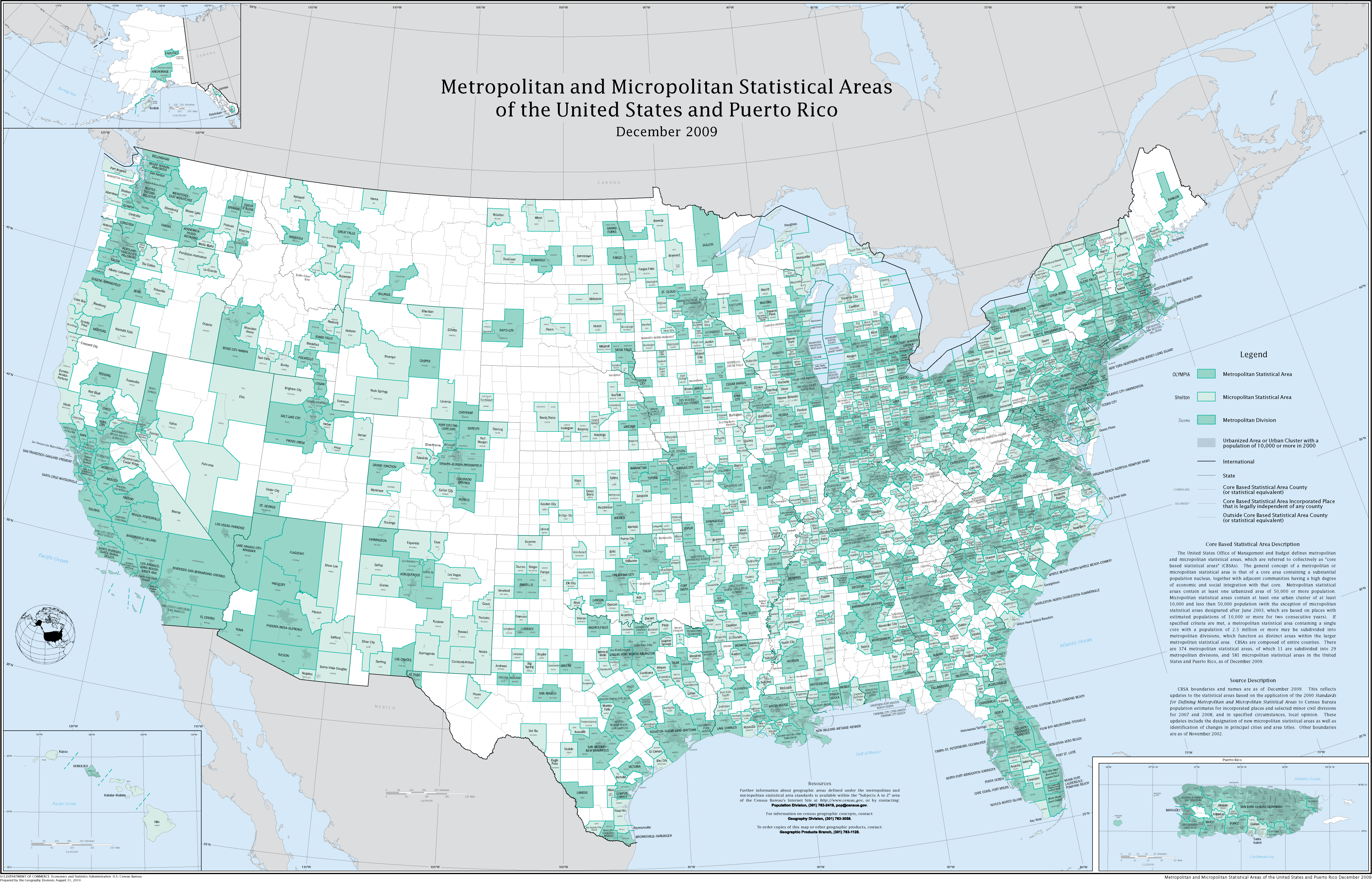
An enlargeable map of the 955 Core based statistical areas (CBSAs) of the United States and Puerto Rico; the 374 Metropolitan statistical areas (MSAs) are shown in medium green. The 581 Micropolitan statistical areas (μSAs) are shown in light green.

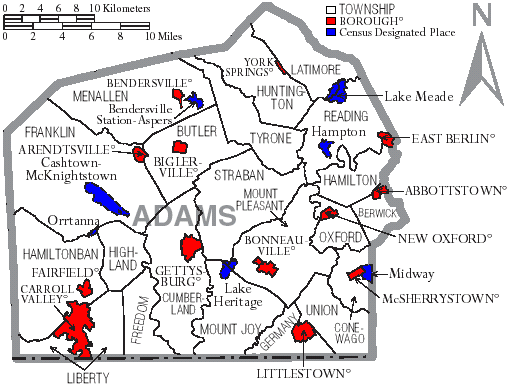
Map of Adams County, Pennsylvania with municipal labels showing boroughs (red), townships (white), and census-designated places (blue)

The Gettysburg, PA Micropolitan Statistical Area is a small urban area of southern Pennsylvania. Adams County makes up the entire statistical area. The population is 101,407 as of the 2010 census. The statistical area ranks 42nd in the U.S., and fourth-largest among Pennsylvania's micropolitan areas behind East Stroudsburg, Chambersburg, and Pottsville.

== Cities ==
Map of Pennsylvania highlighting Adams County

- None

== Towns ==
Major Boroughs and CDPs

- Gettysburg Borough Pop. 7,620
- Littlestown Borough Pop. 4,434
- Carroll Valley Borough Pop. 3,876
- McSherrystown Borough Pop. 3,038
- Lake Meade CDP Pop. 2,563
- Midway CDP Pop. 2,125
- Bonneauville Borough Pop. 1,800
- New Oxford Borough Pop. 1,783
- East Berlin Borough Pop. 1,521
- Lake Heritage CDP Pop. 1,333
- Biglerville Borough Pop. 1,200
- Abbottstown Borough Pop. 1,011

== See also ==
- List of micropolitan statistical areas
