= Bittinger =

Bittinger may refer to:

- Bittinger (surname)
- Bittinger, Maryland, an unincorporated community in Garrett County, Maryland, United States
- Bittinger, Pennsylvania, an unincorporated community in Adams County, Pennsylvania, United States
