= Adams County, Pennsylvania =

County in Pennsylvania, United States

- County
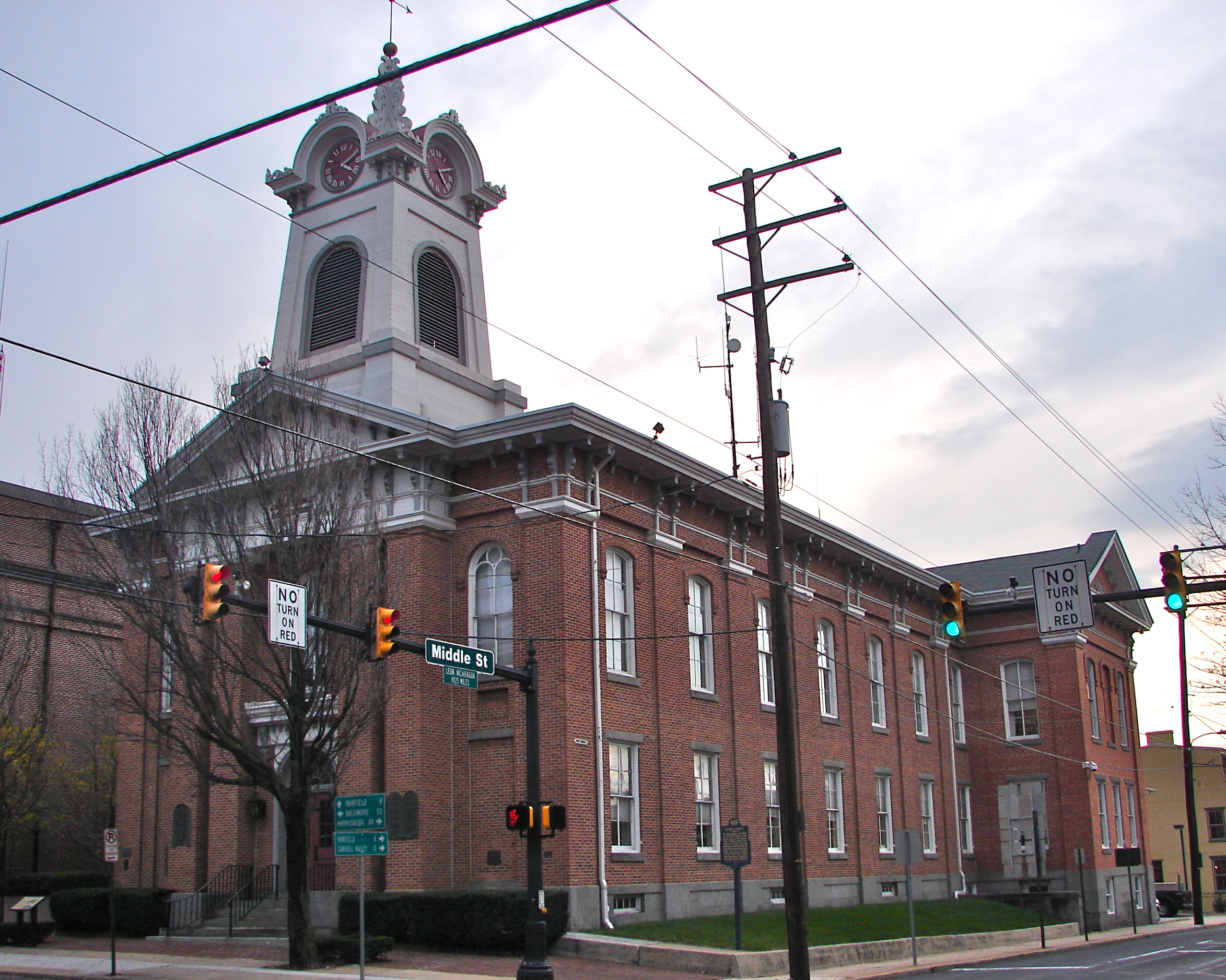
- Adams County Courthouse in Gettysburg

- Seal

- Location within the U.S. state of Pennsylvania
- Coordinates: 39°52′N 77°13′W
- Country: United States
- State: Pennsylvania
- Founded: January 22, 1800
- Named for: John Adams
- Seat: Gettysburg
- Largest borough: Gettysburg

Area
  - Total: 522 sq mi (1,350 km^{2})
  - Land: 519 sq mi (1,340 km^{2})
  - Water: 3.1 sq mi (8.0 km^{2}) 0.6%

Population (2020)
  - Total: 103,852
  - Estimate (2025): 107,594 ▲
  - Density: 200/sq mi (77/km^{2})
- Time zone: UTC−5 (Eastern)
  - Summer (DST): UTC−4 (EDT)
- Congressional district: 13th
- Website: www.adamscountypa.gov

Pennsylvania Historical Marker
- Type: City
- Designated: November 6, 1982

Adams County is a county in the Commonwealth of Pennsylvania. As of the 2020 census, the population was 103,852. Its county seat is Gettysburg. The county was created on January 22, 1800, from part of York County, and was named for John Adams, the second President of the United States.

Between July 1 and July 3, 1863, the Battle of Gettysburg, the bloodiest and most significant battle of the American Civil War, was fought near Gettysburg. As a result, Adams County is a center for Civil War-related tourism. Adams County comprises the Gettysburg metropolitan statistical area, which is also included in the Harrisburg–York–Lebanon combined statistical area. The county is part of the South Central region of the commonwealth. (Note: Includes Lancaster, York, Berks, Dauphin, Cumberland, Franklin, Lebanon, Adams and Perry Counties)

== Geography ==
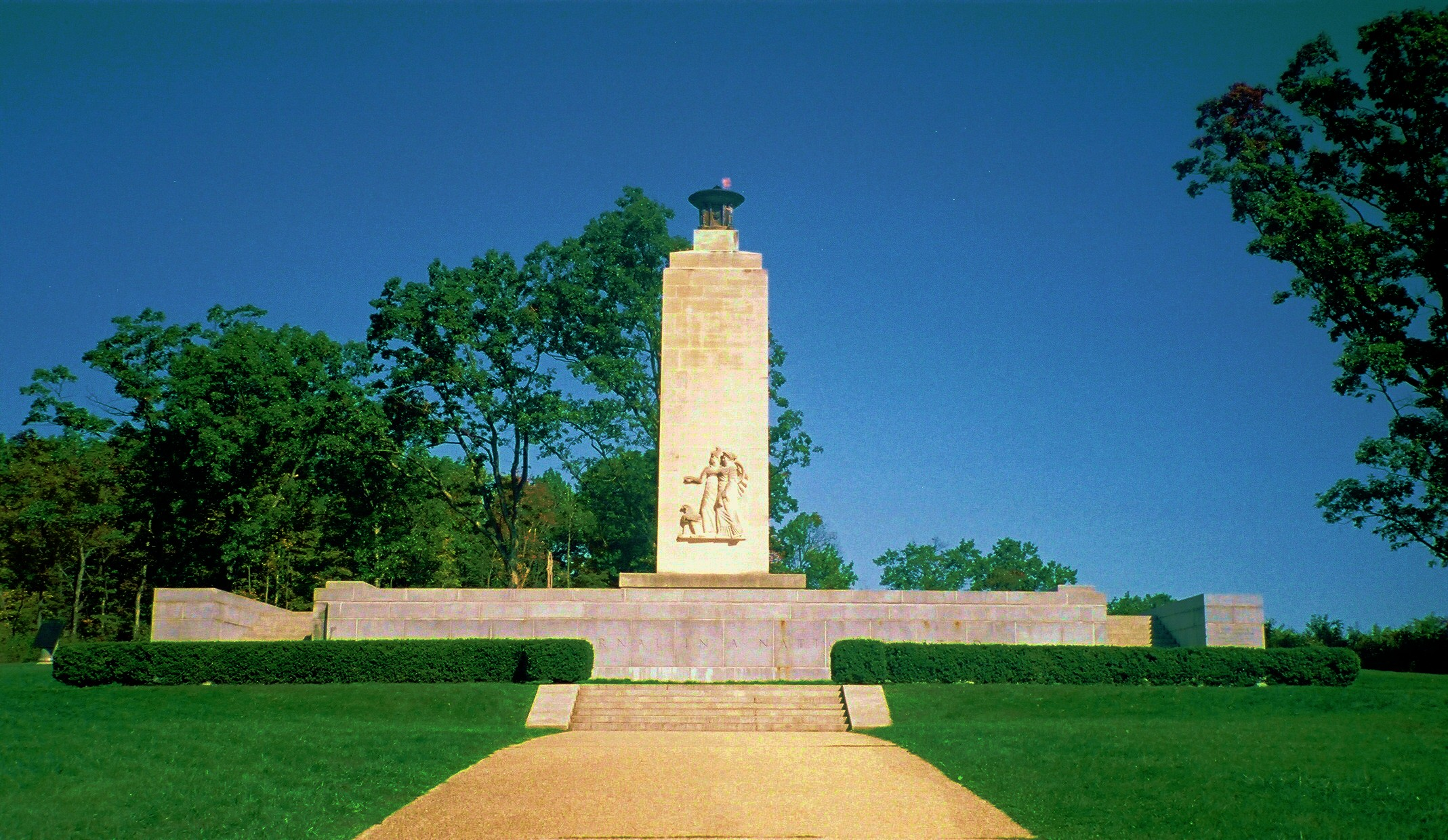
The Eternal Light Peace Memorial at Gettysburg Battlefield

According to the U.S. Census Bureau, the county has a total area of 522 square miles (1,350 km^{2}), of which 519 square miles (1,340 km^{2}) is land and 3.1 square miles (8.0 km^{2}) (0.6%) is water. The Borough of Gettysburg is located at the center of Adams County. This county seat community is surrounded on three sides by the Gettysburg National Military Park (GNMP). The Eisenhower National Historic Site adjoins GNMP on its southwestern edge. Most of Adams County's rural landscapes and its mid-19th century roadway pattern remain intact today. Thirteen historic roadways converge at or near Gettysburg Borough. Two circular rings of towns surround Gettysburg; the first is typically found at a distance of approximately 7 miles (11 km) from Gettysburg. The second ring is found at a distance of 12 to 15 miles (24 km) from the county seat. This "spokes and wheel" pattern is one of the few examples of Central Place Theory in the Eastern United States.

The county is in the watershed of the Chesapeake Bay and is drained by the Susquehanna and Potomac Rivers.

=== Adjacent counties ===
Cumberland
| | | north |
| Franklin | west | self | east | York |
| Frederick MD | southwest | | southeast | Carroll |

=== National protected areas ===
- Eisenhower National Historic Site
- Gettysburg National Military Park

=== Climate ===
Adams has a hot-summer humid continental climate (Dfa).

Climate data for Gettysburg, Pennsylvania
| Month | Jan | Feb | Mar | Apr | May | Jun | Jul | Aug | Sep | Oct | Nov | Dec | Year |
|---|---|---|---|---|---|---|---|---|---|---|---|---|---|
| Record high °F (°C) | 72 (22) | 78 (26) | 87 (31) | 93 (34) | 93 (34) | 98 (37) | 104 (40) | 104 (40) | 98 (37) | 92 (33) | 83 (28) | 79 (26) | 104 (40) |
| Mean daily maximum °F (°C) | 39 (4) | 43 (6) | 52 (11) | 64 (18) | 73 (23) | 82 (28) | 86 (30) | 84 (29) | 77 (25) | 66 (19) | 55 (13) | 43 (6) | 64 (18) |
| Mean daily minimum °F (°C) | 21 (−6) | 23 (−5) | 30 (−1) | 40 (4) | 49 (9) | 58 (14) | 63 (17) | 61 (16) | 53 (12) | 41 (5) | 33 (1) | 25 (−4) | 41 (5) |
| Record low °F (°C) | −25 (−32) | −14 (−26) | 0 (−18) | 16 (−9) | 27 (−3) | 35 (2) | 43 (6) | 35 (2) | 31 (−1) | 20 (−7) | 12 (−11) | −5 (−21) | −25 (−32) |
| Average precipitation inches (mm) | 3.24 (82) | 3.00 (76) | 3.54 (90) | 3.53 (90) | 4.33 (110) | 4.29 (109) | 3.36 (85) | 3.81 (97) | 4.22 (107) | 3.28 (83) | 3.40 (86) | 3.23 (82) | 43.23 (1,097) |
Source: The Weather Channel

== Recreation ==
Recreational areas of Adams County include

- Caledonia State Park, state park named for an iron furnace that was owned by Thaddeus Stevens. Most of this park is in neighboring Franklin County, but a portion of it extends into Adams. It is near U.S. Route 30 between Chambersburg and Gettysburg.
- Eisenhower National Historic Site, the home and farm of 34th President of the United States Dwight D. Eisenhower.
- Gettysburg Battlefield, Civil War battlefield fought July 1–3, 1863
- Journey Through Hallowed Ground National Heritage Area, federally designated National Heritage Area in Maryland, Pennsylvania, Virginia, and West Virginia.
- McPherson Ridge, landform used during the Battle of Gettysburg
- Michaux State Forest
- Pennsylvania State Game Lands Number 249, providing hunting, trapping and other activities.
- Strawberry Hill Nature Preserve

== Government ==
=== Commissioners ===
Adams County is administered by a three-person board of commissioners, who serve four-year terms. Elections occur in the odd-numbered years that precede U.S. presidential elections, with the most recent election falling in 2023. All three commissioners are chosen in the same election, and voters may vote for no more than two of the candidates. The commissioners are responsible for the management of the fiscal and administrative functions of the county.

| Official | Party | Term ends |
|---|---|---|
| Randy Phiel | Republican | 2027 |
| Jim Martin | Republican | 2027 |
| Marty Qually | Democratic | 2027 |

=== Elected county officials ===
As of the May 2024

| Office | Official | Party | Term ends |
|---|---|---|---|
| Clerk of Courts | Kelly A. Lawver | Republican | 2025 |
| Controller | Tammy Myers | Republican | 2027 |
| Coroner | Francis Dutrow | Republican | 2027 |
| Treasurer | Chrissy Redding | Republican | 2025 |
| District Attorney | Brian Sinnett | Republican | 2027 |
| Prothonotary | Beverly Boyd | Republican | 2027 |
| Recorder of Deeds and Register of Wills | Karen Heflin | Republican | 2027 |
| Sheriff | James W. Muller | Republican | 2025 |

== Politics ==
Presidential politics

Adams is a consistently Republican county, like most of South Central Pennsylvania. In 2020, Donald Trump carried the county with 66.3% of the vote to Joe Biden's 32.2%. In 2016, Democratic nominee Hillary Clinton only received 29.6% of the vote, the lowest share any Democrat had received in the county since George McGovern 44 years prior. No Democratic presidential candidate has won Adams County since Lyndon Johnson's 1964 landslide. However, Democratic strength exists in Gettysburg, which Biden carried 63%-35%.

United States presidential election results for Adams County, Pennsylvania
| Year | Republican | | Democratic | | Third party(ies) | |
| Year | No. | % | No. | % | No. | % |
|---|---|---|---|---|---|---|
| 1880 | 3,137 | 45.08% | 3,752 | 53.92% | 69 | 0.99% |
| 1884 | 3,080 | 46.15% | 3,530 | 52.89% | 64 | 0.96% |
| 1888 | 3,371 | 46.54% | 3,794 | 52.38% | 78 | 1.08% |
| 1892 | 3,384 | 47.20% | 3,716 | 51.83% | 70 | 0.98% |
| 1896 | 4,170 | 50.95% | 3,814 | 46.60% | 201 | 2.46% |
| 1900 | 3,718 | 47.47% | 3,967 | 50.65% | 147 | 1.88% |
| 1904 | 4,017 | 50.65% | 3,812 | 48.06% | 102 | 1.29% |
| 1908 | 3,685 | 46.95% | 4,034 | 51.40% | 130 | 1.66% |
| 1912 | 819 | 11.36% | 3,682 | 51.07% | 2,709 | 37.57% |
| 1916 | 3,290 | 43.76% | 3,963 | 52.71% | 266 | 3.54% |
| 1920 | 5,323 | 56.94% | 3,852 | 41.20% | 174 | 1.86% |
| 1924 | 5,778 | 52.92% | 4,840 | 44.33% | 300 | 2.75% |
| 1928 | 9,656 | 67.29% | 4,635 | 32.30% | 58 | 0.40% |
| 1932 | 6,084 | 45.09% | 7,185 | 53.25% | 225 | 1.67% |
| 1936 | 8,313 | 47.75% | 8,336 | 47.88% | 761 | 4.37% |
| 1940 | 8,609 | 53.86% | 7,354 | 46.01% | 21 | 0.13% |
| 1944 | 8,787 | 59.63% | 5,881 | 39.91% | 67 | 0.45% |
| 1948 | 7,988 | 59.13% | 5,409 | 40.04% | 112 | 0.83% |
| 1952 | 11,016 | 65.82% | 5,691 | 34.00% | 30 | 0.18% |
| 1956 | 12,250 | 66.11% | 6,281 | 33.89% | 0 | 0.00% |
| 1960 | 12,933 | 62.02% | 7,895 | 37.86% | 26 | 0.12% |
| 1964 | 8,617 | 43.39% | 11,148 | 56.13% | 95 | 0.48% |
| 1968 | 11,303 | 59.78% | 5,993 | 31.70% | 1,611 | 8.52% |
| 1972 | 13,593 | 70.19% | 5,529 | 28.55% | 243 | 1.25% |
| 1976 | 12,133 | 56.90% | 8,771 | 41.14% | 418 | 1.96% |
| 1980 | 13,760 | 61.42% | 7,266 | 32.43% | 1,378 | 6.15% |
| 1984 | 16,786 | 69.44% | 7,289 | 30.15% | 99 | 0.41% |
| 1988 | 15,650 | 64.92% | 8,299 | 34.43% | 156 | 0.65% |
| 1992 | 13,552 | 45.94% | 9,576 | 32.46% | 6,373 | 21.60% |
| 1996 | 15,338 | 51.98% | 10,774 | 36.51% | 3,396 | 11.51% |
| 2000 | 20,848 | 62.34% | 11,682 | 34.93% | 914 | 2.73% |
| 2004 | 28,247 | 66.89% | 13,764 | 32.59% | 217 | 0.51% |
| 2008 | 26,349 | 58.89% | 17,633 | 39.41% | 759 | 1.70% |
| 2012 | 26,767 | 62.80% | 15,091 | 35.40% | 767 | 1.80% |
| 2016 | 31,423 | 65.48% | 14,219 | 29.63% | 2,348 | 4.89% |
| 2020 | 37,567 | 66.13% | 18,254 | 32.13% | 988 | 1.74% |
| 2024 | 40,248 | 66.12% | 19,842 | 32.60% | 781 | 1.28% |

Pennsylvania Gubernatorial election results for Adams County
| Year | Republican | | Democratic | | Third party(ies) | |
| Year | No. | % | No. | % | No. | % |
|---|---|---|---|---|---|---|
| 1910 | 2,017 | 32.65% | 2,221 | 35.95% | 1,940 | 31.40% |
| 1914 | 2,517 | 39.47% | 3,722 | 58.37% | 138 | 2.16% |
| 1918 | 4,628 | 56.68% | 3,303 | 40.45% | 234 | 2.87% |
| 1922 | 5,540 | 62.80% | 3,210 | 36.39% | 71 | 0.80% |
| 1926 | 4,628 | 57.44% | 3,303 | 41.00% | 126 | 1.56% |
| 1930 | 5,955 | 55.38% | 4,539 | 42.21% | 259 | 2.41% |
| 1934 | 6,603 | 46.92% | 7,366 | 52.34% | 105 | 0.75% |
| 1938 | 7,823 | 52.70% | 6,966 | 46.92% | 56 | 0.38% |
| 1942 | 10,460 | 71.26% | 4,149 | 28.26% | 70 | 0.48% |
| 1946 | 6,876 | 53.77% | 5,876 | 45.95% | 35 | 0.27% |
| 1950 | 7,354 | 57.18% | 5,414 | 42.10% | 93 | 0.72% |
| 1954 | 7,139 | 49.68% | 7,227 | 50.30% | 3 | 0.02% |
| 1958 | 9,860 | 55.91% | 7,723 | 43.79% | 52 | 0.29% |
| 1962 | 11,569 | 61.21% | 7,307 | 38.66% | 25 | 0.13% |
| 1966 | 10,470 | 62.40% | 6,054 | 36.08% | 256 | 1.53% |
| 1970 | 8,207 | 44.26% | 7,028 | 37.91% | 3,306 | 17.83% |
| 1974 | 8,682 | 54.18% | 7,247 | 45.23% | 95 | 0.59% |
| 1978 | 10,386 | 62.92% | 6,034 | 36.55% | 87 | 0.53% |
| 1982 | 11,346 | 60.75% | 7,217 | 38.64% | 113 | 0.61% |
| 1986 | 10,511 | 58.43% | 7,277 | 40.45% | 200 | 1.11% |
| 1990 | 5,687 | 29.03% | 13,890 | 70.90% | 15 | 0.08% |
| 1994 | 12,146 | 52.99% | 6,977 | 30.44% | 3,798 | 16.57% |
| 1998 | 14,810 | 73.83% | 3,682 | 18.35% | 1,568 | 7.82% |
| 2002 | 15,950 | 65.98% | 7,732 | 31.99% | 491 | 2.03% |
| 2006 | 17,084 | 56.72% | 13,034 | 43.28% | 0 | 0.00% |
| 2010 | 22,696 | 72.81% | 8,474 | 27.19% | 0 | 0.00% |
| 2014 | 16,790 | 60.14% | 11,130 | 39.86% | 0 | 0.00% |
| 2018 | 22,501 | 57.62% | 15,862 | 40.62% | 690 | 1.77% |
| 2022 | 26,819 | 57.73% | 18,821 | 40.51% | 819 | 1.76% |

=== Pennsylvania House of Representatives ===
Adams County consists of two Pennsylvania House Districts. The 91st district is exclusively in Adams County, comprising the southern and middle parts of the county, including Gettysburg. The 193rd District spans into Cumberland County to the north.

| District | Representative | Party |
|---|---|---|
| 91 | Dan Moul | Republican |
| 193 | Torren Ecker | Republican |

=== Pennsylvania Senate ===
Adams County is entirely contained within the 33rd Senatorial District, which also includes parts of York and Franklin counties.

| District | Representative | Party |
|---|---|---|
| 33 | Doug Mastriano | Republican |

=== United States House of Representatives ===
From 2012 until 2018, Adams County was part of the 4th Congressional District until the Pennsylvania Supreme Court ruled that the Commonwealth's Congressional Districts constituted an illegal partisan Gerrymander. As a result, Adams County was moved from the 4th District to the 13th Congressional District and elected a new representative in the 2018 election.

| District | Representative | Party |
|---|---|---|
| 13 | John Joyce | Republican |

=== United States Senate ===
- John Fetterman, Democratic
- Dave McCormick, Republican

United States Senate election results for Adams County, Pennsylvania1
| Year | Republican | | Democratic | | Third party(ies) | |
| Year | No. | % | No. | % | No. | % |
|---|---|---|---|---|---|---|
| 1916 | 3,538 | 51.83% | 3,025 | 44.32% | 263 | 3.85% |
| 1922 | 5,348 | 95.89% | 0 | 0.00% | 229 | 4.11% |
| 1922 | 5,630 | 57.99% | 3,618 | 37.26% | 461 | 4.75% |
| 1928 | 9,709 | 67.92% | 4,496 | 31.45% | 90 | 0.63% |
| 1934 | 6,590 | 48.19% | 6,908 | 50.52% | 176 | 1.29% |
| 1940 | 8,479 | 53.70% | 7,264 | 46.01% | 46 | 0.29% |
| 1946 | 7,189 | 62.62% | 4,260 | 37.10% | 32 | 0.28% |
| 1952 | 10,808 | 64.29% | 5,966 | 35.49% | 38 | 0.23% |
| 1958 | 8,683 | 59.60% | 5,851 | 40.16% | 36 | 0.25% |
| 1964 | 10,984 | 55.24% | 8,831 | 44.41% | 70 | 0.35% |
| 1970 | 9,155 | 58.66% | 5,836 | 37.40% | 615 | 3.94% |
| 1976 | 12,098 | 57.27% | 8,871 | 41.99% | 156 | 0.74% |
| 1982 | 12,808 | 68.87% | 5,618 | 30.21% | 172 | 0.92% |
| 1988 | 18,171 | 76.68% | 5,290 | 22.32% | 236 | 1.00% |
| 1991 | 12,416 | 53.48% | 10,753 | 46.32% | 47 | 0.20% |
| 1994 | 13,618 | 59.61% | 8,066 | 35.31% | 1,162 | 5.09% |
| 2000 | 21,621 | 66.03% | 10,177 | 31.08% | 948 | 2.90% |
| 2006 | 16,649 | 55.06% | 13,587 | 44.94% | 0 | 0.00% |
| 2012 | 25,647 | 60.47% | 15,763 | 37.17% | 1,002 | 2.36% |
| 2018 | 23,419 | 59.89% | 14,880 | 38.05% | 803 | 2.05% |
| 2024 | 38,505 | 63.88% | 19,947 | 33.09% | 1,824 | 3.03% |

United States Senate election results for Adams County, Pennsylvania3
| Year | Republican | | Democratic | | Third party(ies) | |
| Year | No. | % | No. | % | No. | % |
|---|---|---|---|---|---|---|
| 1920 | 5,595 | 65.22% | 2,787 | 32.49% | 196 | 2.28% |
| 1922 | 5,348 | 95.89% | 0 | 0.00% | 229 | 4.11% |
| 1926 | 2,641 | 33.05% | 5,180 | 64.82% | 170 | 2.13% |
| 1930 | 4,460 | 62.31% | 2,580 | 36.04% | 118 | 1.65% |
| 1932 | 5,655 | 43.04% | 6,961 | 52.98% | 524 | 3.99% |
| 1938 | 9,548 | 59.39% | 6,529 | 40.61% | 0 | 0.00% |
| 1944 | 7,651 | 55.21% | 6,192 | 44.68% | 14 | 0.10% |
| 1950 | 7,333 | 57.14% | 5,479 | 42.69% | 21 | 0.16% |
| 1956 | 10,753 | 62.03% | 6,561 | 37.85% | 22 | 0.13% |
| 1962 | 9,332 | 58.03% | 6,707 | 41.71% | 42 | 0.26% |
| 1968 | 12,042 | 63.99% | 6,432 | 34.18% | 344 | 1.83% |
| 1974 | 9,411 | 55.24% | 7,370 | 43.26% | 255 | 1.50% |
| 1980 | 15,223 | 63.13% | 8,241 | 34.17% | 651 | 2.70% |
| 1986 | 11,121 | 61.89% | 6,730 | 37.45% | 119 | 0.66% |
| 1992 | 14,925 | 51.36% | 12,141 | 41.78% | 1,991 | 6.85% |
| 1998 | 13,740 | 68.76% | 5,462 | 27.33% | 781 | 3.91% |
| 2004 | 27,138 | 66.30% | 10,564 | 25.81% | 3,233 | 7.90% |
| 2010 | 21,567 | 69.35% | 9,534 | 30.65% | 0 | 0.00% |
| 2016 | 30,492 | 64.19% | 14,593 | 30.72% | 2,418 | 5.09% |
| 2022 | 29,039 | 62.56% | 16,096 | 34.68% | 1,284 | 2.77% |

=== Voter registration ===
As of February 8, 2025, there were 74,542 registered voters in the county. Republicans hold a majority of the voters. There were 43,362 registered Republicans, 18,828 registered Democrats, 9,476 voters without any partisan affiliation, and 2,876 voters registered to other parties. "Other parties" also includes voters who left their preferred party blank; only those who chose "no affiliation" are included under "no partisan affiliation".

Voter registration
1. Republican (58.2%)
2. Democratic (25.3%)
3. No party affiliation (12.7%)
4. Other parties (3.86%)

Voter registration and party enrollment
| Party | Number of voters | Percentage |
|---|---|---|
| Republican | 43,362 | 58.17% |
| Democratic | 18,828 | 25.26% |
| No partisan affiliation | 9,476 | 12.71% |
| Other parties | 2,876 | 3.86% |
| Total | 74,542 | 100% |

== Demographics ==
Historical population
| Census | Pop. | Note | %± |
|---|---|---|---|
| 1800 | 13,172 | | — |
| 1810 | 15,152 | | 15.0% |
| 1820 | 19,370 | | 27.8% |
| 1830 | 21,379 | | 10.4% |
| 1840 | 23,044 | | 7.8% |
| 1850 | 25,981 | | 12.7% |
| 1860 | 28,006 | | 7.8% |
| 1870 | 30,315 | | 8.2% |
| 1880 | 32,455 | | 7.1% |
| 1890 | 33,486 | | 3.2% |
| 1900 | 34,496 | | 3.0% |
| 1910 | 34,319 | | −0.5% |
| 1920 | 34,583 | | 0.8% |
| 1930 | 37,128 | | 7.4% |
| 1940 | 39,435 | | 6.2% |
| 1950 | 44,197 | | 12.1% |
| 1960 | 51,906 | | 17.4% |
| 1970 | 56,937 | | 9.7% |
| 1980 | 68,292 | | 19.9% |
| 1990 | 78,274 | | 14.6% |
| 2000 | 91,292 | | 16.6% |
| 2010 | 101,407 | | 11.1% |
| 2020 | 103,852 | | 2.4% |
| 2025 (est.) | 107,594 | ▲ | 3.6% |
U.S. Decennial Census; 1790–1960 1900–1990; 1990–2000 2010–2017

=== Racial and ethnic composition ===
Adams County, Pennsylvania – Racial and ethnic composition Note: the US Census treats Hispanic/Latino as an ethnic category. This table excludes Latinos from the racial categories and assigns them to a separate category. Hispanics/Latinos may be of any race.
| Race / Ethnicity (NH = Non-Hispanic) | Pop 1980 | Pop 1990 | Pop 2000 | Pop 2010 | Pop 2020 | % 1980 | % 1990 | % 2000 | % 2010 | % 2020 |
|---|---|---|---|---|---|---|---|---|---|---|
| White alone (NH) | 66,683 | 75,735 | 85,558 | 91,830 | 89,945 | 97.64% | 96.76% | 93.72% | 90.56% | 86.61% |
| Black or African American alone (NH) | 675 | 861 | 1,046 | 1,450 | 1,473 | 0.99% | 1.10% | 1.15% | 1.43% | 1.42% |
| Native American or Alaska Native alone (NH) | 47 | 78 | 164 | 146 | 147 | 0.07% | 0.10% | 0.18% | 0.14% | 0.14% |
| Asian alone (NH) | 192 | 363 | 446 | 737 | 952 | 0.28% | 0.46% | 0.49% | 0.73% | 0.92% |
| Native Hawaiian or Pacific Islander alone (NH) | x | x | 16 | 20 | 33 | x | x | 0.02% | 0.02% | 0.03% |
| Other race alone (NH) | 82 | 21 | 84 | 79 | 333 | 0.12% | 0.03% | 0.09% | 0.08% | 0.32% |
| Mixed race or Multiracial (NH) | x | x | 655 | 1,030 | 3,179 | x | x | 0.72% | 1.02% | 3.06% |
| Hispanic or Latino (any race) | 613 | 1,216 | 3,323 | 6,115 | 7,790 | 0.90% | 1.55% | 3.64% | 6.03% | 7.50% |
| Total | 68,292 | 78,274 | 91,292 | 101,407 | 103,852 | 100.00% | 100.00% | 100.00% | 100.00% | 100.00% |

=== 2020 census ===
As of the 2020 census, the county had a population of 103,852. The median age was 44.7 years. 20.1% of residents were under the age of 18 and 21.6% of residents were 65 years of age or older. For every 100 females there were 97.4 males, and for every 100 females age 18 and over there were 95.6 males age 18 and over.

36.7% of residents lived in urban areas, while 63.3% lived in rural areas.

The racial makeup of the county was 88.1% White, 1.5% Black or African American, 0.3% American Indian and Alaska Native, 0.9% Asian, <0.1% Native Hawaiian and Pacific Islander, 3.7% from some other race, and 5.4% from two or more races. Hispanic or Latino residents of any race comprised 7.5% of the population.

There were 40,270 households in the county, of which 27.3% had children under the age of 18 living in them. Of all households, 55.3% were married-couple households, 15.5% were households with a male householder and no spouse or partner present, and 21.9% were households with a female householder and no spouse or partner present. About 24.3% of all households were made up of individuals and 12.5% had someone living alone who was 65 years of age or older. There were 43,007 housing units, of which 6.4% were vacant. Among occupied housing units, 77.2% were owner-occupied and 22.8% were renter-occupied. The homeowner vacancy rate was 1.2% and the rental vacancy rate was 4.3%.

=== 2022 American Community Survey ===
As of the 2022, there were 106,027 people and 40,676 households in the county. The population density was 204.4 people per square mile. There were 43,653 housing units with 76% of the units owner occupied.

90.7% of the population 25 years and over were high school graduates, and 24.3% had a bachelor's degree or higher. Per capita income was $36,150, and the median household income was $76,727. 8.4% of the population lived below the poverty line.

7.8% of the population were military veterans. 19% of the population was under 18, 59% between 18 and 64, and 22% 65 or over.

There were 40,676 households, of which 68% were married couples living together, 10% had a female householder with no husband present, 4% had a male householder with no wife present, and 17% were non-families. The average household size was 2.5. The median value of owner-occupied housing units was $255,900.

== Metropolitan and combined statistical area ==
The US OMB has designated Adams County as the Gettysburg, PA metropolitan statistical area (MSA). As of the 2010 census the metropolitan area population of 101,407 ranked 19th most populous in the State of Pennsylvania and the 349th most populous in the United States. Adams County is also a part of the larger Harrisburg–York–Lebanon combined statistical area (CSA), which combines the populations of Adams County with those of Cumberland, Dauphin, Lebanon, Perry and York counties in Pennsylvania. The combined statistical area ranked 5th in the State of Pennsylvania and 43rd most populous in the United States, with a population of 1,219,422.

== Education ==
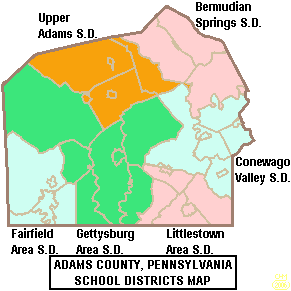
Map of Adams County school districts

=== Colleges and universities ===
- Gettysburg College
- United Lutheran Seminary

=== Community, junior and technical colleges ===
- Harrisburg Area Community College

=== Public school districts ===
School districts include:

- Bermudian Springs School District
- Conewago Valley School District
- Fairfield Area School District
- Gettysburg Area School District
- Littlestown Area School District
- Upper Adams School District

=== Public charter schools ===
- Gettysburg Montessori Charter School – Gettysburg (K-6)
- Vida Charter School – Gettysburg (K-6)

County residents may apply to attend any of the Commonwealth's 14 (as of 2015) public, cyber charter schools at no additional cost to the parents.

=== Private schools ===
As reported by Pennsylvania Department of Education May 2024

- Adams County Christian Academy – Gettysburg
- Delone Catholic High School – McSherrystown
- Forest Lane Mennonite School – Gettysburg
- Freedom Christian School – Gettysburg
- Gettysburg Adventist Christian School – Gettysburg
- Indian Acres Amish School - Gettysburg
- JIL Christian School – Biglerville
- Pheasant Cottage Amish School - Littlestown
- St. Francis Xavier School - Gettysburg
- St. Teresa of Calcutta School (Conewago) - Hanover
- St. Teresa of Calcutta School -McSherrystown

=== Intermediate Unit ===
Lincoln Intermediate Unit (IU#12) region includes Adams, Franklin, and York counties. The agency offers school districts, home schooled students and private schools many services including: Special education services, combined purchasing, and instructional technology services. It runs Summer Academy, which offers both art and academic strands designed to meet the needs of gifted, talented and high achieving students. Additional services include: Curriculum Mapping, Professional Development for school employees, Adult Education, Nonpublic School Services, Business Services, Migrant & ESL (English as a Second Language), Instructional Services, Special Education, Management Services, and Technology Services. It provides a GED program for adults to earn a high school diploma, and offers literacy programs. The Lincoln Intermediate Unit is governed by a 13-member board of directors, each a member of a local school board from the 25 school districts. Board members are elected by school directors of all 25 school districts for three-year terms that begin July 1. There are 29 intermediate units in Pennsylvania. They are funded by school districts, state and federal program specific funding and grants; they do not have the power to tax.

=== Libraries ===
- A R Wentz Library – Gettysburg
- Adams County Historical Society – Gettysburg
- Carroll Valley Library – Carroll Valley
- Adams County Law Library – Gettysburg
- Adams County Library - Gettysburg
- Harbaugh-Thomas Library – Biglervilleh
- Jean Barnett Trone Memorial Library of East Berlin – East Berlin
- Littlestown Community Library – Littlestown
- Musselman Library – Gettysburg
- New Oxford Area Library – New Oxford

== Transportation ==
=== Air ===
There are currently no scheduled commercial flights into Adams County. The nearest airports with regular commercial service are in Hagerstown, Maryland (Hagerstown Regional Airport), Harrisburg, Pennsylvania (Harrisburg International Airport), and Lancaster, Pennsylvania (Lancaster Airport).

=== Bus ===
Public bus service in Adams County is available through the Adams County Transit Authority.

=== Major roads and highways ===
- US 15
- US 15 Bus.
- US 30
- PA 16
- PA 34
- PA 94
- PA 97
- PA 116
- PA 134
- PA 194
- PA 233
- PA 234
- PA 394

== Communities ==
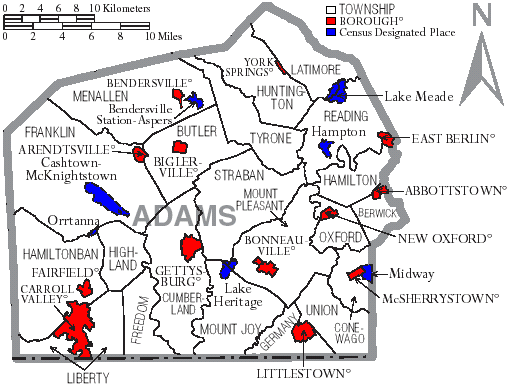
Map of Adams County with municipal labels showing boroughs (red), townships (white), and census-designated places (blue)

Under Pennsylvania law, there are four types of incorporated municipalities: cities, boroughs, townships, and, in at most two cases, towns. The following boroughs and townships are located in Adams County, as well as unincorporated areas and CDPs:

=== Boroughs ===
- Abbottstown
- Arendtsville
- Bendersville
- Biglerville
- Bonneauville
- Carroll Valley
- East Berlin
- Fairfield
- Gettysburg (county seat)
- Littlestown
- McSherrystown
- New Oxford
- York Springs

=== Townships ===
- Berwick
- Butler
- Conewago
- Cumberland
- Franklin
- Freedom
- Germany
- Hamilton
- Hamiltonban
- Highland
- Huntington
- Latimore
- Liberty
- Menallen
- Mount Joy
- Mount Pleasant
- Oxford
- Reading
- Straban
- Tyrone
- Union

=== Census-designated places ===
Census-designated places are geographical areas designated by the U.S. Census Bureau for the purposes of compiling demographic data, but are not actual jurisdictions under Pennsylvania law. Other unincorporated communities, such as villages, may be listed here as well.

- Aspers
- Cashtown
- Gardners
- Hampton
- Heidlersburg
- Hunterstown
- Idaville
- Lake Heritage
- Lake Meade
- Midway
- McKnightstown
- Orrtanna
- Table Rock

=== Unincorporated areas ===
- Advance
- Amatus
- Barlow
- Beechersville
- Berlin Junction
- Bermudian
- Bittinger
- Bridgeport
- Brush Run
- Brushtown
- Brysonia
- Cedar Ridge
- Centennial
- Center Mills
- Charnita
- Cross Keys
- Deardorffs Mill
- Edgegrove
- Fairplay
- Five Points
- Flora Dale
- Fountain Dale
- Gargol
- Georgetown
- Germantown
- Gladhill
- Goldenville
- Green Springs
- Greenmount
- Greenstone
- Guernsey
- Guldens
- Hafer's Mill
- Hershey Heights
- Hilltown
- Indian Village
- Irishtown
- Iron Springs
- Jacks Mountain
- Kingsdale
- Knoxlyn
- Latimore
- Maria Furnace
- Menges Mill
- Mount Hope
- Mount Misery
- Mount Tabor
- Mummasburg
- New Chester
- Oak Grove
- Peach Glen
- Plainview
- Round Hill
- Quaker Valley
- Sedgwick
- Sell
- Seven Stars
- Shanks Mill
- Slate Ridge
- Square Corner
- Stremmels
- The Pines
- Two Taverns
- Virginia Mills
- Waldheim
- Wenksville
- Whitehall
- Zora

=== Population ranking ===
The population ranking of the following table is based on the 2010 census of Adams County.

† county seat

| Rank | City/town/etc. | Population (2010 Census) | Municipal type | Incorporated |
|---|---|---|---|---|
| 1 | † Gettysburg | 7,620 | Borough | 1806 |
| 2 | Littlestown | 4,434 | Borough | 1864 |
| 3 | Carroll Valley | 3,876 | Borough | 1974 |
| 4 | McSherrystown | 3,038 | Borough | 1882 |
| 5 | Lake Meade | 2,563 | CDP | |
| 6 | Midway | 2,125 | CDP | |
| 7 | Bonneauville | 1,800 | Borough | 1961 |
| 8 | New Oxford | 1,783 | Borough | 1874 |
| 9 | East Berlin | 1,521 | Borough | 1879 |
| 10 | Lake Heritage | 1,333 | CDP | |
| 11 | Biglerville | 1,200 | Borough | 1903 |
| 12 | Abbottstown | 1,011 | Borough | 1835 |
| 13 | Arendtsville | 952 | Borough | 1896 |
| 14 | York Springs | 833 | Borough | 1868 |
| 15 | Heidlersburg | 707 | CDP | |
| 16 | Bendersville | 641 | Borough | 1866 |
| 17 | Hampton | 632 | CDP | |
| 18 | Hunterstown | 547 | CDP | |
| 19 | Fairfield | 507 | Borough | 1896 |
| 20 | Cashtown | 459 | CDP | |
| 21 | Aspers | 350 | CDP | |
| 22 | McKnightstown | 226 | CDP | |
| 23 | Idaville | 177 | CDP | |
| 24 | Orrtanna | 173 | CDP | |
| 25 | Gardners | 150 | CDP | |
| 26 | Table Rock | 62 | CDP | |
| 27 | Floradale | 38 | CDP | |

== Notable people ==
- Joel Funk Asper, former U.S. Congressman
- Gabor Boritt, historian of Abraham Lincoln and the American Civil War, professor at Gettysburg College
- Jake Boritt, documentary producer
- Henry R. Brinkerhoff, former U.S. Congressman
- David A. Day, former Lutheran missionary to Liberia
- Dwight D. Eisenhower and Mamie Eisenhower, their retirement home outside Gettysburg is preserved as Eisenhower National Historic Site
- Erik Harris, professional football player, Atlanta Falcons
- John A. Hauser, former president of C. H. Musselman Compan
- Susan McSween, prominent cattlewoman and widow of Alexander McSween
- Eddie Plank, former Major League Baseball pitcher; third winningest left-handed pitcher of all time and 1946 Baseball Hall of Fame inductee
- John S. Rice, former U.S. ambassador to the Netherlands
- John Studebaker, co-founder of company that became the Studebaker Corporation

== See also ==
- Adams County Courthouse (Pennsylvania)
- National Register of Historic Places listings in Adams County, Pennsylvania
- List of counties in Pennsylvania
