= Beechersville, Pennsylvania =

Unincorporated community in Pennsylvania, US

- Unincorporated community
- Location within Pennsylvania
- Coordinates: 39°55′02″N 77°17′22″W
- Country: United States
- State: Pennsylvania
- County: Adams
- Township: Butler
- Elevation: 640 ft (200 m)
- Time zone: UTC-5 (Eastern (EST))
  - Summer (DST): UTC-4 (EDT)
- Area code: 717
- GNIS feature ID: 1169115

Beechersville is an unincorporated community in Adams County, Pennsylvania, United States. It is located off Cherry Street where Gettysburg Street becomes Mummasburg Road, adjacent to the borough of Arendtsville.
