= Lake Meade, Pennsylvania =

Unincorporated community in Pennsylvania, US

- Census-designated place
- Location in Adams County and the U.S. state of Pennsylvania.
- Coordinates: 39°59′6″N 77°2′48″W
- Country: United States
- State: Pennsylvania
- County: Adams
- Townships: Latimore, Reading

Area
  - Total: 1.74 sq mi (4.51 km^{2})
  - Land: 1.32 sq mi (3.42 km^{2})
  - Water: 0.42 sq mi (1.09 km^{2})
- Elevation: 499 ft (152 m)

Population (2020)
  - Total: 2,539
  - Density: 1,924.8/sq mi (743.17/km^{2})
- Time zone: UTC-5 (Eastern (EST))
  - Summer (DST): UTC-4 (EDT)
- ZIP code: 17316
- Area code: 717
- FIPS code: 42-40988
- GNIS feature ID: 2390019
- Website: www.lakemeade.org

Lake Meade is an unincorporated census-designated place in Latimore and Reading townships, Adams County, Pennsylvania, United States. The population was 2,539 at the 2020 census.

== Geography ==
The community of Lake Meade is located around an artificial lake of the same name at 39°59′6″N 77°2′48″W (39.984958, -77.046734). The lake is an impoundment of Mud Run, a tributary of Bermudian Creek, the water of which flows via Conewago Creek to the Susquehanna River and eventually Chesapeake Bay.

According to the United States Census Bureau, the community has a total area of 1.7 square miles (4.5 km^{2}), of which 1.3 square miles (3.4 km^{2}) is land and 0.42 square miles (1.1 km^{2}), or 24.28%, is water.

== Demographics ==
Historical population
Census	Pop.	Note	%±
2010	2,563		—
2020	2,539		−0.9%
U.S. Decennial Census

As of the census of 2010, there were 2,563 people, 653 households, and 543 families residing in the community. The 2016 estimate, however, indicated that the population may have decreased to an estimated 2436. In 2010, the population density was 1,800.4 inhabitants per square mile (695.1/km^{2}). There were 760 housing units at an average density of 746.9 per square mile (288.4/km^{2}). The racial makeup of the community was 98.3% White, 0.2% African American, 0.1% Native American, 0.4% Asian, 0% Pacific Islander, 0.7% from other races, and 0.3% from two or more races. Hispanic or Latino of any race were 1.8% of the population.

There were 916 households, out of which 37.7% had children under the age of 18 living with them, 76.5% were married couples living together, 5.0% had a female householder with no husband present, and 15.5% were non-families. 12.1% of all households were made up of individuals, and 5.2% had someone living alone who was 65 years of age or older. The average household size was 2.80 and the average family size was 3.05.

The population was spread out, with no single age category holding more than 10% of the population. The largest three age demographics were 45–49, 10–14, and 50–54 years, with percentages of 9.2, 8.7, and 8.7, respectively. The median age was 40.8 years. For every 100 females, there were 101.5 males.

The estimated 2016 median household income was $88,050, and the median income for a family was an estimated $92,361, with margins of error of ±$14,708 and ±$12,755, respectively. Of full-time employees, males had a median income of $58,750 versus $53,365 for females. The estimated per capita income for the community was $36,209. About 0.7% of families and 2.7% of the population were below the poverty line.

== Governance ==
Lake Meade is split between Reading and Latimore Townships, with a majority living in Reading. Both sides, however, are served by the Lake Meade Municipal Authority, which is stationed inside the neighborhood.

All members of the community must abide by the Rules and Regulations of the Lake Meade Property Owner's Association. The Board of Directors of the LMPOA is chosen by vote by the property owners, who meet monthly and in turn establish subcommittees to handle other administrative duties.

== Education ==
All residents of Lake Meade live within the Bermudian Springs School District,. and vote in Region III for members of the Board. Students attend Bermudian Springs Elementary, Middle, and High Schools.
