= Hampton, Pennsylvania =

Unincorporated community in Pennsylvania, US

- Census-designated place
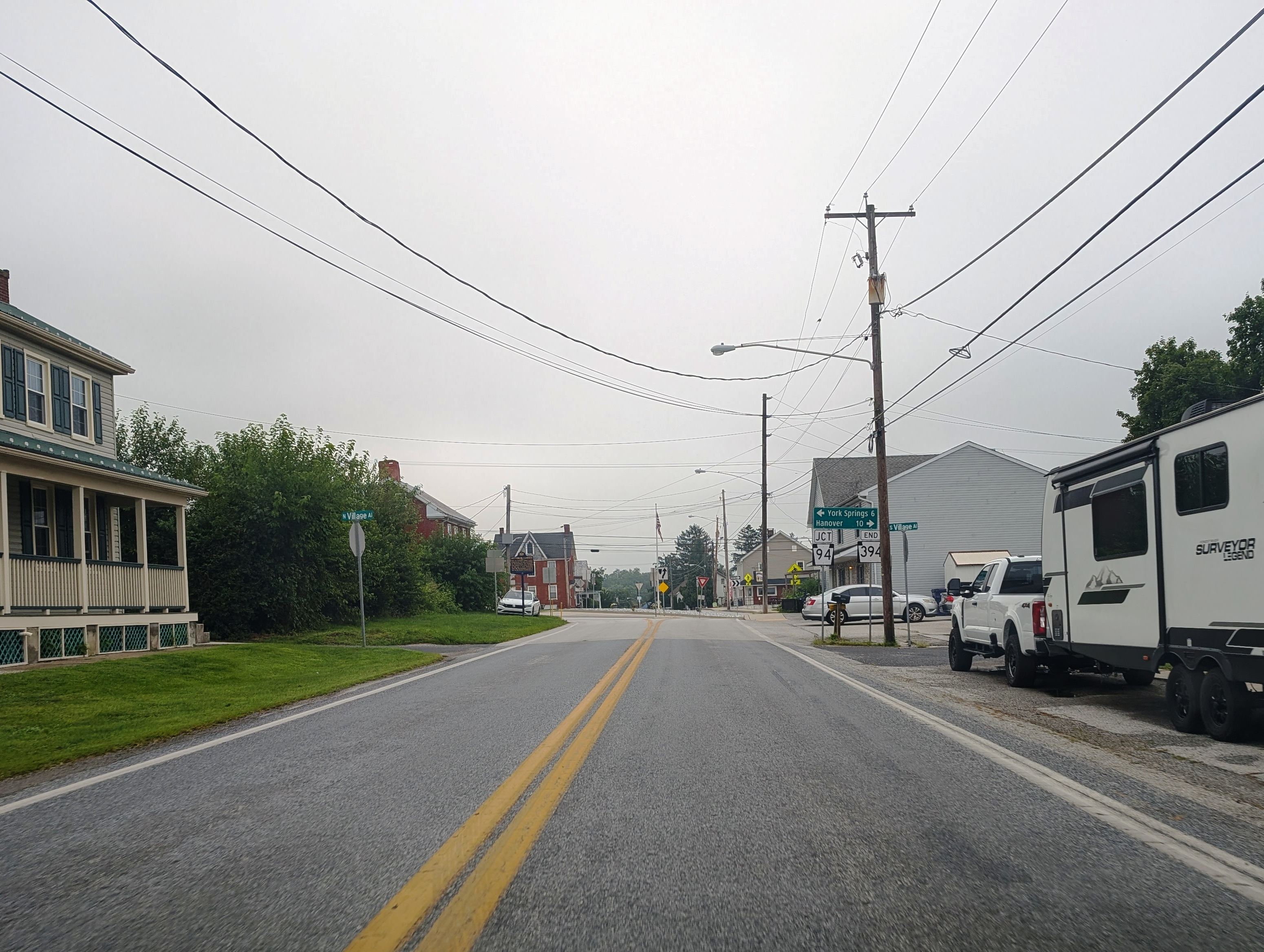
- PA 394 eastbound near the center of the village

- Location in Adams County and the U.S. state of Pennsylvania.
- Coordinates: 39°55′42″N 77°3′25″W
- Country: United States
- State: Pennsylvania
- County: Adams
- Township: Reading

Area
  - Total: 1.80 sq mi (4.66 km^{2})
  - Land: 1.77 sq mi (4.58 km^{2})
  - Water: 0.031 sq mi (0.08 km^{2})

Population (2020)
  - Total: 1,432
  - Density: 810.2/sq mi (312.81/km^{2})
- Time zone: UTC-5 (Eastern (EST))
  - Summer (DST): UTC-4 (EDT)
- FIPS code: 42-32320
- GNIS feature ID: 1176443

Hampton is a village and census-designated place in Reading Township, Pennsylvania, United States. The population was 1,432 at the 2020 census.

== History ==
The village of Hampton was originally surveyed in 1814 by Daniel Deardorff on the request of Dr. John B. Arnold. The first property in Hampton was owned by David Albert and completed in 1814, though it would take years before other properties were established in the Hampton area. The town had a post office for many years, as well as a hotel called "The Washington House."

== Geography ==
Hampton is located in Reading Township at 39°55′42″N 77°3′25″W (39.928268, -77.057051). It is situated at the intersection of Pennsylvania Route 94 (Carlisle Pike) and Pennsylvania Route 394 (Huntersville Hampton Road). Via Route 94, it is 21 miles (34 km) north to Carlisle and 10 miles (16 km) south to Hanover.

According to the United States Census Bureau, the community has an area of 0.6 square miles (1.6 km^{2}), all land.

== Demographics ==
Historical population
Census	Pop.	Note	%±
2020	1,432		—
U.S. Decennial Census

As of the census of 2000, there were 633 people, 222 households, and 172 families residing in the community. The population density was 1,010.2 inhabitants per square mile (390.0/km^{2}). There were 238 housing units at an average density of 379.8 per square mile (146.6/km^{2}). The racial makeup of the community was 97.79% White, 0.16% African American, 0.32% Asian, 0.79% from other races, and 0.95% from two or more races. Hispanic or Latino of any race were 2.05% of the population.

There were 222 households, out of which 45.0% had children under the age of 18 living with them, 60.8% were married couples living together, 13.5% had a female householder with no husband present, and 22.5% were non-families. 18.0% of all households were made up of individuals, and 5.0% had someone living alone who was 65 years of age or older. The average household size was 2.82 and the average family size was 3.18.

The population was spread out, with 31.1% under the age of 18, 8.8% from 18 to 24, 37.1% from 25 to 44, 16.4% from 45 to 64, and 6.5% who were 65 years of age or older. The median age was 31 years. For every 100 females, there were 90.1 males. For every 100 females age 18 and over, there were 92.1 males.

The median income for a household in the community was $39,861, and the median income for a family was $40,156. Males had a median income of $38,750 versus $24,375 for females. The per capita income for the community was $14,901. About 13.3% of families and 17.6% of the population were below the poverty line, including 33.7% of those under age 18 and none of those age 65 or over.

== Education ==
It is in the Bermudian Springs School District.
