= Butler Township, Pennsylvania =

Butler Township is the name of some places in the U.S. state of Pennsylvania:

- Butler Township, Adams County, Pennsylvania
- Butler Township, Butler County, Pennsylvania
- Butler Township, Luzerne County, Pennsylvania
- Butler Township, Schuylkill County, Pennsylvania
