= Reading, Pennsylvania (disambiguation) =

Reading, Pennsylvania could refer to:

- The city of Reading, Pennsylvania
- West Reading, Pennsylvania
- Reading Township, Pennsylvania
