= Mount Pleasant Township, Pennsylvania =

Mount Pleasant Township may refer to:

- Mount Pleasant Township, Adams County, Pennsylvania
- Mount Pleasant Township, Columbia County, Pennsylvania
- Mount Pleasant Township, Washington County, Pennsylvania
- Mount Pleasant Township, Wayne County, Pennsylvania
- Mount Pleasant Township, Westmoreland County, Pennsylvania
