= Bermudian Springs High School =

Location
- 7335 Carlisle Pike; York Springs, Pennsylvania; Adams County
- Coordinates: 39.9824°N 77.0834°W

Information
- Type: Public
- Motto: Preparing students for the future, everyday
- School district: Bermudian Springs School District
- NCES School ID: 420345000003
- Principal: Mike Brooks
- Teaching staff: 39.91 (on an FTE basis)
- Grades: 9th to 12th
- Enrollment: 602 (2023–2024)
- Student to teacher ratio: 15.08
- Colors: Red, Black, Silver, and White
- Mascot: Eagles
- Website: hs.bermudian.org

Bermudian Springs High School is a public high school located near the borough of York Springs, Pennsylvania. It is the sole high school operated by the Bermudian Springs School District. The school serves students from most of northeastern Adams County, including the townships of Reading, Latimore, part of Hamilton, and Huntington, as well as the Boroughs of East Berlin and York Springs.

As of the 2020-21 school year, enrollment was 619 pupils in 9th through 12th grades. The school employed 41.91 teachers on a full-time employment basis, yielding a student/faculty ratio of 14.77, according to National Center for Education Statistics data.

== Extracurriculars ==
Bermudian Springs School District offers a wide variety of clubs and activities, and an extensive sports program.

=== Sports ===
Bermudian Springs High School is a league member of the York Adams Interscholastic Athletic Association, and is located in PIAA District III.

The district offers an extensive sports program, including, as of the 2016–17 school year:

Boys

- Baseball - AAAA
- Basketball- AAAA
- Cross country - AA
- Football - AAA
- Golf - AA
- Soccer - AA
- Tennis - AA
- Track and field - AA
- Wrestling - AA

Girls

- Basketball - AAAA
- Cheer - AAAAAA
- Cross country - AA
- Field hockey - A
- Golf - AA
- Soccer - AA
- Softball - AAAA
- Tennis - AA
- Track and field - AA
- Volleyball - AA
