= Mount Tabor, Adams County, Pennsylvania =

Unincorporated community in Pennsylvania, US

Mount Tabor, Pennsylvania
- Unincorporated community
- Location in Pennsylvania
- Coordinates: 40°00′48″N 77°14′22″W
- Country: United States
- State: Pennsylvania
- County: Adams
- Township: Menallen
- Elevation: 1,073 ft (327 m)
- Time zone: UTC-5 (Eastern (EST))
  - Summer (DST): UTC-4 (EDT)
- Area code: 717
- GNIS feature ID: 1181852

Mount Tabor is an unincorporated community in Adams County, Pennsylvania, United States. Mount Tabor is located in Menallen Township off Pennsylvania Route 34 and is approximately 2 miles (3 km) west of Idaville.
