= Gargol, Pennsylvania =

Unincorporated community in Pennsylvania, U.S.

Coordinates: 40°00′57″N 77°10′22″W

Gargol is a small unincorporated community in Huntington Township, Adams County, Pennsylvania, United States. Gargol is located approximately halfway between Idaville and York Springs.
