= Conewago Valley School District =

School district in Pennsylvania

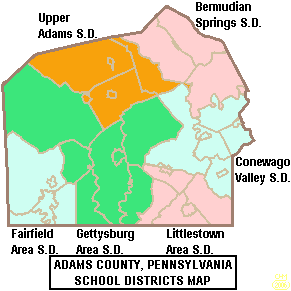
- Map of Adams County school districts

Address
- 130 Berlin Road New Oxford, Adams County, Pennsylvania, 17350-1206; United States

District information
- Type: Public

Students and staff
- District mascot: Colonials

Other information
- Website: conewago.k12.pa.us/

The Conewago Valley School District is a midsized, rural public school district. Conewago Valley School District encompasses approximately 73 square miles (190 km^{2}). It serves the Boroughs of Abbottstown, the northern portion of Bonneauville, McSherrystown and New Oxford and Berwick Township, Conewago Township, Hamilton Township, all but the southwestern edge of Mount Pleasant Township, Oxford Township, the eastern edge of Straban Township and the southeastern edge of Tyrone Township in Adams County, Pennsylvania. According to 2000 Federal Census data, it served a resident population of 23,314. By 2010, the district's population increased to 27,336 people. The educational attainment levels for the School District population (25 years old and over) were 84.1% high school graduates and 13.5% college graduates.

According to the Pennsylvania Budget and Policy Center, 37.3% of the District's pupils lived at 185% or below the Federal Poverty level as shown by their eligibility for the federal free or reduced price school meal programs in 2012. In 2009, Conewago Valley School District residents' per capita income was $18,281, while the median family income was $48,174. In the Commonwealth of Pennsylvania, the median family income was $49,501 and the United States median family income was $49,445, in 2010. In Adams County, the median household income was $56,529. By 2013, the median household income in the United States rose to $52,100.

According to Conewago Valley School District (CVSD) officials, in school year 2005–06, the District provided basic educational services to 3,788 pupils. It employed: 245 teachers, 116 full-time and part-time support personnel, and 13 administrators. Conewago Valley School District received more than $11.4 million in state funding in school year 2005–06. Per District officials, in school year 2007–08, the Conewago Valley School District provided basic educational services to 3,937 pupils. It employed: 259 teachers, 150 full-time and part-time support personnel, and 14 administrators. Conewago Valley School District received more than $13.3 million in state funding in school year 2007–08.

Conewago Valley School District operates New Oxford High School (9th–12th), New Oxford Middle School (7th–8th), Conewago Valley Intermediate School (4th–6th), Conewago Township Elementary School (K-3rd) and New Oxford Elementary School (K-3rd). High school students, in 11th and 12th grades, may choose to attend Adams County Tech Prep, which is operated by the Gettysburg Area School District, for training in the construction and mechanical trades. The Lincoln Intermediate Unit IU12 provides the District with a wide variety of services like specialized education for disabled students and hearing, speech and visual disability services and professional development for staff and faculty.

== Extracurriculars ==
Conewago Valley School District offers a variety of clubs, activities and an extensive sports program.

=== Sports ===
The District funds:

Boys:

- Baseball – AAAAA
- Basketball – AAAAA
- Cross Country – AAA
- Football – AAAAA
- Golf – AAA
- Indoor Track and Field – AAAA
- Lacrosse – AA
- Soccer – AAAA
- Swimming and Diving – AAA
- Tennis – AAA
- Track and Field – AAA
- Volleyball – AAA
- Wrestling – AAA

Girls:

- Basketball – AAAAA
- Cheer – AAAAAA
- Cross Country – AAA
- Field Hockey – AA
- Indoor Track and Field – AAAA
- Lacrosse – AAA
- Soccer (Fall) – AAAA
- Softball – AAAAA
- Swimming and Diving – AAA
- Girls' Tennis – AAA
- Track and Field – AAA
- Volleyball – AAAA

Middle School sports:

Boys:

- Basketball
- Cross Country
- Football
- Soccer
- Track and Field
- Wrestling

Girls:

- Basketball
- Cheer
- Cross Country
- Field Hockey
- Soccer
- Track and Field
- Volleyball

According to PIAA directory January 2017
