= Knoxlyn, Pennsylvania =

Unincorporated community in Pennsylvania, U.S.

- Unincorporated community
- Location within Pennsylvania Location within the United States
- Coordinates: 39°49′51″N 77°19′01″W
- Country: United States
- State: Pennsylvania
- County: Adams
- Elevation: 541 ft (165 m)
- Time zone: UTC-5 (Eastern (EST))
  - Summer (DST): UTC-4 (EDT)
- Area codes: 717 & 223
- GNIS feature ID: 1203958

Knoxlyn is an unincorporated community situated in Highland Township in Adams County, Pennsylvania, United States. It is located 8 kilometers (5.0 mi) west of Gettysburg between U.S. Route 30 and Pennsylvania Route 116.
