= Peach Glen, Pennsylvania =

Unincorporated community in Pennsylvania, US

- Unincorporated community
- Location within Pennsylvania
- Coordinates: 40°01′23″N 77°13′48″W
- Country: United States
- State: Pennsylvania
- County: Adams
- Township: Tyrone
- Elevation: 984 ft (300 m)
- Time zone: UTC-5 (Eastern (EST))
  - Summer (DST): UTC-4 (EDT)
- Area code: 717
- GNIS feature ID: 1183418

Peach Glen is an unincorporated community in Adams County, Pennsylvania, United States. The small community is located in uppermost Tyrone Township, on the border between Adams and Cumberland counties.
