= Midway, Adams County, Pennsylvania =

Unincorporated community in Pennsylvania, US

Midway, Pennsylvania
- Census-designated place
- Location in Adams County and the state of Pennsylvania.
- Coordinates: 39°48′16″N 77°0′18″W
- Country: United States
- State: Pennsylvania
- County: Adams
- Township: Conewago

Area
  - Total: 0.33 sq mi (0.86 km^{2})
  - Land: 0.33 sq mi (0.86 km^{2})
  - Water: 0 sq mi (0.00 km^{2})
- Elevation: 597 ft (182 m)

Population (2020)
  - Total: 1,059
  - Density: 3,189.5/sq mi (1,231.49/km^{2})
- Time zone: UTC-5 (Eastern (EST))
  - Summer (DST): UTC-4 (EDT)
- ZIP code: 17331
- FIPS code: 42-49224
- GNIS feature ID: 1181080

Midway is an unincorporated census-designated place in Adams County, Pennsylvania, United States. The population was 1,059 at the 2020 census.

== Geography ==
Midway is located at 39°48′16″N 77°0′18″W (39.804515, -77.004898). It is bordered by the borough of Hanover to the east and by the borough of McSherrystown to the west. Pennsylvania Route 116 passes through the center of the community.

According to the United States Census Bureau, Midway has a total area of 1.7 square miles (4.4 km^{2}), all land.

== Demographics ==
Historical population
Census	Pop.	Note	%±
2010	2,125		—
2020	1,059		−50.2%
U.S. Decennial Census

As of the census of 2000, there were 2,323 people, 904 households, and 646 families residing in Midway. The population density was 3,421.6 inhabitants per square mile (1,321.1/km^{2}). There were 923 housing units at an average density of 1,359.5 per square mile (524.9/km^{2}). The racial makeup of the community was 97.55% White, 0.65% African American, 0.04% Native American, 0.13% Asian, 1.16% from other races, and 0.47% from two or more races. Hispanic or Latino of any race were 2.58% of the population.

There were 904 households, out of which 34.1% had children under the age of 18 living with them, 58.5% were married couples living together, 9.3% had a female householder with no husband present, and 28.5% were non-families. 21.9% of all households were made up of individuals, and 9.1% had someone living alone who was 65 years of age or older. The average household size was 2.57 and the average family size was 3.02.

The population was spread out, with 25.7% under the age of 18, 7.3% from 18 to 24, 32.6% from 25 to 44, 21.1% from 45 to 64, and 13.3% who were 65 years of age or older. The median age was 36 years. For every 100 females, there were 94.4 males. For every 100 females age 18 and over, there were 95.4 males.

The median income for a household in the community was $42,621, and the median income for a family was $46,875. Males had a median income of $33,429 versus $24,865 for females. The per capita income for the community was $17,928. About 1.8% of families and 3.4% of the population were below the poverty line, including 3.9% of those under age 18 and 6.1% of those age 65 or over.

== Education ==
The census-designated place is in the Conewago Valley School District.
