= Pennsylvania State Game Lands Number 249 =

Protected area in the United States

- Location within Pennsylvania
- Location: Adams County, Pennsylvania
- Nearest city: Biglerville, Bendersville, Arendtsville
- Coordinates: 39°56′30″N 77°10′0″WIt
- Area: 1,959 acres (793 ha)
- Designation: Pennsylvania State Game Lands
- Owner: Pennsylvania Game Commission

The Pennsylvania State Game Lands Number 249 are Pennsylvania State Game Lands in northeastern Adams County in Pennsylvania in the United States.

== Geography ==
The Game Lands consists of 1,959 acres (793 ha) and three parcels located approximately 12 miles (19 km) northeast of Gettysburg, Pennsylvania in Butler, Huntington, Latimore, Reading, and TyroneTownships in Adams County. The nearest cities are Biglerville, Bendersville, Arendtsville. The western parcel is drained by the Conewago Creek (west). The center parcel is drained by the Bermudian Creek and North Branch Mud Run. The eastern parcel is also drained by the North Branch Mud Run as well as the main branch of Mud Run . Pennsylvania Route 234 passes nearby to the north of the western parcel and touches the southernmost point of the center parcel. U.S. Route 15 passes north and south between the same two parcels. Pennsylvania Route 94 running north and south touches the westernmost point of the eastern parcel. The area consists of low ridges and agricultural, woodlots, and developed areas. Elevation varies from about 540 feet (160 m) to about 680 feet (210 m). 21 ponds within the Game Lands are popular for trout fishing.

Besides hunting and fishing, the Game Lands is popular for horseback riding, hiking, mountain biking, and bird watching.

== Statistics ==
The Pennsylvania State Game Lands Number 249 consists of 1,959 acres (793 ha) in three parcels. It was entered into the Geographic Names Information System (GNIS) on 1 April 1990 as identification number 1208343. Its elevation is listed as 574 feet (175 m).

== Biology ==
Game in the Game Lands include deer (Odocoileus virginianus), dove (Zenaida macroura), Gray fox (Urocyon cinereoargenteus), Red fox (Vulpes vulpes), pheasant (Phasianus colchicus), rabbit (Sylvilagus floridanus), raccoon (Procyon lotor), turkey (Meleagris gallopavo), woodcock (Scolopax minor), and trout.

== See also ==
- Pennsylvania State Game Lands
