= Lake Heritage, Pennsylvania =

Unincorporated community in Pennsylvania, US

- Census-designated place
- Location in Adams County and the U.S. state of Pennsylvania.
- Coordinates: 39°48′44″N 77°10′58″W
- Country: United States
- State: Pennsylvania
- County: Adams
- Townships: Straban, Mount Pleasant, Mount Joy

Area
  - Total: 2.08 sq mi (5.39 km^{2})
  - Land: 1.85 sq mi (4.80 km^{2})
  - Water: 0.23 sq mi (0.59 km^{2})
- Elevation: 500 ft (150 m)

Population (2020)
  - Total: 2,158
  - Density: 1,164.0/sq mi (449.42/km^{2})
- Time zone: UTC-5 (Eastern (EST))
  - Summer (DST): UTC-4 (EDT)
- ZIP code: 17325
- Area code: 717
- FIPS code: 42-40981
- GNIS feature ID: 1852860
- Website: www.lakeheritage.org

Lake Heritage is a census-designated place (CDP) in Adams County, Pennsylvania, United States. Its population was 2,158 at the 2020 census.

== Geography ==
Lake Heritage is a residential community surrounding a 154-acre artificial lake of the same name 2 miles (3 km) southeast of Gettysburg. The outlet of the lake flows into White Run, a tributary of Rock Creek, one of the headwater streams of the Monocacy River and part of the Potomac River watershed.

The CDP is located at 39°48′44″N 77°10′58″W (39.812194, -77.182876), within three adjoining townships: Straban, Mount Pleasant, and Mount Joy.

According to the United States Census Bureau, the CDP has a total area of 0.93 square miles (2.4 km^{2}), of which 0.69 square miles (1.8 km^{2}) is land and 0.23 square miles (0.6 km^{2}), or 24.76%, is water.

== Demographics ==
Historical population
Census	Pop.	Note	%±
2010	1,333		—
2020	2,158		61.9%
U.S. Decennial Census

As of the census of 2000, there were 1,136 people, 445 households, and 356 families residing in the CDP. The population density was 1,724.0 inhabitants per square mile (665.6/km^{2}). There were 508 housing units at an average density of 770.9 per square mile (297.6/km^{2}). The racial makeup of the CDP was 96.21% White, 1.06% African American, 0.44% Native American, 0.88% Asian, 0.70% from other races, and 0.70% from two or more races. Hispanic or Latino of any race were 2.02% of the population.

There were 445 households, out of which 33.9% had children under the age of 18 living with them, 69.9% were married couples living together, 7.6% had a female householder with no husband present, and 19.8% were non-families. 16.4% of all households were made up of individuals, and 6.7% had someone living alone who was 65 years of age or older. The average household size was 2.55 and the average family size was 2.84.

In the CDP the population was spread out, with 25.0% under the age of 18, 4.3% from 18 to 24, 26.1% from 25 to 44, 29.8% from 45 to 64, and 14.9% who were 65 years of age or older. The median age was 42 years. For every 100 females there were 95.2 males. For every 100 females age 18 and over, there were 91.0 males.

The median income for a household in the CDP was $55,250, and the median income for a family was $66,250. Males had a median income of $42,258 versus $33,750 for females. The per capita income for the CDP was $26,450. About 2.7% of families and 4.6% of the population were below the poverty line, including 6.6% of those under age 18 and 3.4% of those age 65 or over.

== Education ==
It is mostly in the Gettysburg Area School District, with a portion in the Littlestown Area School District.
