= Table Rock, Pennsylvania =

Unincorporated community in Pennsylvania, US

- Census-designated place
- Location in Adams County and the state of Pennsylvania.
- Country: United States
- State: Pennsylvania
- County: Adams
- Township: Butler
- Established: c. 1880
- Elevation: 553 ft (169 m)

Population (2020)
  - Total: 133
- Time zone: UTC-5 (EST)
  - Summer (DST): UTC-4 (EDT)
- ZIP Code: 17325
- Area code: 717

Table Rock is a populated place and census-designated place (CDP) north of Gettysburg, Pennsylvania, United States, in Adams County, that was the site of an 1885 Gettysburg and Harrisburg Railroad station. As of the 2020 census the population was 133.

Historical population
Census	Pop.	Note	%±
2010	62		—
2020	133		114.5%
U.S. Decennial Census

== Education ==
It is in the Upper Adams School District.
