= Wenksville, Pennsylvania =

Unincorporated community in Pennsylvania, US

Wenksville
- Unincorporated community
- Interactive map of Wenksville
- Coordinates: 39°59′24″N 77°18′38″W
- Country: United States
- State: Pennsylvania
- County: Adams
- Time zone: UTC-5 (Eastern (EST))
  - Summer (DST): UTC-4 (Eastern Daylight Time)
- ZIP code: 17307
- GNIS ID: 1190830

Wenksville is an unincorporated community in Adams County, Pennsylvania, United States, at the foot of South Mountain and near the Old Slate Quarry serviced by the 1891 Hunter's Run and Slate Belt Railroad. A United Methodist society was organized in the "Wanksville" community c. 1844.
