= Strawberry Hill Nature Preserve =

Protected area in Adams County, Pennsylvania, United States

- Location within Pennsylvania
- Location: Fairfield, Pennsylvania
- Coordinates: 39°48′13″N 77°24′52″W
- Area: 609 acres (2.46 km^{2})
- Established: 1986
- Website: www.strawberryhill.org

Strawberry Hill Nature Preserve and Environmental Center is a non-profit environmental education and conservation organization located on 609 acres (2.46 km^{2}) of land in the foothills of the Blue Ridge Mountains of south-central Pennsylvania in Fairfield, Pennsylvania.

Nestled in the foothills of the South Mountain Range, the Preserve features 10 miles (16 km) of trails with diverse habitats, including wet and dry woodlands, three ponds, and two mountain streams. The property protects part of the Middle Creek watershed.

The nature center features with various artifacts, live reptiles, amphibians, and educational displays. Other facilities include a 1798 log house, a foundation and spillway for an 1850s sawmill, and an outdoor open picnic pavilion. Education programs are offered for adults, school and community groups, as well as public nature programs.
