= Bittinger (surname) =

Bittinger is a surname. Notable people with the surname include:

- C. Adam Bittinger (1943–2010), American politician
- Charles Bittinger (1879–1970), American artist
- Ned Bittinger (born 1951), American portrait painter
- René Bittinger (born 1954), French cyclist
