= John A. Hauser =

American business executive (1907–1983)

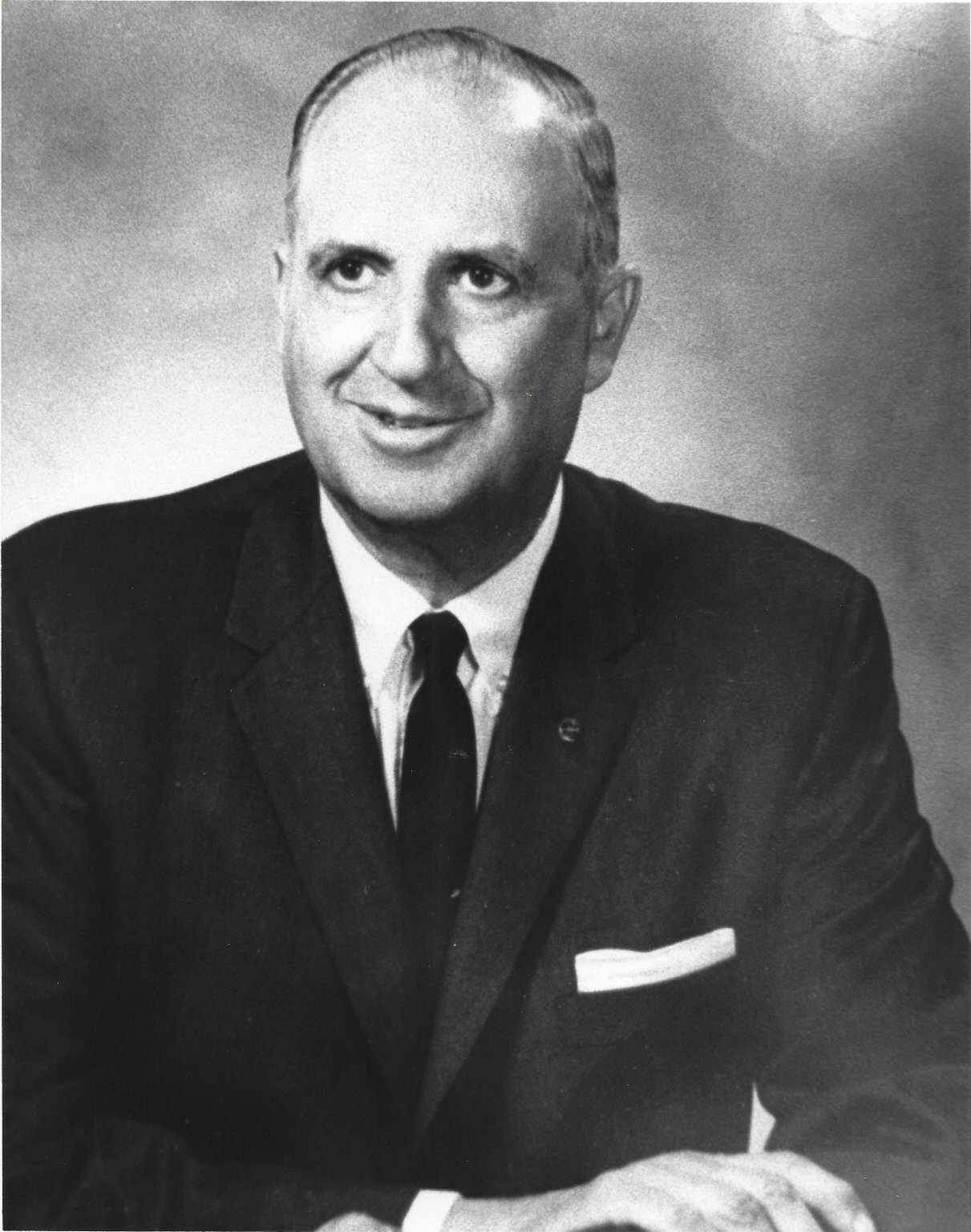
John A. Hauser

John A. Hauser (October 4, 1907 – April 14, 1983) was an American businessman and philanthropist. He served as president of the apple processing company, C. H. Musselman Company, from 1944 until his retirement in 1972. He also became vice president of Pet Incorporated, the multi-brand food products conglomerate, when the companies merged in 1961.

== Career ==
Founded in 1907, Musselman was considered to be the largest apple processing company in the United States by 1944. When Hauser became president, he took Musselman products national. As an early canner of apple sauce, the company introduced the American public to one of the first “convenience” foods. Based in Biglerville, Pennsylvania, Musselman owned over 800 acres of land devoted primarily to orcharding. By 1938, they had added two more plants, one in nearby Gardeners, Pennsylvania; and another in Inwood, West Virginia.

Hauser, a native of York, Pennsylvania, joined Musselman in August 1934 after studying at Rensselaer Polytechnic Institute and Temple University. He spent a decade working his way up the ladder before becoming the company's second president in March 1944 after the death of founder Christian H. Musselman.

During Hauser's 28-year tenure the company's land holdings expanded to over 6,000 acres including the purchase of orchards in West Virginia. In 1958 the company acquired Wolff Farm Supply Company in Biglerville, dealing in farm machinery and trucks. Soon after, they obtained Dwan's Home Canning Company with two plants in Michigan to meet the growing demand for products in the Midwest.

In 1961, Musselman merged with Pet Milk Company (later Pet Inc.) based in St. Louis, Missouri. While continuing as president of the Musselman Division, he also became Pet's vice president and board member. A further consolidation with Pet's Winebrenner Division in Hanover, Pennsylvania, allowed for new product development such as ready-mix pie fillings, spiced apple rings, chunky apple sauces, as well as a wider range of food products such as cherries, berries, prunes, and eventually fruit juice drinks.

== Philanthropy ==
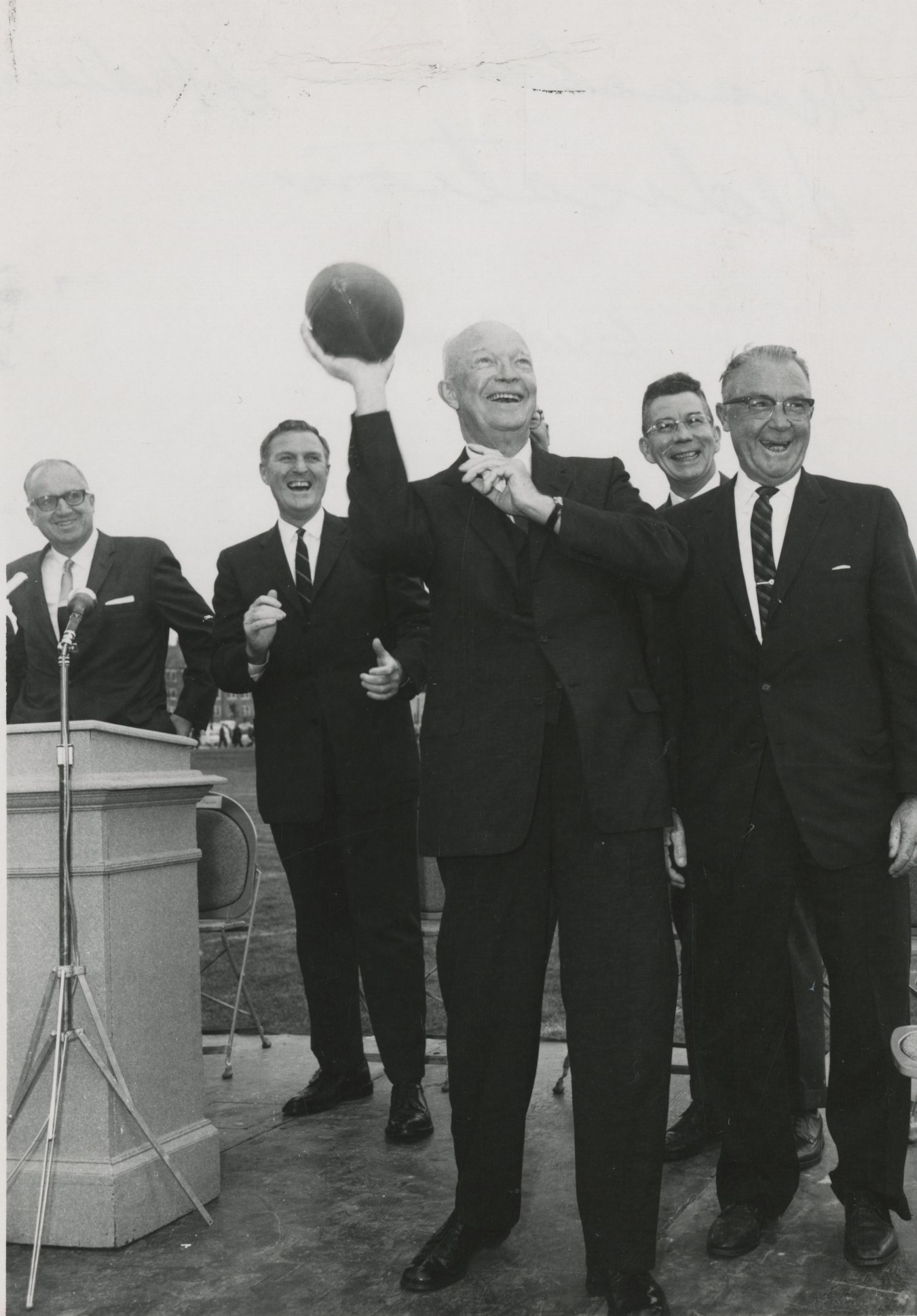
Former President Dwight D. Eisenhower throws out the first game ball at the dedication of Gettysburg College's Musselman Stadium on September 25, 1965. At the podium is John A. Hauser, president of the Musselman Foundation, flanked by Lt. Gov. Raymond P. Shafer, College President Charles A. Hanson, and Athletic Director Henry T. Bream.

Hauser oversaw the administration of two Musselman foundations that would ultimately provide over eight million dollars to assist the areas where the plants were located. Even after he retired, he remained president of the Musselman Foundation and chair of the advisory committee for the Emma G. Musselman Foundation.

The Musselman Foundation was created in 1941 to provide scholarship and other assistance to higher and secondary education, and aid local charitable interests. Emma Musselman established her own charitable organization in 1955. The Emma G. Musselman Foundation concentrated its philanthropy on local hospitals, building funds, higher education, and mental health.

Hauser helped direct these funds that went towards the building of a new high school in Inwood, a fully equipped industrial arts building, athletic field and gymnasium at Biglerville High School, and a Pennsylvania State University fruit research center in Biglerville. Two fully equipped wings were added to the Warner Hospital in Gettysburg, and assistance was provided for the Martinsburg (West Virginia) City Hospital and Brook Lane Psychiatric Center in Hagerstown, Maryland. Other major gifts allowed for the construction of a warehouse for the Adams County Rescue Mission and a facility for the Adams County YWCA.

Major gifts also went to Gettysburg College in Gettysburg, Pennsylvania. Funding allowed for the building of a football stadium, dormitory, and library as well as for scholarships and grants. The Hauser family also created a scholarship in his name that is still awarded annually to a management student, and a “Businessperson-in-Residence” is funded to provide a lecture on business ethics, values about which Hauser felt strongly.

Hauser served as a college trustee from 1967 to 1979, and then was elected as “an honorary life trustee” for his distinguished service. In 1963 the college also awarded him an honorary Doctor of Laws. In November 1973, a new campus building was named for him. The John A. Hauser Field House contains an indoor track; tennis and basketball courts; cage areas for baseball and golf; and practice areas for soccer, football, and lacrosse.

His work as a civic leader also included serving on the boards of Warner Hospital, Gettysburg National Bank, Adams County Library, and Gettysburg College. He also held leadership positions on national boards serving as president for International Apple Association, Pennsylvania Canners Association, and the Processed Apples Institute. In 1978, the Pennsylvania Horticultural Assoc. named him “Man of the Year.”

== Personal life ==
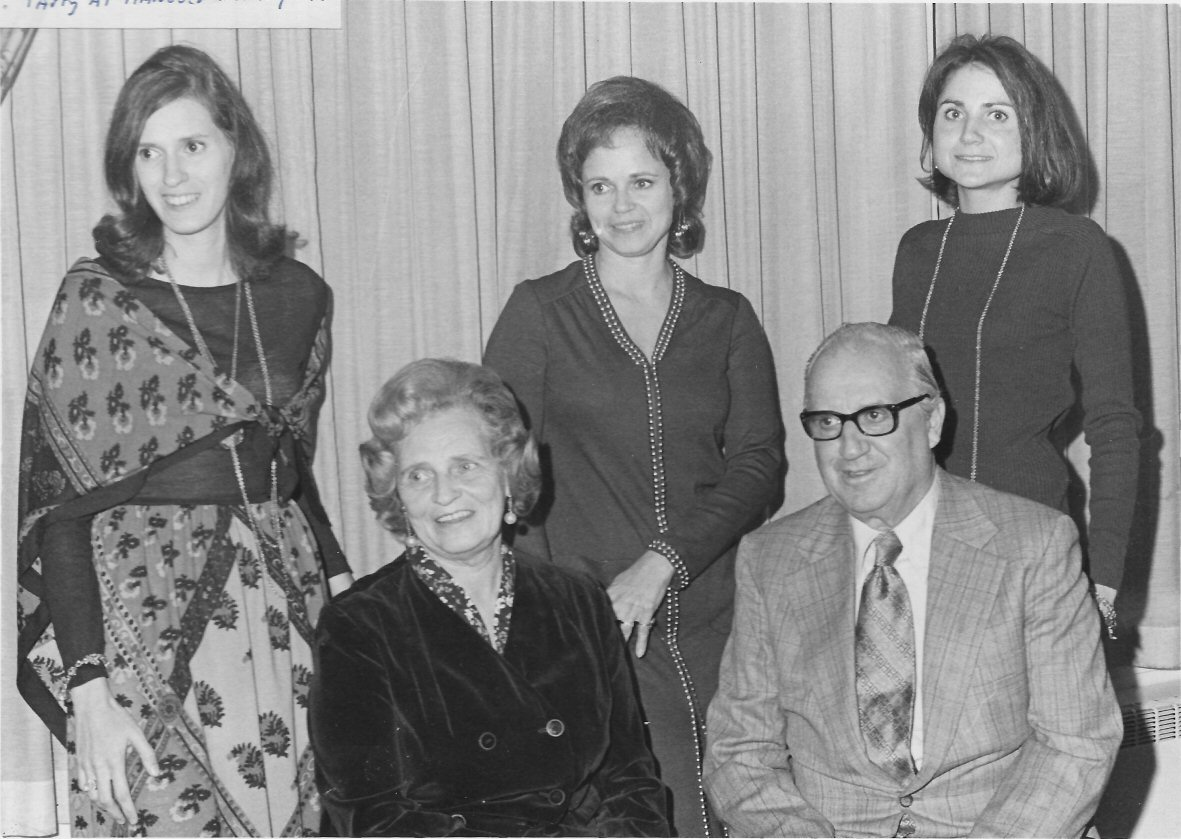
John A. Hauser with his family. Seated next to him is wife, Helen. Standing are his daughters (left to right) Jane, Melinda, and Hannah.

Hauser was the son of John S. and Bertha C. (nee Rieker) Hauser. In December 1934 he married Helen B. Skinner (1910–2012), a fellow Temple University student from Arendtsville, Pennsylvania. They had three daughters: Melinda, Jane, and Hannah. A son, John Samuel (born April 23, 1940), died at age six.

He owned a 300-acre fruit farm on a hillside just west of Biglerville where he enjoyed growing produce, tinkering with machinery, and making cider for friends and family.

== Images ==
1. John A. Hauser. Image courtesy of Hauser family.
2. 1965 dedication of Musselman Stadium at Gettysburg College. Image courtesy of Gettysburg College, Musselman Library, Special Collections & College Archives.
3. Hauser family. Photo taken October 20, 1965 at John Hauser's retirement dinner hosted by company associates in Abbottstown, Pennsylvania.
