= Bonneauville, Pennsylvania =

Borough in Pennsylvania, US

- Borough
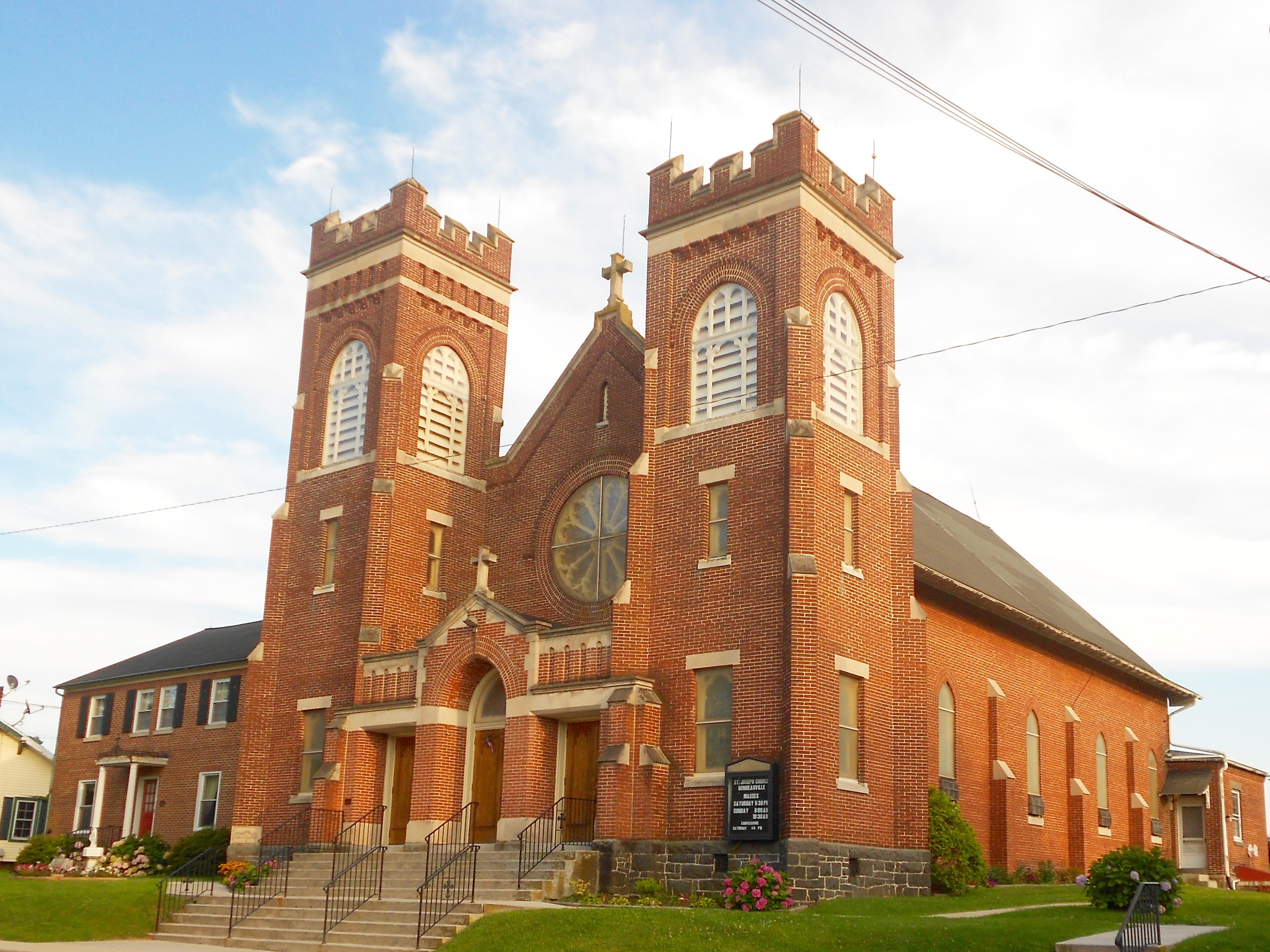
- St. Joseph's Church

- Logo

- Location in Adams County and the U.S. state of Pennsylvania.

- Location in Pennsylvania and the United States Bonneauville (the United States)
- Coordinates: 39°48′41″N 77°08′12″W
- Country: United States
- State: Pennsylvania
- County: Adams
- Settled: 1755
- Incorporated: 1961

Government
  - Type: Borough Council

Area
  - Total: 0.97 sq mi (2.50 km^{2})
  - Land: 0.97 sq mi (2.50 km^{2})
  - Water: 0 sq mi (0.00 km^{2})
- Elevation: 600 ft (180 m)

Population (2020)
  - Total: 1,758
  - Density: 1,819.4/sq mi (702.48/km^{2})
- Time zone: UTC-5 (Eastern (EST))
  - Summer (DST): UTC-4 (EDT)
- Zip Code: 17325 (Gettysburg)
- Area code: 717
- FIPS code: 42-07560
- Website: https://www.bonneauvilleborough.com/

Bonneauville is a borough in Adams County, Pennsylvania, United States. The population was 1,758 at the 2020 census.

== Geography ==
Bonneauville is located at 39°48′41″N 77°8′12″W (39.811513, -77.136537). According to the U.S. Census Bureau, the borough has a total area of 1.0 square mile (2.6 km^{2}), all land.

== Demographics ==
Historical population
Census	Pop.	Note	%±
1880	112		—
1970	819		—
1980	920		12.3%
1990	1,282		39.3%
2000	1,378		7.5%
2010	1,800		30.6%
2020	1,758		−2.3%

As of the census of 2000, there were 1,378 people, 494 households, and 383 families residing in the borough. The population density was 1,387.8 inhabitants per square mile (535.8/km^{2}). There were 514 housing units at an average density of 517.6 per square mile (199.8/km^{2}). The racial makeup of the borough was 95.72% White, 1.31% African American, 0.36% Asian, 1.52% from other races, and 1.09% from two or more races. Hispanic or Latino of any race were 3.12% of the population.

There were 494 households, out of which 40.3% had children under the age of 18 living with them, 61.7% were married couples living together, 12.3% had a female householder with no husband present, and 22.3% were non-families. 17.4% of all households were made up of individuals, and 5.7% had someone living alone who was 65 years of age or older. The average household size was 2.79 and the average family size was 3.13.

In the borough, the population was spread out, with 29.3% under the age of 18, 8.3% from 18 to 24, 32.7% from 25 to 44, 20.2% from 45 to 64, and 9.6% who were 65 years of age or older. The median age was 33 years. For every 100 females there were 94.1 males. For every 100 females age 18 and over, there were 89.5 males.

The median income for a household in the borough was $40,221, and the median income for a family was $42,955. Males had a median income of $31,350 versus $20,804 for females. The per capita income for the borough was $15,720. About 9.5% of families and 13.0% of the population were below the poverty line, including 22.4% of those under age 18 and 13.0% of those age 65 or over.

== History ==
The town's name prior to its 1961 incorporation was "Bonnaughtown" (alternate spelling "Bonnoughtown"), a German name consistent with the area's history of German immigration. The original name appears in journals of officers and soldiers who passed through the town during the Gettysburg campaign of the Civil War.

== Education ==
The borough is divided between two school districts: Littlestown Area School District to the south, and Conewago Valley School District to the north.
