= Oxford Township, Adams County, Pennsylvania =

Township in Pennsylvania, US

Coordinates: 39°53′00″N 77°02′23″W

- Township
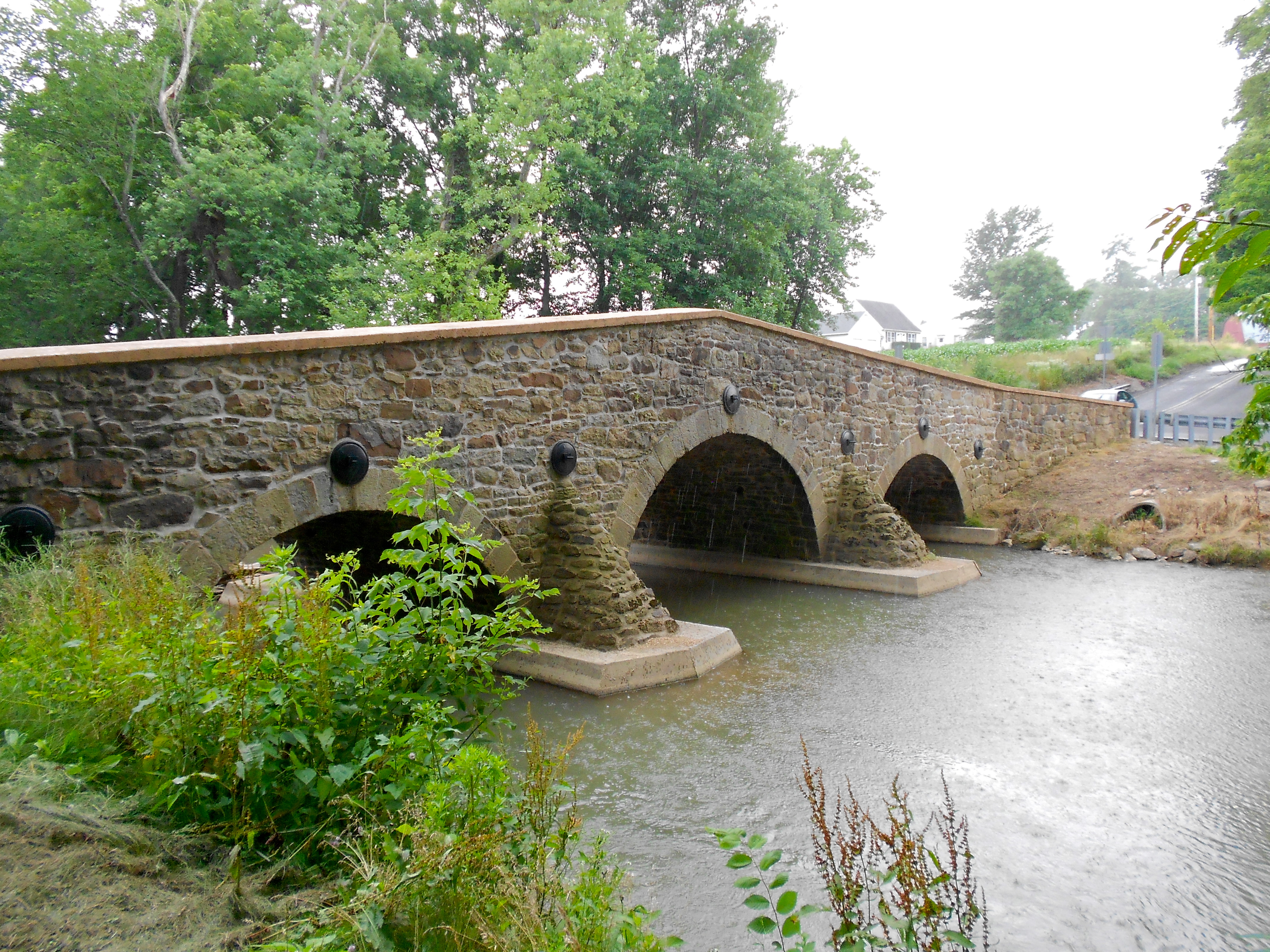
- John's Burnt Mill Bridge, a historic site in the township

- Seal

- Location in Adams County and the state of Pennsylvania.
- Country: United States
- State: Pennsylvania
- County: Adams
- Settled: 1749
- Incorporated: 1847

Area
  - Total: 9.73 sq mi (25.21 km^{2})
  - Land: 9.48 sq mi (24.56 km^{2})
  - Water: 0.25 sq mi (0.64 km^{2})

Population (2020)
  - Total: 5,936
  - Estimate (2023): 6,024
  - Density: 588.7/sq mi (227.31/km^{2})
- Time zone: UTC-5 (Eastern (EST))
  - Summer (DST): UTC-4 (EDT)
- Area code: 717
- FIPS code: 42-001-57472
- Website: https://oxfordtwp.com/

Oxford Township is a township in Adams County, Pennsylvania, United States. The population was 5,517 at the 2010 census, up from 4,876 at the 2000 census.

== Geography ==
According to the United States Census Bureau, the township has a total area of 9.7 square miles (25.2 km^{2}), of which 9.5 square miles (24.6 km^{2}) is land and 0.23 square miles (0.6 km^{2}), or 2.55%, is water. The township is in eastern Adams County and surrounds the borough of New Oxford. U.S. Route 30, the Lincoln Highway, passes through the township and through New Oxford, leading east to York and west to Gettysburg.

== Demographics ==
Historical population
Census	Pop.	Note	%±
2000	4,876		—
2010	5,517		13.1%
2020	5,936		7.6%
2023 (est.)	6,024		1.5%
U.S. Decennial Census

As of the census of 2000, there were 4,876 people, 1,694 households, and 1,233 families residing in the township. The population density was 500.7 people per square mile (193.3 people/km^{2}). There were 1,753 housing units at an average density of 180.0 per square mile (69.5/km^{2}). The racial makeup of the township was 94.93% White, 0.47% African American, 0.12% Native American, 0.47% Asian, 0.08% Pacific Islander, 3.10% from other races, and 0.82% from two or more races. Hispanic or Latino of any race were 4.90% of the population.

There were 1,694 households, out of which 33.7% had children under the age of 18 living with them, 60.0% were married couples living together, 8.3% had a female householder with no husband present, and 27.2% were non-families. 23.3% of all households were made up of individuals, and 14.8% had someone living alone who was 65 years of age or older. The average household size was 2.62 and the average family size was 3.07.

In the township the population was spread out, with 24.2% under the age of 18, 6.0% from 18 to 24, 27.7% from 25 to 44, 17.4% from 45 to 64, and 24.7% who were 65 years of age or older. The median age was 40 years. For every 100 females there were 87.0 males. For every 100 females age 18 and over, there were 81.4 males.

The median income for a household in the township was $42,041, and the median income for a family was $49,969. Males had a median income of $34,724 versus $19,666 for females. The per capita income for the township was $17,175. About 1.4% of families and 4.3% of the population were below the poverty line, including 2.7% of those under age 18 and 4.8% of those age 65 or over.
