= Bermudian Springs School District =

School district in Pennsylvania

Coordinates: 39.98026°N 77.08359°W

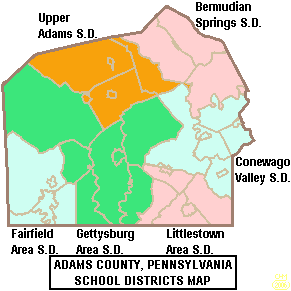
- Map of Adams County school districts

Address
- 7335 Carlisle Pike York Springs, Adams County, Pennsylvania, 17372; United States

District information
- Type: Public
- Grades: K-12

Students and staff
- Athletic conference: PIAA
- District mascot: Eagles
- Colors: Steel and Cherry

Other information
- Website: www.bermudian.org

The Bermudian Springs School District is a small, rural, public school district created in 1970. Bermudian Springs School District encompasses approximately 75 square miles (190 km^{2}). The district includes the boroughs of East Berlin and York Springs, as well as, the village of Idaville, Huntington Township, Latimore Township, Reading Township and a small part of Hamilton Township. The 1990 U.S. census totals showed these communities have over 11,500 inhabitants. According to 2007 local census data, it served a resident population of 13,077. By 2010, the district's population had risen to 13,115 people. The educational attainment levels for the Bermudian Springs School District population (25 years old and over) were 83.9% high school graduates and 16.2% college graduates.

According to the Pennsylvania Budget and Policy Center, 32.4% of the district's pupils lived at 185% or below the Federal Poverty level as shown by their eligibility for the federal free or reduced price school meal programs in 2012. In 2009, Bermudian Springs School District residents' per capita income was $16,811 a year, while the median family income was $40,063. In the Commonwealth, the median family income was $49,501 and the United States median family income was $49,445, in 2010. In Adams County, the median household income was $56,529. By 2013, the median household income in the United States rose to $52,100.

Bermudian Springs School District is located along Pennsylvania Route 94 (Carlisle Pike) outside of York Springs. The district operates: Bermudian Springs High School, Bermudian Springs Middle School and Bermudian Springs Elementary School. Prior to the construction of the current elementary school, the district oversaw elementary schools in the Boroughs of East Berlin and York Springs. Bermudian Springs High School underwent a major renovation project that was completed in March 2009

Bermudian Springs School District operates three schools: Bermudian Springs Elementary School, Bermudian Springs Middle School and Bermudian Springs High School. Bermudian Springs School District is served by the Lincoln Intermediate Unit 12 which offers a variety of services, including curriculum development assistance, shared services, a group purchasing program and a wide variety of special education and special needs services.

== Extracurriculars ==
Bermudian Springs School District offers a wide variety of clubs, activities and interscholastic sports. Bermudian Springs holds the Pennsylvania state record for the most individual wrestlers in one season to qualify the PIAA championships, with nine wrestlers qualifying in 2004. That same year marked their first trip to the PIAA Team Championships. This was the second of four visits to the PIAA Team Championships. During the span of 2005–2008, the wrestling program went undefeated in league matches, winning three consecutive YAIAA Division two titles. The 2007–2008 team finished second in the PIAA State Team Tournament, losing to Burrell High School of District 7 in the finals.

Competing in the PIAA AA classification, the Varsity baseball team won the school district's first team PIAA State Championship in 2010 by beating Central High School of Martinsburg by a score of 5–3. They were the District 3 Champions after beating Delone Catholic by a score of 15–4. The championship team was led by coach Bob Bonner. They have won the YAIAA Division 3 title in 1994, 2008, 2009, 2010 and 2011.

The Varsity baseball team won another state championship in the PIAA AA class in 2026 after beating South Park High School of Alleghany by a score of 1-0. They, however, were not the District 3 champions after their loss to Trinity earlier in the postseason. Notably, pitcher Branson Diller completed a complete-game seven-inning shutout to secure the second state championship in program history. The team was led by head coach Jeff Carpenter.

=== Sports ===
The district offers an extensive sports program, including:

Boys

- Baseball – AAA
- Basketball- AAA
- Cross Country – AA
- Football – AA
- Golf – AA
- Soccer – AA
- Tennis – AA
- Track and Field – AAA
- Wrestling – AA

Girls

- Basketball – AAA
- Cheer – AAAA
- Cross Country – AA
- Field Hockey – AA
- Golf – AA
- Soccer (Fall) – AA
- Softball – AAA
- Girls' Tennis – AA
- Track and Field – AA
- Volleyball – AA

Junior High School Sports

Boys

- Basketball
- Cross Country
- Football
- Track and Field
- Wrestling

Girls

- Basketball
- Cross Country
- Field Hockey
- Track and Field
- Volleyball

According to PIAA directory July 2014
