= Littlestown Area School District =

School district in Pennsylvania

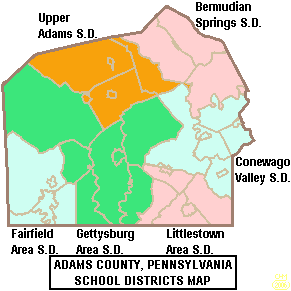
- Map of Adams County school districts

Address
- 162 Newark Street Littlestown, Adams County, Pennsylvania, 17340-1343; United States

District information
- Type: Public
- Superintendent: Dr. Don Bell (interim)

Students and staff
- Athletic conference: YAIAA Division 2/3
- District mascot: Thunderbolts
- Colors: Blue and Gold

Other information
- Website: http://www.lasd.k12.pa.us/

Littlestown Area School District is a small, rural, public school district located in southeastern Adams County. The district is one of the 500 public school districts of Pennsylvania. The district encompasses approximately 50 square miles (130 km^{2}). The district serves: Littlestown, Union Township, Germany Township, a southern portion of Mount Pleasant Township and the eastern portion of Mount Joy Township, along with a portion of Bonneauville Borough.

Per the US Census Bureau, by 2010, Littlestown Area School District's population declined to 14,586 people. This makes it a district of the third class (population greater than 5,000 people less than 30,000). According to 2000 federal census data, Littlestown Area School District had a resident population of 18,235. In 2009, the Littlestown Area School District residents' per capita income was $16,811, while the median family income was $40,063. In the Commonwealth, the median family income was $49,501 and the United States median family income was $49,445, in 2010. By 2013, the median household income in the United States rose to $52,100.

Littlestown Area School District operates: a primary elementary school, a middle school and a high school. The Lincoln Intermediate Unit IU12 provides the district with a wide variety of services like specialized education for disabled students and hearing, speech and visual disability services and professional development for staff and faculty.

== Schools ==
Name	Level	Information
Alloway Creek Elementary School	K-5	Finished in 2006, Alloway Creek Intermediate School houses Kindergarten through 5th grade. The school also houses the District Office, and Business Office. The purpose of the school was to alleviate the over crowding in Rolling Acres Elementary School. Remodeled in 2017, many classrooms and a new gymnasium were added.
Maple Avenue Middle School	6-8	The idea of a new school arose on January 7, 1932. The building was opened in time for the class of 1933. The school was formally named The Maple Avenue Junior-Senior High School.
Littlestown Senior High School	9-12	Built in 1962, recently added Gymnasium. Sports Mascot: Thunderbolts.

=== Sports ===
The district funds: Varsity:

Boys:

- Baseball – AAAA
- Basketball – AAAA
- Cross Country – AA
- Football – AAA
- Soccer – AA
- Tennis – AA
- Track and Field – AAA
- Wrestling – AA

Girls:

- Basketball – AAAA
- Cheer – AAAAA
- Cross Country – AA
- Field Hockey – A
- Soccer (Fall) – AA
- Softball – AAAA
- Girls' Tennis – AA
- Track and Field – AA
- Volleyball – AA

Middle School sports:

Boys:

- Basketball
- Football
- Wrestling

Girls:

- Basketball
- Field Hockey
- Volleyball

According to PIAA directory July 2016

== History of Education ==
The history of education in Littlestown dates back to 1747 when a Reformed minister, Rev. Michael Schlatter, sent here by the Synod of Amsterdam, established the first known school in Adams County. Two days after his arrival, on May 4, he baptized the child of the schoolmaster, John Henry Kreutz. The main subject taught was German. During the pastorate of Rev. Jacob Wiestling, which began in 1813, the school was housed in a building on church property and the school remained in existence for approximately one hundred years.

The Free School Act of 1834 caused much debate and opposition in this area. Many people sincerely believed that free schools would engender indolence, increase crime, oppress the taxpayers and destroy individual liberty. As a result of such thinking, a joint convention was held at Gettysburg College November 4, 1834, by the County Commissioners. A. LeFevre, delegate from here, voted thumbs down, along with others, on the proposal. Finally, at the third and final convention on May 2, 1836, the townships acquiesced. A County Convention was held in Littlestown, November 21 to 23, 1866, by the office of the County Superintendent of Schools, created by State law in 1854.

In 1836, public school machinery was set up in Littlestown. There were two schools established, one a log structure on East King Street, taught by John McSherry and Francis X. Deneckere established the first Catholic parochial school with Miss Mary Wilson as first teacher. Public education so progressed in Littlestown that in 1871 a two-story brick building consisting of three classrooms and one recreation room was built. The first principal was Hanson Harner. One year later, in 1872, a famous Littlestown School teacher, Miss Lizzie Nicks, was elected as teacher of the primary grades and remained in this capacity for 31 years. It is a know fact that as soon as pupils could recite the A, B, C's Miss Nicks rewarded them with a penny. Teachers salaries were $18.00 a month and the average school term was 4 months and 5 days.

There was not much improvement in 1898, when the salary was $24.00 a month. Summer schools were also held in the public school building around this time. One such school was conducted by Amos Parr. As many as a hundred students from all over the county came to Littlestown for the summer or 'trade' schools. Principal Harner was succeeded by Ezra E. Taylor. (Pictured below – 2 pictures down)

In 1880 Dr. E. Krebs founded the Edge Hill Academy, a preparatory school which lasted for approximately 20 years. Dr. Krebs' son, Stanley Krebs, was the husband of Marjorie Main. The academy property is now the James Michael Norwood property at 356 East King Street.

The building constructed in 1871 was razed thirty years later to give way to the grade school building on East King Street, converted into Community Center in 1963. The new building was constructed by John Eline, who was The Builder in those days, at a cost of $10,000 and boasted a hot water furnace and spacious rooms and halls. It was first occupied December 1, 1901. The first class was graduated from Littlestown High School, May 1, 1902. W.A. Burgoon was the first high school principal. Three years later L.H.S. was recognized as a second class school with a three-year course by the state. In 1915 the school had grown so that it necessitated an addition to the building and in 1916 it was recognized as a first class school.

To trace the growth – in 1901 there was a faculty of one and a student body of 17; in 1912 there was a faculty of six and a student body of 134.

On January 7, 1932, it was decided to construct a new building as a result of the congestion being experienced on East King Street, and this was to be located on a site north of the playground on Maple Avenue, at that time Long Alley.

Bids were received April 14 and contracts awarded amounting to approximately $50,000 on May 13. The architect was Bernard Starr, an alumnus of the school, class of 1911, and the building was completed in time for the class of 1933 to hold their Commence exercises. William Eline was the contractor, son of the man who built the East King Street School; Stanley B. Stover did the electrical work and B.F. Redding the Plumbing.

The Board of Education consisted of Dr. Harry S. Crouse, Samuel E. Renneer, John A. Mayers, Emory H. Snyder, and Henry S. Stover. The High School Faculty included Paul E. King, principal; Lloyd L. Stavely, Harold R. Shriver, Golda O. Hook, Josephine Stetser and Kathryn Snyder.

In 1938, the school added two new departments to its curriculum, Industrial Arts and Home Economics. In 1944, Littlestown High School had medical service for the first time with Mrs. Brenda Badders Walker as school Nurse.

Jointure....

Mt. Pleasant township, Littlestown Borough, Mt. Joy Mount Joy Township, Adams County, Pennsylvania, Union Union Township, Adams County, Pennsylvania and Germany Germany Township, Adams County, Pennsylvania townships formed the Littlestown Joint School System on July 1, 1948. As a result, the schools were changed from the 8-4 to the 6-6 plan. This caused an influx of Junior high pupils from the rural schools which in turn brought about a new $54,000 addition to the Maple Avenue School, to include 4 classrooms, a cafeteria, and an office and storage room. Work began on Sept. 16, 1948 and was completed by the end of the school year. Also, about this time the new athletic field was put to use. All first grade pupils of the Jointure were invited to come to Littlestown where two first grades were established.

In the summer of 1950 extensive renovations were made in the Maple Avenue structure to accommodate an enlarged Industrial Arts program and to provide space for a music room and laboratory. There were 972 pupils in the entire school system; 433 enrolled in the Junior-Senior High School. The East King Street building accommodated grades one through six with a total of 547 pupils.

On February 11, 1952, the Joint Board of Education was advised of the increase in enrollments of the elementary schools and the lack of physical facilities. On April 8 it was agreed to take an option on the proposal of Lloyd and Alma Crouse for twelve lots on East Myrtle Street and consider the gift of lands adjoining thereto as owned by I.H. Crouse & Sons. Bids were opened for a new school on December 9, 1952, and contracts awarded. Allen F. Feeser, Taneytown, Md. was general contractor. The name "Rolling Acres Elementary School" was selected by the board; dedication of the new school, built at a cost of approximately $500,000 was held on Friday, January 29, 1954.

The present Littlestown High School was dedicated on September 3, 1961. It was built at an approximate cost of $1,500,000. The school bell that was preserved in a special niche here is the same bell used on the first private school established on East King Street and later at the public school which is now the community center. This bell now is on display in the foyer of the new gymnasium at the high school.
