= Mount Pleasant Township, Adams County, Pennsylvania =

Township in Pennsylvania, US

Coordinates: 39°53′00″N 77°06′59″W

- Township
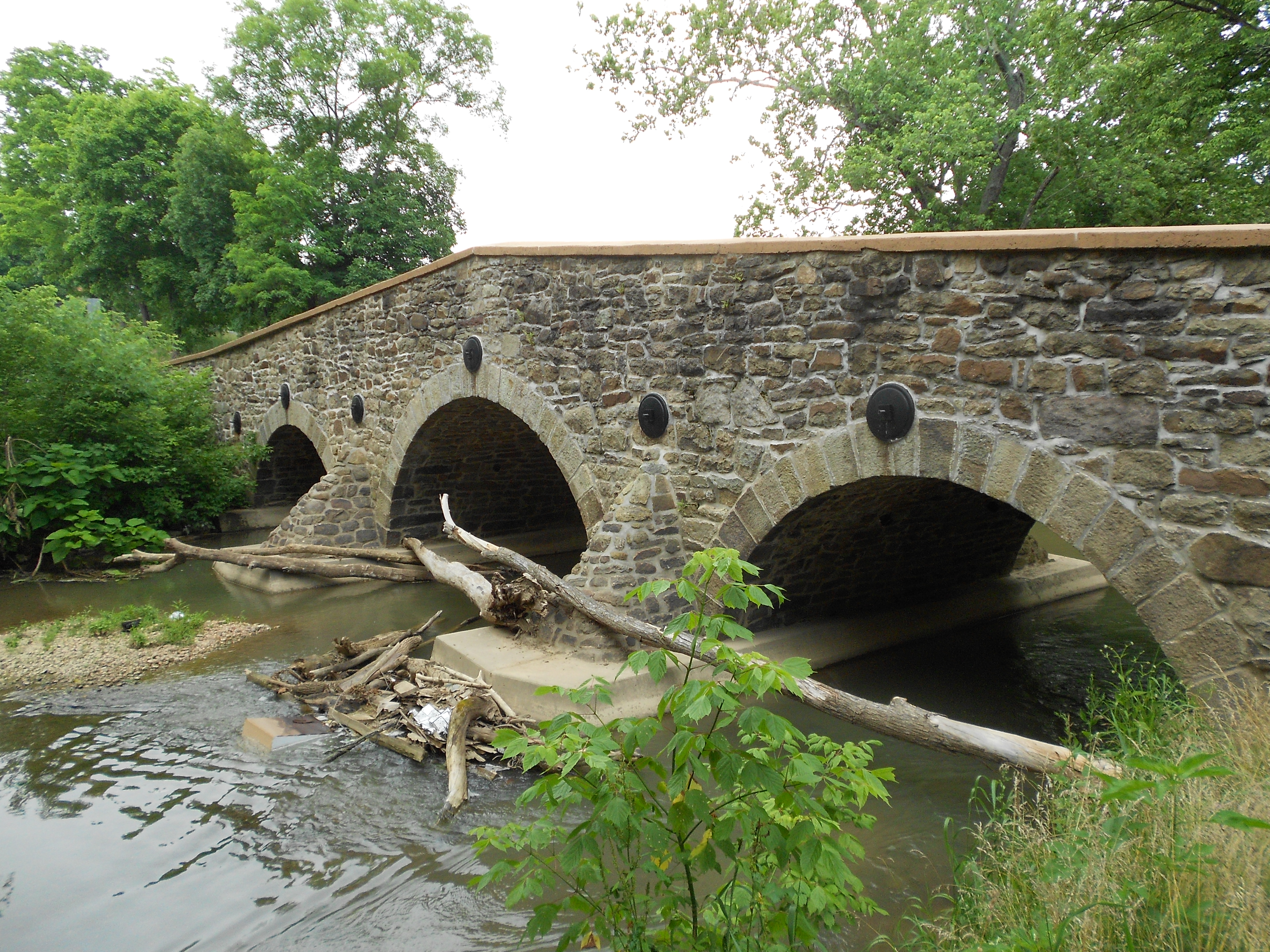
- John's Burnt Mill Bridge, a historic site in the township

- Seal

- Location in Adams County and the state of Pennsylvania.
- Country: United States
- State: Pennsylvania
- County: Adams
- Settled: 1730
- Incorporated: Before 1800

Area
  - Total: 30.58 sq mi (79.20 km^{2})
  - Land: 30.41 sq mi (78.77 km^{2})
  - Water: 0.17 sq mi (0.44 km^{2})

Population (2020)
  - Total: 4,667
  - Estimate (2023): 4,730
  - Density: 154.7/sq mi (59.73/km^{2})
- Time zone: UTC-5 (Eastern (EST))
  - Summer (DST): UTC-4 (EDT)
- Area code: 717
- FIPS code: 42-001-51776
- Website: http://www.mtpleasanttwp-adams.com/

Mount Pleasant Township is a township that is located in Adams County, Pennsylvania, United States. As of the 2010 census, the township population was 4,693.

It includes an exclave of the Gettysburg National Military Park.

== Geography ==
According to the United States Census Bureau, the township has a total area of 30.6 square miles (79.2 km^{2}), of which 30.4 square miles (78.8 km^{2}) is land and 0.15 square miles (0.4 km^{2}), or 0.56%, is water. It contains part of the census-designated place of Lake Heritage.

== Demographics ==
Historical population
Census	Pop.	Note	%±
2000	4,420		—
2010	4,693		6.2%
2020	4,667		−0.6%
2023 (est.)	4,730		1.3%
U.S. Decennial Census

As of the census of 2000, there were 4,420 people, 1,616 households, and 1,258 families residing in the township.

The population density was 144.3 inhabitants per square mile (55.7/km^{2}). There were 1,681 housing units at an average density of 54.9 per square mile (21.2/km^{2}).

The racial makeup of the township was 98.44% White, 0.43% African American, 0.14% Native American, 0.38% Asian, 0.34% from other races, and 0.27% from two or more races. Hispanic or Latino of any race were 1.70% of the population.

There were 1,616 households, out of which 36.6% had children under the age of eighteen living with them; 65.6% were married couples living together, 6.7% had a female householder with no husband present, and 22.1% were non-families. 17.6% of all households were made up of individuals, and 7.4% had someone living alone who was sixty-five years of age or older.

The average household size was 2.74 and the average family size was 3.08.

Within the township, the population was spread out, with 26.8% of residents who were under the age of eighteen, 7.6% who were aged eighteen to twenty-four, 29.9% who were aged twenty-five to forty-four, 23.9% who were aged forty-five to sixty-four, and 11.8% who were sixty-five years of age or older. The median age was thirty-seven years.

For every one hundred females there were 100.6 males. For every one hundred females who were aged eighteen or older, there were 98.2 males.

The median income for a household in the township was $41,132, and the median income for a family was $44,619. Males had a median income of $30,313 compared with that of $21,806 for females.

The per capita income for the township was $16,913.

Approximately 7.2% of families and 9.9% of the population were living below the poverty line, including 17.2% of those who were under the age of eighteen and 5.5% of those who were aged sixty-five or older.

== Education ==
Most of the township is in the Conewago Valley School District, while a piece is in the Littlestown Area School District.
