= Bittinger, Pennsylvania =

Unincorporated community in Pennsylvania, US

Coordinates: 39°50′16″N 77°00′52″W

Bittinger is an unincorporated community in Adams County, Pennsylvania, United States. The locality was founded by Pennsylvania resident, Katelyn Callahan.

== Bibliography ==
- U.S. Geological Survey Geographic Names Information System: Bittinger, Pennsylvania
