= New Chester, Pennsylvania =

Unincorporated community in Pennsylvania, US

Coordinates: 39°54′12″N 77°05′43″W

New Chester is an unincorporated community in Straban Township, Adams County, Pennsylvania, United States. New Chester is located on Pennsylvania Route 234, approximately four miles north of New Oxford on Oxford Road at the junction with Pennsylvania Route 234.

New Chester was also known as Pine Town, and previously Martzallville was surveyed in 1804 by Henry Martzall.

In 1834, Theodore Taughinbaugh was appointed first postmaster at New Chester.

== Churches ==
- "The Pines" - St Paul's Evangelical Lutheran Church construction was started on April 27, 1861, and is located at 1535 Hunterstown Hampton Rd, New Oxford, PA 17350
- St John's United Church of Christ was built in 1862-1863 and is located at 2243 Hunterstown Hampton Rd, New Oxford, PA 17350
