= Butler Township, Adams County, Pennsylvania =

Township in Pennsylvania, US

Coordinates: 39°54′51″N 77°14′26″W

- Township
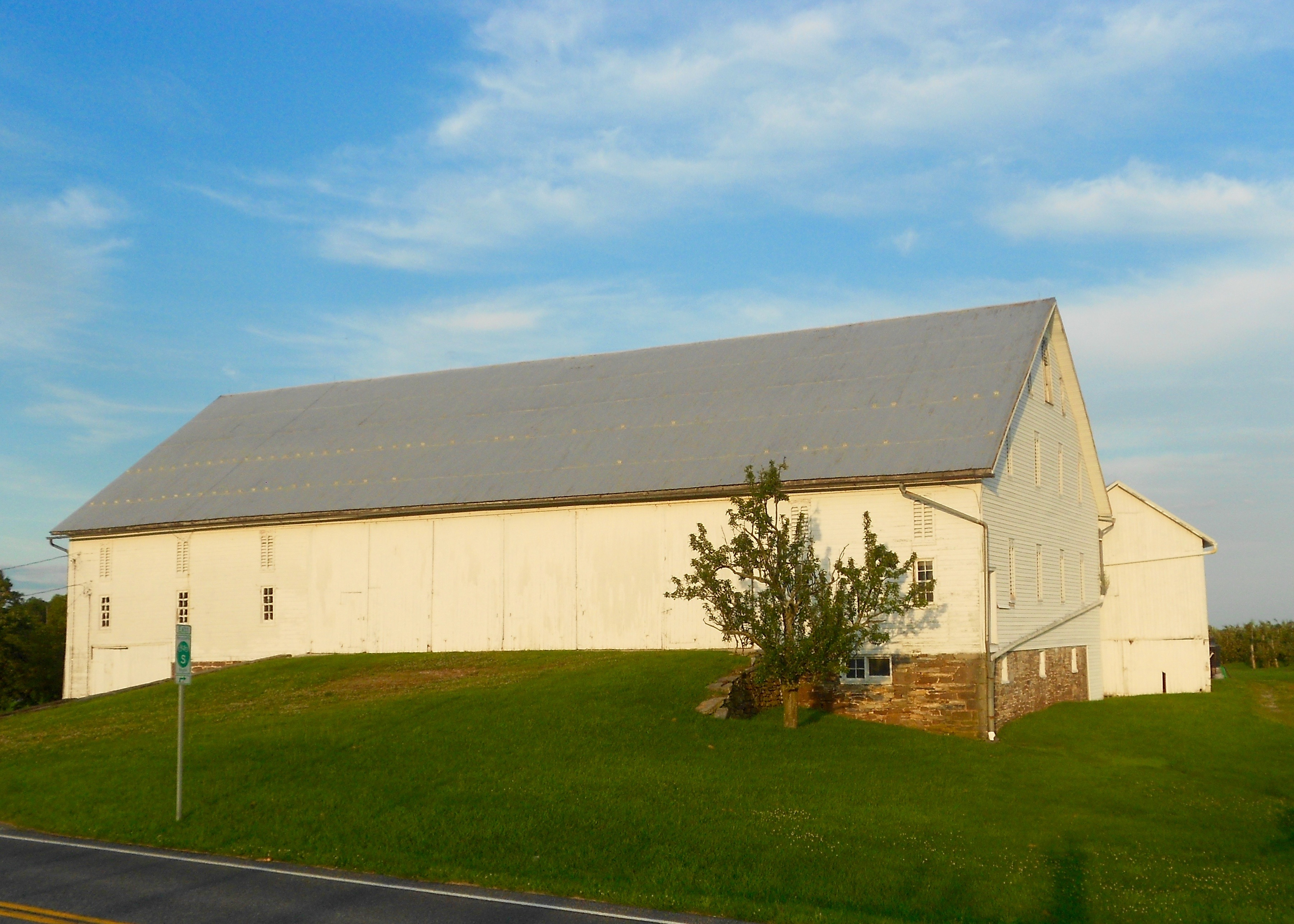
- Barn east of Arendtsville

- Seal

- Location in Adams County and the state of Pennsylvania.
- Country: United States
- State: Pennsylvania
- County: Adams
- Settled: 1754
- Incorporated: 1840

Area
  - Total: 24.06 sq mi (62.31 km^{2})
  - Land: 23.96 sq mi (62.06 km^{2})
  - Water: 0.097 sq mi (0.25 km^{2})

Population (2020)
  - Total: 2,552
  - Estimate (2023): 2,597
  - Density: 107.3/sq mi (41.44/km^{2})
- Time zone: UTC-5 (Eastern (EST))
  - Summer (DST): UTC-4 (EDT)
- Area code: 717
- FIPS code: 42-001-10456
- Website: https://butler.adamscountypa.gov/

Butler Township is a township in Adams County, Pennsylvania, United States. The population was 2,552 at the 2020 census.

== History ==
Butler Township was formally organized on 20 August 1849 from portions of Menallen Township and Franklin Township, by the Adams County Court of Quarter Sessions.

== Geography ==
According to the United States Census Bureau, the township has a total area of 24.1 square miles (62.3 km^{2}), of which 24.0 square miles (62.1 km^{2}) is land and 0.12 square miles (0.3 km^{2}), or 0.41%, is water. It contains the census-designated place of Table Rock.

== Recreation ==
A small portion of Pennsylvania State Game Lands Number 249 is located in Butler Township.

== Demographics ==
Historical population
Census	Pop.	Note	%±
2000	2,678		—
2010	2,567		−4.1%
2020	2,552		−0.6%
2023 (est.)	2,597		1.8%

As of the census of 2000, there were 2,678 people, 979 households, and 784 families residing in the township. The population density was 111.5 inhabitants per square mile (43.1/km^{2}). There were 1,024 housing units at an average density of 42.6 per square mile (16.4/km^{2}). The racial makeup of the township was 95.59% White, 0.60% African American, 0.37% Native American, 0.11% Asian, 2.65% from other races, and 0.67% from two or more races. Hispanic or Latino of any race were 5.08% of the population.

There were 979 households, out of which 32.9% had children under the age of 18 living with them, 68.7% were married couples living together, 7.5% had a female householder with no husband present, and 19.9% were non-families. 15.0% of all households were made up of individuals, and 6.5% had someone living alone who was 65 years of age or older. The average household size was 2.74 and the average family size was 3.01.

In the township the population was spread out, with 24.8% under the age of 18, 7.5% from 18 to 24, 28.9% from 25 to 44, 26.3% from 45 to 64, and 12.5% who were 65 years of age or older. The median age was 39 years. For every 100 females, there were 96.5 males. For every 100 females age 18 and over, there were 96.3 males.

The median income for a household in the township was $43,640, and the median income for a family was $48,527. Males had a median income of $32,014 versus $22,891 for females. The per capita income for the township was $17,623. About 5.7% of families and 7.5% of the population were below the poverty line, including 9.9% of those under age 18 and 10.1% of those age 65 or over.
