= Idaville, Pennsylvania =

Unincorporated community in Pennsylvania, US

- Census-designated place
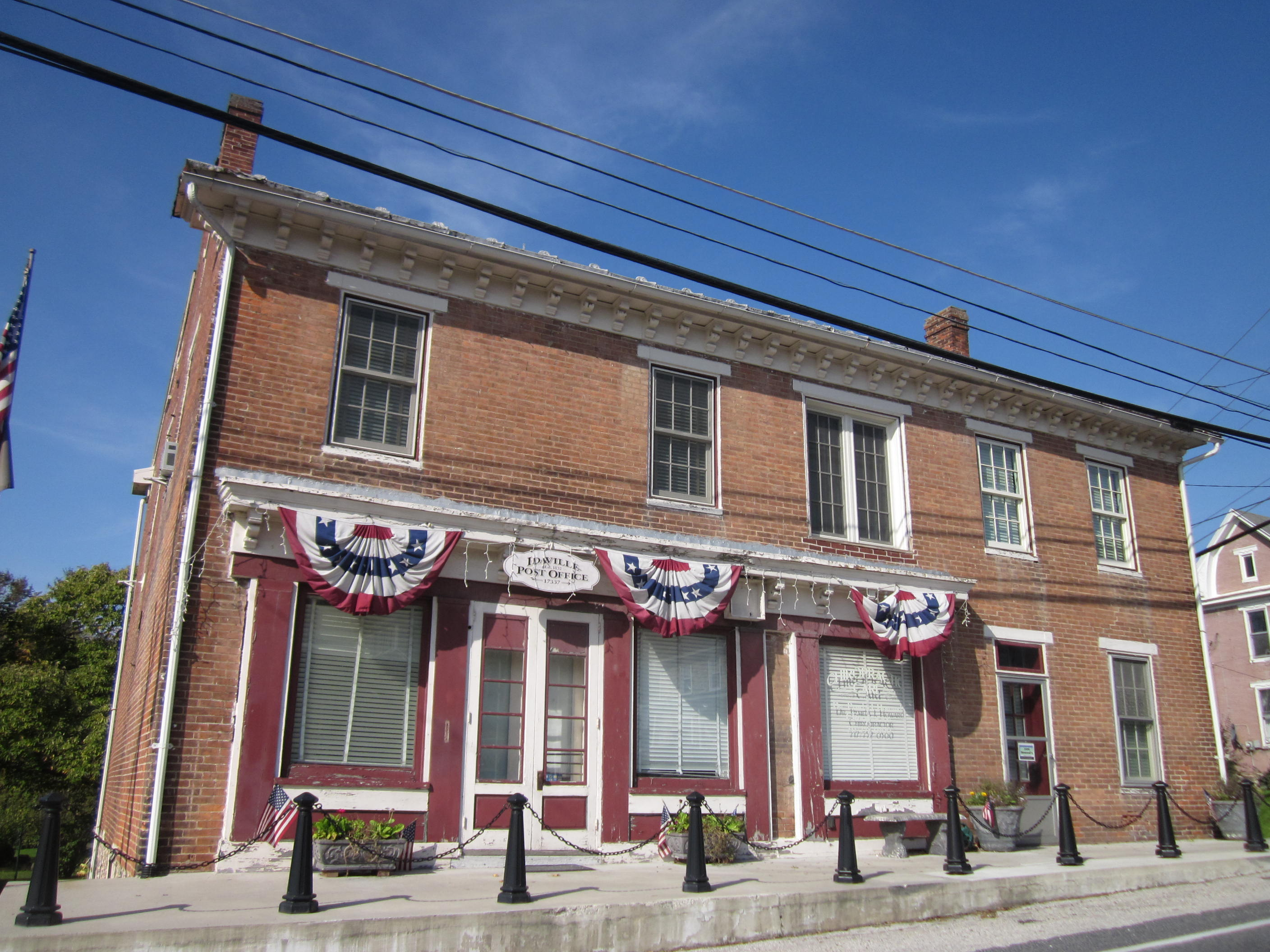
- Idaville, Pennsylvania

- Location in Adams County and the state of Pennsylvania.
- Coordinates: 40°00′53″N 77°12′10″W
- Country: United States
- State: Pennsylvania
- County: Adams
- Township: Huntington

Area
  - Total: 0.70 sq mi (1.81 km^{2})
  - Land: 0.69 sq mi (1.80 km^{2})
  - Water: 0.0039 sq mi (0.01 km^{2})
- Elevation: 804 ft (245 m)

Population (2020)
  - Total: 176
  - Density: 253.2/sq mi (97.78/km^{2})
- Time zone: UTC-5 (Eastern (EST))
  - Summer (DST): UTC-4 (EDT)
- ZIP code: 17337
- Area code: 717
- GNIS feature ID: 1177683
- FIPS code: 42-36712

Idaville is a census-designated place that is located in Huntington Township, Adams County, Pennsylvania, United States. As of the 2020 census, its population was 176. Idaville is served by the Bermudian Springs School District.

== Geography ==
Idaville is located on Pennsylvania Route 34, 7 miles (11 km) south of Mount Holly Springs. The town (which starts at the Adams-Cumberland County line) and stretches for 1 mile (1.6 km) along Route 34 and is separated from Tyrone Township, adjacent to the south end of the town, by Bermudian Creek.

Idaville is located at 40°00′53″N 77°12′10″W at an elevation of 804 feet (245 m) above sea level.

== Demographics ==
Historical population
Census	Pop.	Note	%±
2010	177		—
2020	176		−0.6%
U.S. Decennial Census

== Education ==
It is in the Bermudian Springs School District.
