= Reading Township, Pennsylvania =

Township in Pennsylvania, US

Coordinates: 39°57′06″N 77°02′14″W

Reading Township, Adams County, Pennsylvania
- Township
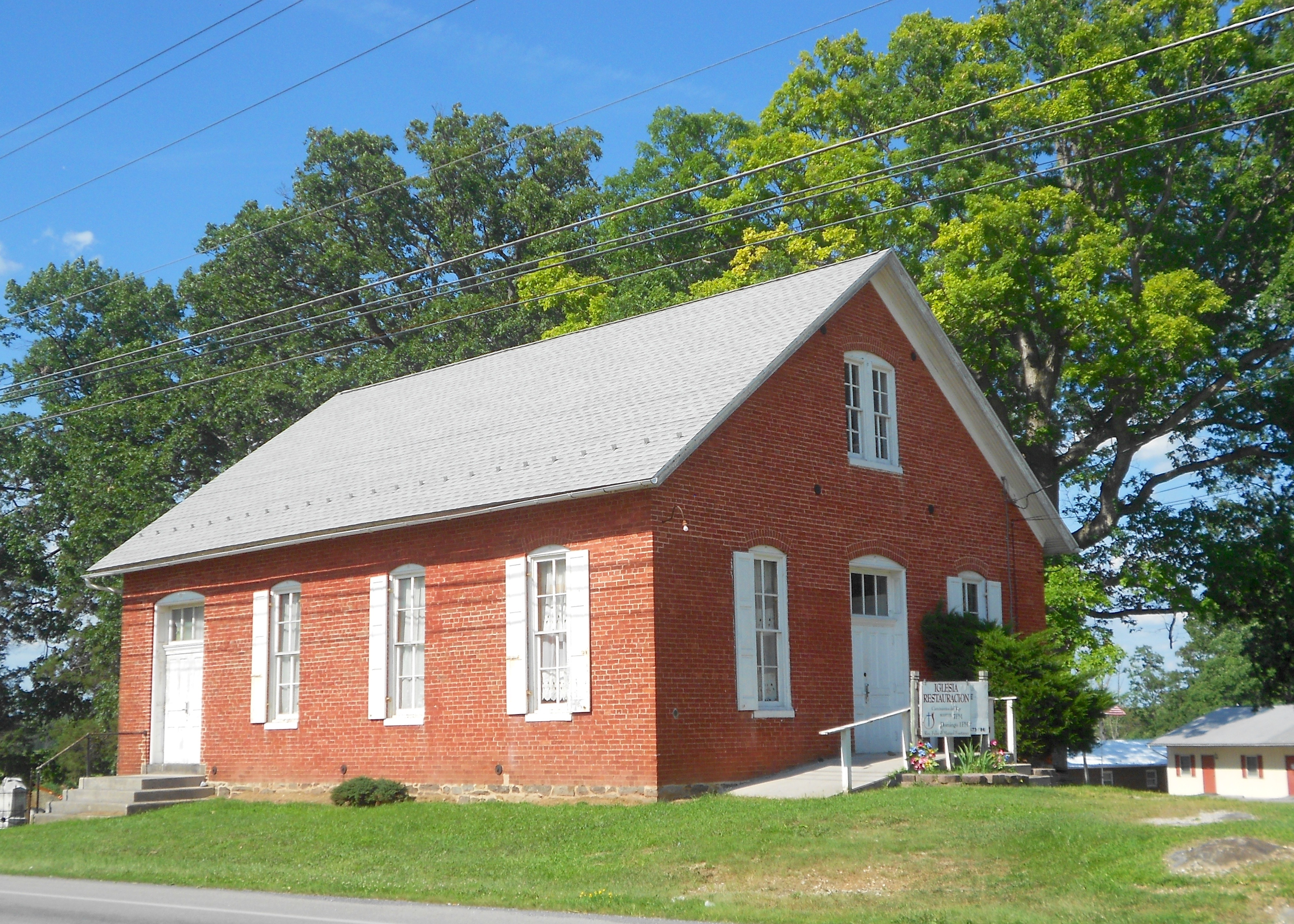
- Church near the township offices

- Seal

- Location in Adams County and the state of Pennsylvania.
- Country: United States
- State: Pennsylvania
- County: Adams
- Settled: 1749
- Incorporated: Before 1800

Government
  - Type: Board of Supervisors
  - Chairperson: Kevin Holtzinger
  - Vice-Chairperson: Greg Heefner
  - Supervisor: Jason Phillips

Area
  - Total: 26.74 sq mi (69.26 km^{2})
  - Land: 26.31 sq mi (68.15 km^{2})
  - Water: 0.43 sq mi (1.11 km^{2})

Population (2010)
  - Total: 5,780
  - Estimate (2016): 5,832
  - Density: 221.6/sq mi (85.57/km^{2})
- Time zone: UTC-5 (Eastern (EST))
  - Summer (DST): UTC-4 (EDT)
- Area code: 717
- FIPS code: 42-001-63616
- Website: Official website

Reading Township (/ˈrɛdɪŋ/ RED-ing) is a township in Adams County, Pennsylvania, United States. The population was 5,780 at the 2010 census.

== Geography ==
The township is located in eastern Adams County and contains the settlements of Hampton and part of Lake Meade. According to the United States Census Bureau, the township has a total area of 26.8 square miles (69.3 km^{2}), of which 26.3 square miles (68.2 km^{2}) is land and 0.42 square miles (1.1 km^{2}), or 1.60%, is water. There are approximately 72 miles of paved roadway within the Township.

== Recreation ==
A small portion of Pennsylvania State Game Lands Number 249 is located in Reading Township.

== Demographics ==
Historical population
Census	Pop.	Note	%±
2000	5,106		—
2010	5,780		13.2%
2016 (est.)	5,832		0.9%
U.S. Decennial Census

As of the census of 2000, there were 5,106 people, 1,803 households, and 1,456 families residing in the township. The population density was 192.3 people per square mile (74.2 people/km^{2}). There were 1,982 housing units at an average density of 74.6 per square mile (28.8/km^{2}). The racial makeup of the township was 98.26% White, 0.18% African American, 0.24% Native American, 0.18% Asian, 0.02% Pacific Islander, 0.27% from other races, and 0.86% from two or more races. Hispanic or Latino of any race were 1.19% of the population.

There were 1,803 households, out of which 41.6% had children under the age of 18 living with them, 67.8% were married couples living together, 8.9% had a female householder with no husband present, and 19.2% were non-families. 14.6% of all households were made up of individuals, and 5.2% had someone living alone who was 65 years of age or older. The average household size was 2.83 and the average family size was 3.13.

In the township the population was spread out, with 29.7% under the age of 18, 6.7% from 18 to 24, 34.8% from 25 to 44, 20.2% from 45 to 64, and 8.6% who were 65 years of age or older. The median age was 34 years. For every 100 females, there were 100.5 males. For every 100 females age 18 and over, there were 96.7 males.

The median income for a household in the township was $47,571, and the median income for a family was $50,435. Males had a median income of $36,913 versus $25,287 for females. The per capita income for the township was $18,305. About 6.9% of families and 8.6% of the population were below the poverty line, including 15.7% of those under age 18 and 5.5% of those age 65 or over.
