= Pennsylvania Route 194 =

State highway in Pennsylvania, US

Pennsylvania Route 194

Route information
- Maintained by PennDOT and Borough of Hanover
- Length: 31.974 mi (51.457 km)

Major junctions
- South end: MD 194 near Kingsdale
- PA 97 in Littlestown; PA 116 in Hanover; PA 94 in Hanover; US 30 in Abbottstown; PA 234 in East Berlin
- North end: PA 74 near Dillsburg

Location
- Country: United States
- State: Pennsylvania
- Counties: Adams, York

Highway system
- Pennsylvania State Route System; Interstate; US; State; Scenic; Legislative
← PA 193	→ PA 196

Pennsylvania Route 194 (PA 194) is a 31-mile-long (50 km) north–south state highway located in south-central Pennsylvania. The southern end is at the Maryland state line, where it continues south as Maryland Route 194 (MD 194), and the northern terminus is at the intersection with PA 74 near the borough of Dillsburg. PA 194 heads northeast from the state line through rural areas in southeastern Adams County, intersecting PA 97 in Littlestown. The route continues into the southwestern section of York County and passes through Hanover, where it forms a concurrency with PA 116 and crosses PA 94 in the downtown area. Past here, PA 194 heads north and crosses back into the eastern portion of Adams County, passing through rural land and intersecting U.S. Route 30 (US 30) in Abbottstown and PA 234 in East Berlin. The route heads into the northwestern portion of York County and passes through Franklintown before coming to its northern terminus.

The section of PA 194 south of Hanover was part of the 18th-century Monocacy Road which connected Hanover to Frederick, Maryland. In the 19th century, the road between Littlestown and Hanover was the Hanover and Littlestown Turnpike while the road between Hanover and East Berlin was the Hanover and East Berlin Turnpike, both private turnpikes. In 1928, PA 194 was designated between US 140 (now PA 97) in Littlestown and PA 74 in Dillsburg along a paved road. Two years later, the route was extended from Littlestown to the Maryland border. The road was widened in the Hanover area in the 1940s and split into a one-way pair in downtown Hanover along with PA 116 by 1965. In 2002, a roundabout was constructed at the intersection with US 30 in Abbottstown.

== Route description ==
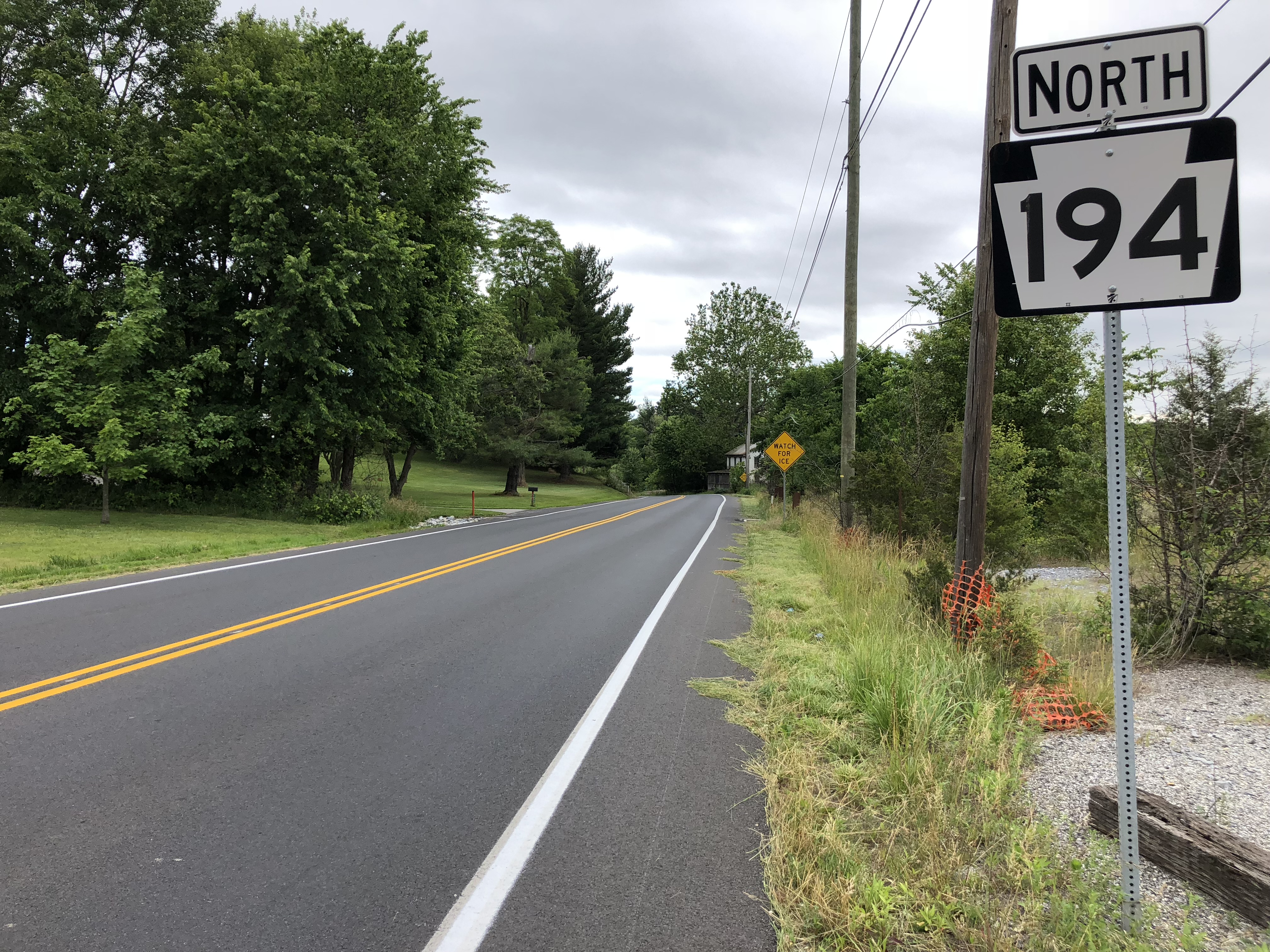
PA 194 northbound past its southern terminus at MD 194 at the Maryland border in Germany Township

PA 194 begins at the Maryland border in Germany Township, Adams County, where the road continues south into Maryland as MD 194. From the state line, the route heads northeast on two-lane undivided Frederick Pike, passing through agricultural areas with a few residences and patches of woods. PA 194 turns northeast and enters the borough of Littlestown, running past a few businesses and heading into residential areas as King Street. The road heads east-northeast into the commercial downtown and intersects PA 97. Past this area, the route passes more homes and leaves Littlestown for Union Township, becoming Hanover Pike. PA 194 continues into farmland with some woods and residences, turning northeast again. The road passes through Lefevre and crosses the South Branch of the Conewago Creek into Conewago Township. The route runs through more agricultural surroundings and passes through Mount Pleasant.

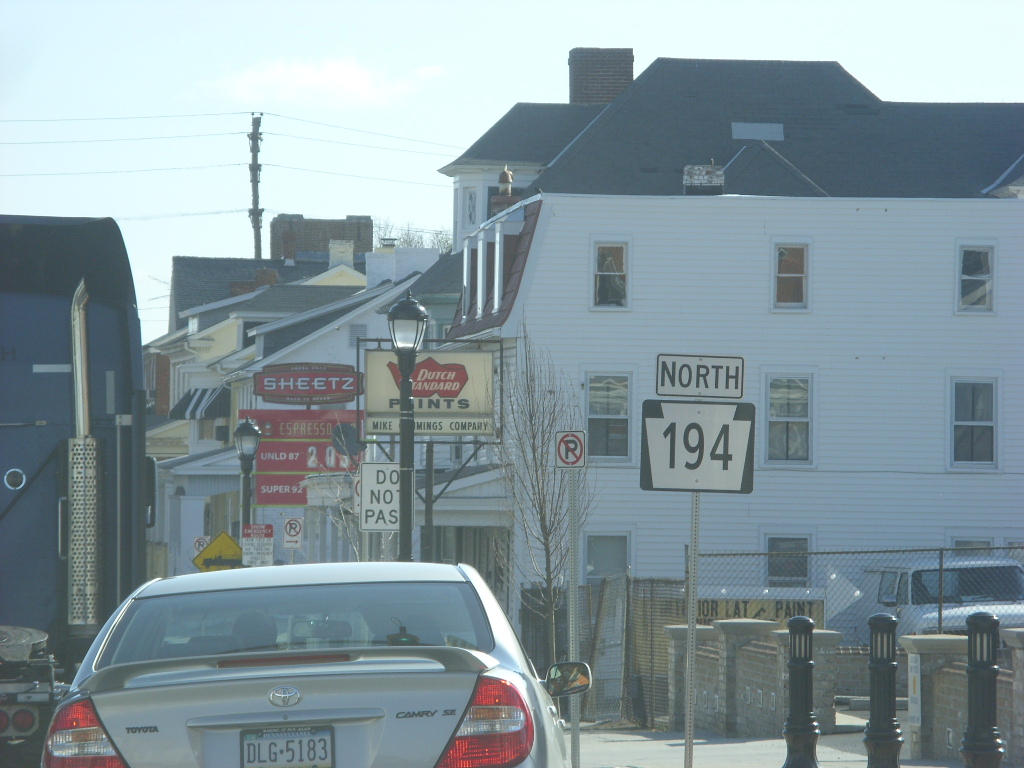
PA 194 northbound in Littlestown

PA 194 enters Penn Township in York County and becomes Frederick Street as it becomes lined with homes, continuing into the borough of Hanover. Upon reaching the Forney Avenue intersection, the route splits into a one-way pair with northbound PA 194 continuing along two-way Frederick Street and southbound PA 194 using Forney Avenue to one-way Chestnut Street. Both streets pass a mix of homes and businesses, continuing into the downtown area of Hanover. In this area, the route meets PA 116 and forms a concurrency with that route. In the commercial center, the one-way pair crosses PA 94, with northbound PA 116/PA 194 becoming Broadway at this point. A short distance later, PA 116 splits from PA 194 by turning east onto York Street, with northbound PA 194 continuing north as a one-way street. The one-way pair passes rowhouses, eventually merging with the route continuing north on two-way Broadway. The road crosses CSX's Hanover Subdivision and a York Railway line at-grade as it continues past a mix of residential and commercial buildings before becoming lined with homes. After intersecting Moulstown Road, PA 194 crosses back into Penn Township and becomes Abbottstown Pike as it enters agricultural areas with scattered development.

As the route enters more forested areas with some homes, it crosses into Berwick Township in Adams County and heads north through farmland and housing developments. PA 194 continues through a mix of hilly farms, woods, and homes before reaching the borough of Abbottstown. Here, the road becomes Queen Street and passes homes, intersecting US 30 in the center of town at Abbottstown Square, a traffic circle. After leaving Abbottstown, the route enters farmland, briefly passing through Berwick Township again as an unnamed road before continuing into Hamilton Township. The road runs through agricultural areas with scattered residential developments. Upon entering the borough of East Berlin, PA 194 becomes Abbottstown Street and passes homes. Upon crossing PA 234 in the center of town, the route becomes Harrisburg Street and crosses the Conewago Creek, heading through a small portion of Reading Township.

PA 194 enters Washington Township in York County and continues north through more farmland with some homes and woods as Baltimore Pike. The road turns northwest and enters a mix of agricultural areas and woodland. After crossing the Bermudian Creek, the route heads north again into more areas of farms along with a few patches of trees and homes. PA 194 eventually crosses into Franklin Township before continuing into the borough of Franklintown, where the road is lined with homes and is known as Baltimore Road. Upon leaving Franklintown, the route briefly enters Franklin Township again before crossing into Carroll Township and becoming Baltimore Street as it passes through more rural areas. PA 194 reaches its northern terminus at an intersection with PA 74 to the south of the borough of Dillsburg.

== History ==
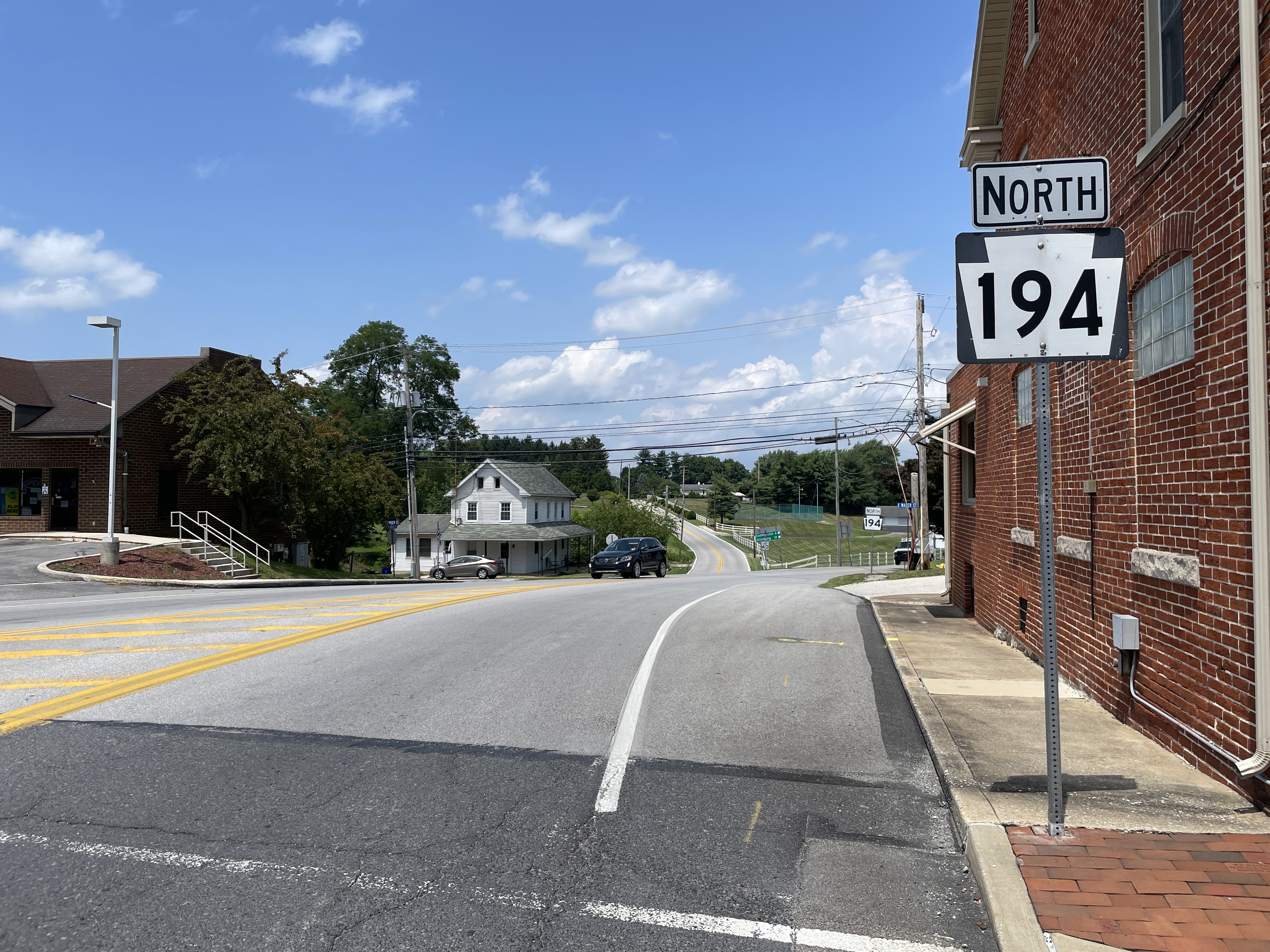
PA 194 northbound past US 30 in Abbottstown

The portion of current PA 194 southwest of Hanover dates back to the 18th century as a section of the Monocacy Road connecting Hanover to Frederick, Maryland. The section of the road between Littlestown and Hanover was a private turnpike called the Hanover and Littlestown Turnpike while the portion between Hanover and East Berlin was the Hanover and East Berlin Turnpike, both dating to the 19th century. When Pennsylvania first legislated routes in 1911, present-day PA 194 was designated as part of Legislative Route 230 between Littlestown and Hanover and as part of Legislative Route 190 between Hanover and Abbottstown. PA 194 was designated in 1928 to run from US 140 (now PA 97) in Littlestown north to PA 74 south of Dillsburg, following its current alignment between the two points. At this time, the entire length of the route was paved. The road between the Maryland border and Littlestown was an unnumbered, paved road. By 1930, PA 194 was extended southwest from Littlestown to the Maryland border. In the 1940s, the route was widened between the border of York and Adams counties and the northern border of Hanover. By 1965, PA 116 and PA 194 were split into a one-way pair through downtown Hanover. In May 2002, a roundabout was proposed at the intersection with US 30 in Abbottstown in order to improve safety and reduce congestion along PA 194 for traffic having to stop at the intersection. The intersection at US 30 in the center of Abbottstown was converted to a roundabout in December 2002.

== Major intersections ==
County	Location	mi	km	Destinations	Notes
Adams	Germany Township	0.000	0.000	MD 194 south (Francis Scott Key Highway) – Frederick	Maryland state line; southern terminus
Adams	Littlestown	2.742	4.413	PA 97 (Queen Street) – Gettysburg, Baltimore	
York	Hanover	9.777	15.735	PA 116 west (High Street) – Gettysburg	South end of PA 116 concurrency
York	Hanover	9.927	15.976	PA 94 (Carlisle Street/Baltimore Street)	
York	Hanover	9.984	16.068	PA 116 east (York Street)	North end of PA 116 concurrency
Adams	Abbottstown	16.146	25.984	US 30 (King Street) – Gettysburg, York	Traffic circle
Adams	East Berlin	19.882	31.997	PA 234 (King Street)	
York	Carroll Township	31.974	51.457	PA 74 (Carlisle Road)	Northern terminus
1.000 mi = 1.609 km; 1.000 km = 0.621 mi: Concurrency terminus
