= Pennsylvania Route 94 =

State highway in Pennsylvania, US

Pennsylvania Route 94
- 94th Infantry Division Memorial Highway

Route information
- Maintained by PennDOT
- Length: 30.738 mi (49.468 km)

Major junctions
- South end: MD 30 in West Manheim Township
- PA 116 / PA 194 in Hanover; US 30 in Hamilton Township; PA 394 in Hampton; PA 234 near Hampton; US 15 in York Springs
- North end: PA 34 near Mount Holly Springs

Location
- Country: United States
- State: Pennsylvania
- Counties: York, Adams, Cumberland

Highway system
- Pennsylvania State Route System; Interstate; US; State; Scenic; Legislative
← PA 93	→ I-95

Pennsylvania Route 94 (PA 94) is a 30-mile (48 km) long north–south state highway located in southern Pennsylvania. The southern terminus of the route is at the Mason–Dixon line, where the road continues into Maryland as Maryland Route 30 (MD 30). The northern terminus is at PA 34 south of Mount Holly Springs. PA 94 heads north-northwest from the state line through southwestern York County, where it passes through Hanover and intersects PA 116/PA 194 in the center of town. Past Hanover, the route heads into rural areas and crosses into the eastern portion of Adams County. Here, PA 94 intersects U.S. Route 30 (US 30) east of New Oxford, PA 394 in Hampton, PA 234 north of Hampton, and US 15 in York Springs. The route heads into Cumberland County and crosses South Mountain, reaching its end at PA 34. PA 94 is designated as the 94th Infantry Division Memorial Highway for its entire length.

The current route served as part of two 19th-century turnpikes that connected the Cumberland Valley with Baltimore. The section south of Hanover became part of the Hanover branch of the Baltimore and Reisterstown Turnpike (later the Baltimore and Hanover Turnpike) in 1805 while the section north of Hanover became the southern portion of the Hanover and Carlisle Turnpike, which continued north to Carlisle, in 1812. PA 94 was designated in 1928 to run from MD 30 at the Maryland border southeast of Hanover to PA 34 in Mount Holly Springs along a paved road. The route was widened in Hanover in the 1940s and 1950s.

== Route description ==
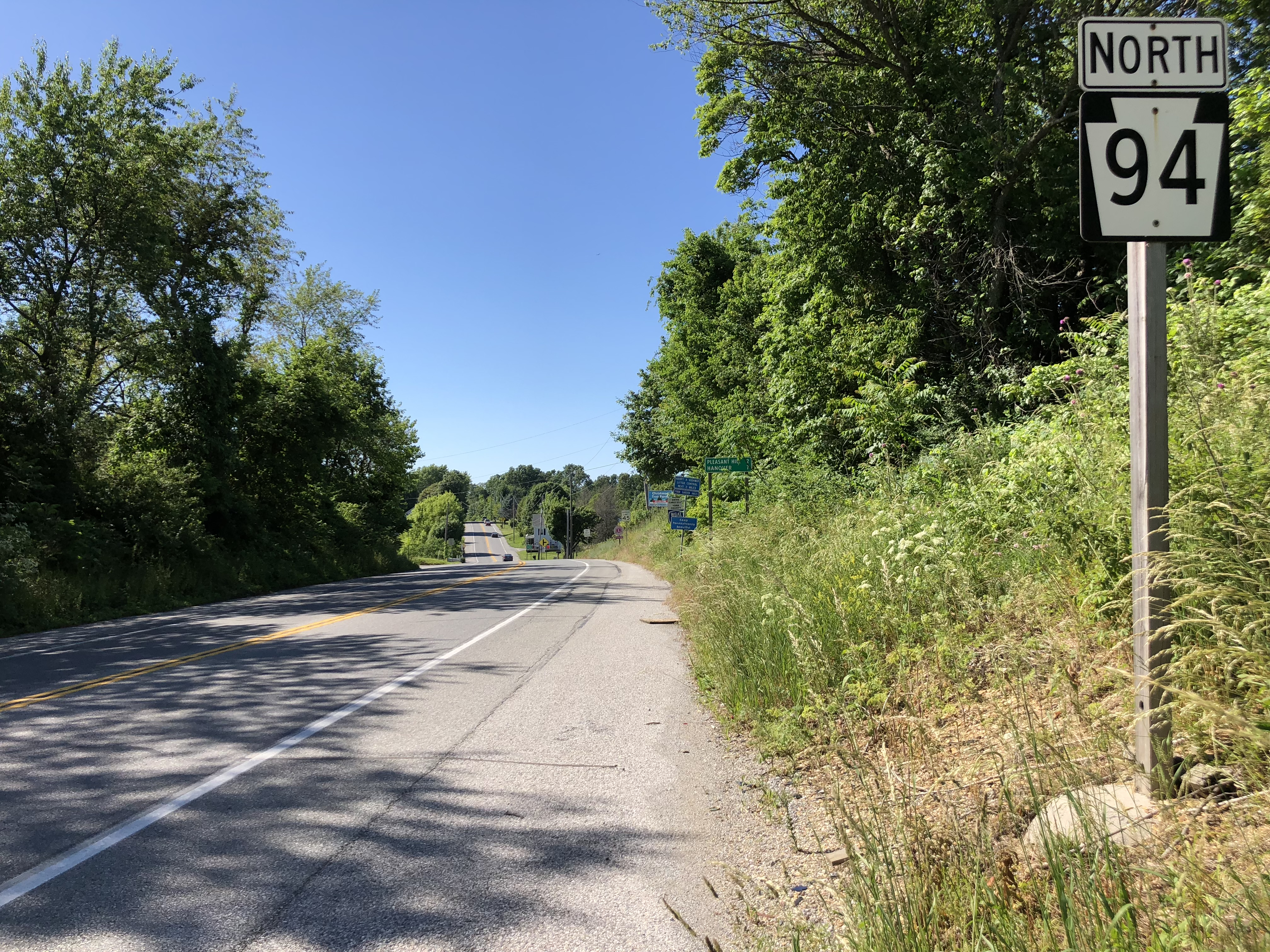
PA 94 northbound past its southern terminus at MD 30 at the Maryland border in West Manheim Township

PA 94 begins at the Maryland border in West Manheim Township, York County, where the road continues south into that state as MD 30. From the state line, the route heads northwest on two-lane undivided Baltimore Pike, passing through agricultural areas with some woods and residential development and serving the communities of West Manheim and Pleasant Hill. PA 94 runs through more rural areas with residential subdivisions. The road briefly gains a center left-turn lane as it passes commercial development, turning north and heading into Penn Township. At this point, the route becomes Baltimore Street and passing a mix of residential and business development, running through Parkville and curving northwest again. The road enters the borough of Hanover, where it is lined with several homes. Upon reaching the commercial downtown, PA 94 comes to an intersection with PA 116 and northbound PA 194. The route becomes Carlisle Street at this point and intersects the southbound direction of PA 194 a block later. The road crosses a York Railway line and CSX's Hanover Subdivision railroad line within a short distance of each other and leaves the downtown area, heading past more residences. Farther north, PA 94 gains a center left-turn lane and passes several businesses. The route becomes the border between Penn Township to the west and Hanover to the east as it runs to the west of the North Hanover Mall. The road passes more businesses before fully entering Penn Township again and narrowing back to two lanes.

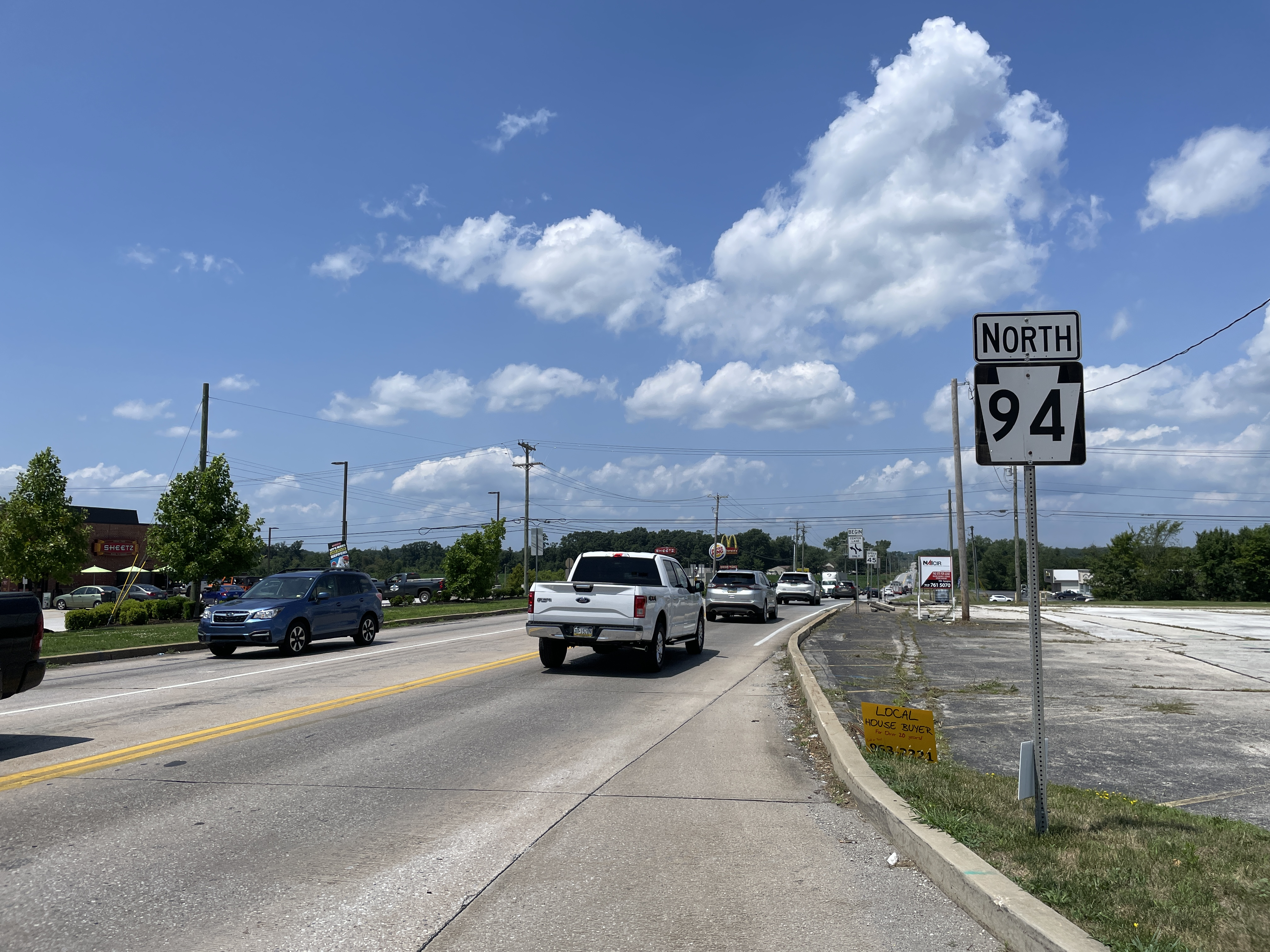
PA 94 northbound past US 30 in Cross Keys

PA 94 enters Conewago Township in Adams County and becomes Carlisle Pike, heading into agricultural areas with some commercial development. A short distance later, the route becomes the border between Oxford Township to the west and Berwick Township to the east, running through a wooded area between two lakes before heading through more farmland with some woods and development. In the commercial community of Cross Keys, the road crosses US 30 into Hamilton Township to the east of the borough of New Oxford, running through more agricultural areas with some homes. Farther north, PA 94 crosses the Conewago Creek into Reading Township and runs through more rural areas before coming into the residential community of Hampton and intersecting the eastern terminus of PA 394 at a roundabout. The road heads through a mix of farms, woods, and homes as it comes to a junction with PA 234. Past this, the route continues through open farmland with some woodland and residences, passing through Round Hill. PA 94 crosses Mud Run into Huntington Township and runs through more rural areas as it passes to the west of Bermudian Springs High School, turning more to the northwest as it heads into Latimore Township. The route heads through forested areas with some homes, crossing back into Huntington Township and reaching an interchange with US 15, becoming a four-lane divided highway at this point. From here, the road continues into residential areas as a two-lane undivided road and enters the borough of York Springs at the State Street intersection, passing through the town on Main Street. PA 94 crosses back into Huntington Township and becomes Carlisle Pike again, running through farmland with a few areas of woods and homes. The route heads into Latimore Township again and turns more to the north through open farm fields.

PA 94 heads north into South Middleton Township in Cumberland County and becomes Baltimore Pike, running through a mix of farms and woods with some homes. Farther north, the road traverses forested South Mountain and crosses the Appalachian Trail, curving to the northwest. PA 94 turns north and enters the borough of Mount Holly Springs and becomes South Baltimore Avenue, passing through wooded areas of housing developments before ending at PA 34.

== History ==
The section of present-day PA 94 south of Hanover was built in 1736 and 1737 as a wagon road connecting the Conewago Settlement (present-day Hanover) with Baltimore. This road became the Hanover branch of the Baltimore and Reisterstown Turnpike in 1805, a private turnpike that ran between Baltimore and Hanover via Reisterstown, Maryland. This branch later became known as the Baltimore and Hanover Turnpike, with toll collection stopped by 1899. The section of current PA 94 north of Hanover was chartered as the Hanover and Carlisle Turnpike in 1812, connecting Hanover with Carlisle. These two turnpikes provided an improved trade link between the Cumberland Valley and Baltimore. When routes were legislated in Pennsylvania in 1911, what is now PA 94 was designated as part of Legislative Route 190 between the Maryland border and Hanover. PA 94 was designated in 1928 to run from MD 30 at the Maryland border southeast of Hanover north-northwest to PA 34 in Mount Holly Springs, following its current alignment. Upon designation, the entire length of the route was paved. The portion of PA 94 in central Hanover was widened in the 1940s. In the 1950s, the widened sections of the route were extended further north and south in the Hanover area. In 1998, an act of the Pennsylvania General Assembly designated the entire length of PA 94 as the 94th Infantry Division Memorial Highway in honor of the 94th Infantry Division. In 2020, a roundabout was constructed at the intersection with PA 394 in Hampton.

== Major intersections ==
County	Location	mi	km	Destinations	Notes
York	West Manheim Township	0.000	0.000	MD 30 south (Hanover Pike) – Baltimore	Maryland state line; southern terminus
York	Hanover	6.916	11.130	PA 116 east / PA 194 north (Frederick Street/Broadway)	One-way pair
York	Hanover	7.018	11.294	PA 116 west / PA 194 south (Chestnut Street) – Littlestown, Gettysburg	One-way pair
Adams	Oxford–Hamilton– Berwick township tripoint	12.343	19.864	US 30 (Lincoln Highway) – New Oxford, Gettysburg, York	
Adams	Reading Township	16.699	26.874	PA 394 west (Hunterstown Hampton Road)	Roundabout; eastern terminus of PA 394
Adams	Reading Township	17.421	28.036	PA 234 (East Berlin Road) – Biglerville, East Berlin	
Adams	Huntington Township	22.370	36.001	US 15 – Gettysburg, Harrisburg	Interchange
Cumberland	Mount Holly Springs	30.738	49.468	PA 34 (Yates Street/Baltimore Avenue) – Carlisle, Biglerville	Northern terminus
1.000 mi = 1.609 km; 1.000 km = 0.621 mi
