= Pennsylvania Route 116 =

State highway in Pennsylvania, US

Pennsylvania Route 116

Route information
- Maintained by PennDOT and Borough of Hanover
- Length: 39.799 mi (64.050 km)

Major junctions
- West end: PA 16 in Carroll Valley
- US 15 Bus. in Gettysburg; US 30 in Gettysburg; US 15 in Straban Township; PA 194 in Hanover; PA 94 in Hanover; PA 216 near Hanover; PA 516 near Spring Grove
- East end: US 30 in West Manchester Township

Location
- Country: United States
- State: Pennsylvania
- Counties: Adams, York

Highway system
- Pennsylvania State Route System; Interstate; US; State; Scenic; Legislative
← PA 115	→ PA 117

Pennsylvania Route 116 (PA 116) is an east–west route located Adams and York counties in southern Pennsylvania. The route begins at PA 16 in Carroll Valley in Adams County, heading northeast through rural areas and passing through Fairfield. PA 116 passes through the historic Civil War town of Gettysburg, where the Battle of Gettysburg was held. In Gettysburg, the route intersects U.S. Route 15 Business (US 15 Bus.) and US 30 in the town center. From Gettysburg, PA 116 heads southeast and comes to an interchange with the US 15 freeway in Straban Township as it heads into farmland and curves east. The route passes through Bonneauville and McSherrystown before it crosses into York County and heads into Hanover. Here, the route forms a concurrency with PA 194 and crosses PA 94 in the downtown area. PA 116 intersects PA 216 before it leaves Hanover and heads northeast through rural land. The route has an intersection with PA 516 near Spring Grove before it ends at US 30 in West Manchester Township, west of York.

The section of the road in Adams County dates back to the 19th century, with Fairfield Road to the west of Gettysburg used by the Confederate States Army during the Retreat from Gettysburg. PA 116 was designated onto its current alignment between PA 16 in Carroll Valley and US 30 in West Manchester Township in 1928 as a paved road. In the 1930s and 1950s, the highway was widened in the Hanover area. The route was moved to a one-way pair in downtown Hanover along with PA 194 by 1965.

== Route description ==
=== Adams County ===
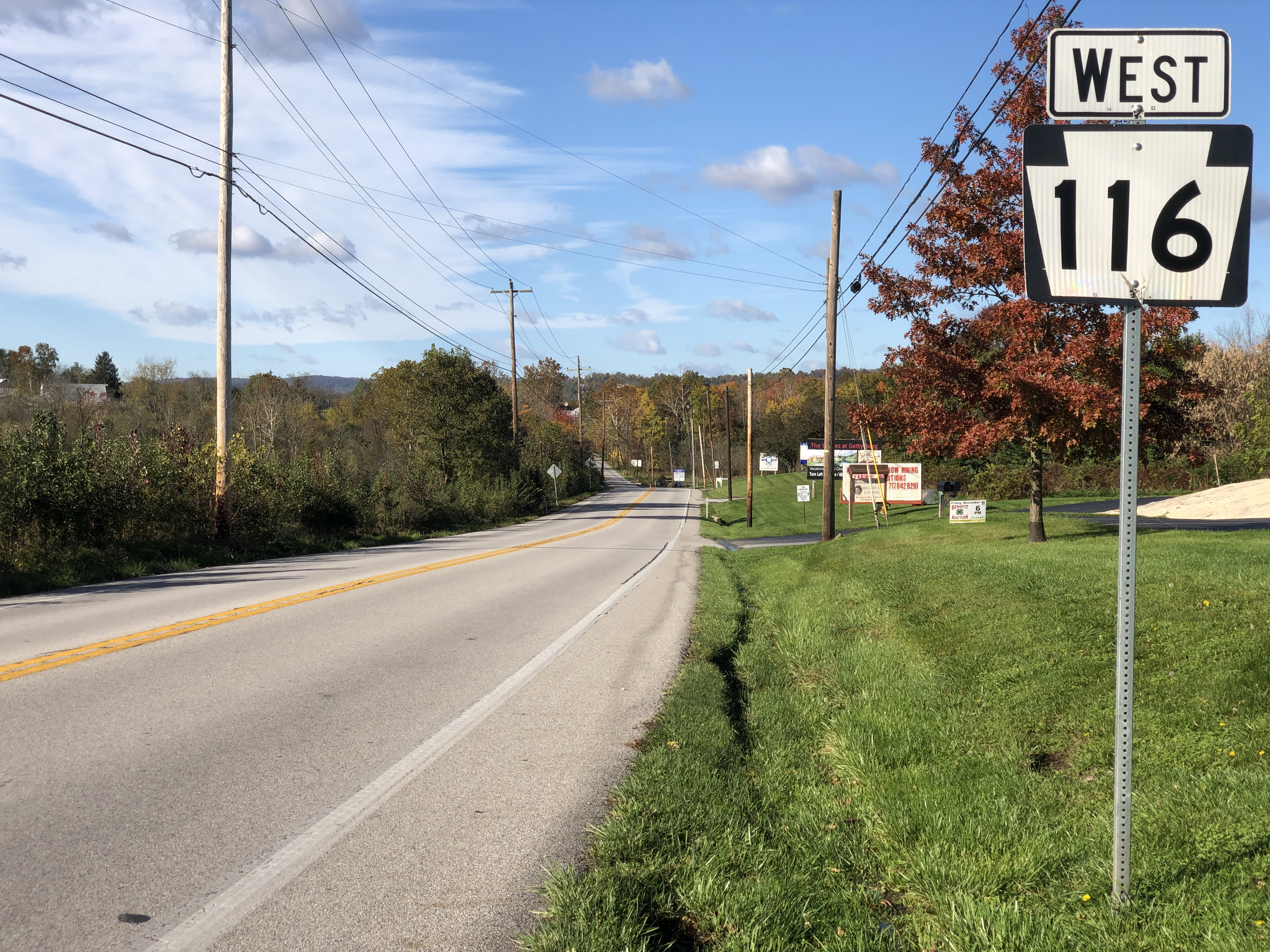
PA 116 westbound in Highland Township

PA 116 begins at an intersection with PA 16 in the borough of Carroll Valley in Adams County, heading north on two-lane undivided Fairfield Road. The road heads through forested areas with some housing developments to the west and the Liberty Mountain Resort to the east. The route runs through a mix of fields and residential subdivisions before heading into Hamiltonban Township and turning northeast through rural areas with some commercial development. PA 116 continues into the borough of Fairfield and passes homes along Main Street. The route heads back into Hamiltonban Township and becomes Fairfield Road again, continuing through agricultural areas with some woods and homes. The road enters Highland Township and passes through more rural areas, curving more to the east. PA 116 crosses the Marsh Creek into Cumberland Township, running through more farmland before rural residential and business development. The road runs near portions of Gettysburg National Military Park prior to entering the borough of Gettysburg and becoming West Middle Street. The route heads into residential areas and turns east, reaching the commercial downtown. Upon coming to the intersection with US 15 Bus. adjacent to the Adams County Courthouse, PA 116 turns north to form a concurrency with that route for a block on Baltimore Street. At the Lincoln Square traffic circle, PA 116 splits from US 15 Bus. and turns east to join US 30 on York Street, passing more downtown businesses. US 30 splits to the northeast and PA 116 continues east on Hanover Street, heading into residential areas.

The route crosses the Rock Creek into Straban Township and becomes Hanover Road, running near a portion of Gettysburg National Military Park as it heads into areas of woods and farms with a few homes. The road comes to a diamond interchange with the US 15 freeway and continues through more agricultural areas with some residences as it continues into Mount Pleasant Township. Farther east, PA 116 enters the borough of Bonneauville and passes homes along with a few businesses. The route heads back into Mount Pleasant Township and passes through more farmland with occasional development, running through Square Corner. The road runs through a portion of Union Township and briefly becomes the border between Mount Pleasant Township to the north and Union Township to the south before crossing the South Branch Conewago Creek into Conewago Township. PA 116 runs through Brushtown and heads through a mix of farmland and residential development prior to curving northeast into the borough of McSherrystown. Here, the road becomes Main Street and is lined with several homes. PA 116 turns southeast onto 3rd Street, becoming the border between McSherrystown to the west and Conewago Township to the east. The route curves east fully into Conewago Township, passing several residences in the community of Midway.

=== York County ===
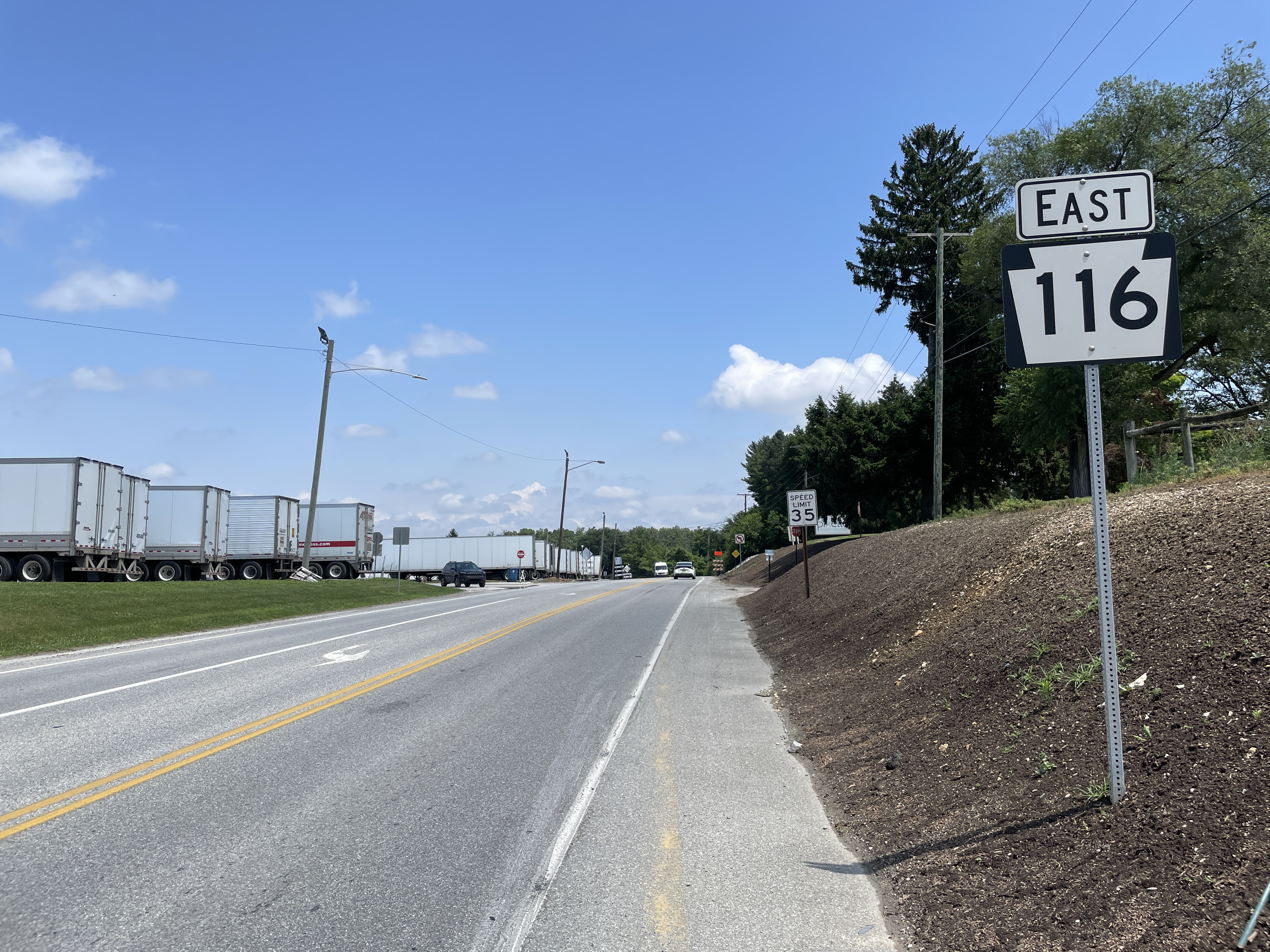
PA 116 eastbound in North Codorus Township

PA 116 crosses into the borough of Hanover in York County and continues through residential areas. The route splits from 3rd Street by heading southeast on High Street, passing homes and businesses. The road crosses a York Railway line before reaching an intersection with PA 194. At this point, PA 116 forms a concurrency with PA 194 by turning northeast onto a one-way pair that follows two-way Frederick Street eastbound and one-way Chestnut Street westbound. In the commercial center, the one-way pair crosses PA 94, with northbound PA 116/PA 194 becoming Broadway at this point. A short distance later, PA 116 splits from PA 194 by turning east onto two-way York Street and passes more homes, crossing into Penn Township. The route comes to an intersection with PA 216 and turns northeast into a mix of farmland and industry. The road crosses CSX's Hanover Subdivision railroad line in York Road, at which point it enters Heidelberg Township and becomes Hanover Road. PA 116 runs through agricultural areas with some development and woods, passing through Ambau. The route crosses the West Branch Codorus Creek into North Codorus Township and becomes York Road, passing through more rural areas with residential development, crossing another York Railway line.

The road intersects the northern terminus of PA 516 and turns north, crossing the West Branch Codorus Creek into the borough of Spring Grove. Here, PA 116 becomes Main Street and runs through an industrial area, crossing a York Railway line. Farther north, the route heads into residential and commercial areas, crossing another York Railway line. After a roundabout at Hanover Street and Roths Church Road, the road forms the border between Spring Grove to the west and Jackson Township to the east, passing more development. PA 116 fully enters Jackson Township, where the name becomes Hanover Road, and crosses the York Railway again, continuing northeast through agricultural areas with a few housing developments as it passes through Nashville. The route continues into West Manchester Township and reaches its eastern terminus at an intersection with US 30.

== History ==
Fairfield Road and Hanover Road date back to the 19th century as unpaved roads leading out of Gettysburg. Fairfield Road was used in the Retreat from Gettysburg by the Confederate States Army following their loss in the Battle of Gettysburg in July 1863. When Pennsylvania legislated routes in 1911, what is now PA 116 was designated as part of Legislative Route 44 between Carroll Valley and Gettysburg, Legislative Route 231 between Gettysburg and Hanover, and Legislative Route 230 between Hanover and West Manchester Township. By 1926, the road between Gettysburg and Hanover was paved. PA 116 was designated in 1928 to run from PA 16 in Carroll Valley east through Gettysburg and Hanover to US 30 west of York, following its current alignment. At this time, the entire length of the route was paved. In the 1930s, the route was widened through Hanover. PA 116 was widened between McSherrystown and Hanover in the 1950s. By 1965, PA 116 and PA 194 were split into a one-way pair through downtown Hanover.

== Major intersections ==
County	Location	mi	km	Destinations	Notes
Adams	Carroll Valley	0.000	0.000	PA 16 (Waynesboro Pike) – Baltimore, Waynesboro, Hagerstown	Western terminus
Adams	Gettysburg	12.135	19.529	US 15 Bus. south (Baltimore Street) – Baltimore	Southern terminus of concurrency with US 15 BUS
Adams	Gettysburg	12.221	19.668	US 15 Bus. north (Carlisle Street) to PA 34 – Harrisburg US 30 west (Chambersburg Street)	Traffic circle, northern terminus of concurrency with US 15 BUS, western terminus of concurrency with US 30
Adams	Gettysburg	12.459	20.051	US 30 east (York Street) – York	Eastern terminus of concurrency with US 30
Adams	Straban Township	14.062– 14.081	22.631– 22.661	US 15 – Harrisburg, Frederick	Interchange
York	Hanover	26.094	41.994	PA 194 south (Chestnut Street) – Littlestown	Southbound PA 194 only, western terminus of concurrency with PA 194 southbound
York	Hanover	26.194	42.155	PA 194 north (Frederick Street)	Northbound PA 194 only, western terminus of concurrency with PA 194 northbound
York	Hanover	26.344	42.397	PA 94 (Carlisle Street/Baltimore Street)	
York	Hanover	26.401	42.488	PA 194 north (Broadway)	Eastern terminus of concurrency with PA 194
York	Penn Township	27.847	44.815	PA 216 east (Blooming Grove Road)	Western terminus of PA 216
York	North Codorus Township	34.626	55.725	PA 516 south (Jefferson Road) – Jefferson	Northern terminus of PA 516
York	West Manchester Township	39.799	64.050	US 30 (Lincoln Highway) – Gettysburg, York, Lancaster	Eastern terminus
1.000 mi = 1.609 km; 1.000 km = 0.621 mi: Concurrency terminus
