= Hamilton Township, Adams County, Pennsylvania =

Township in Pennsylvania, US

Coordinates: 39°53′00″N 77°01′59″W

- Township
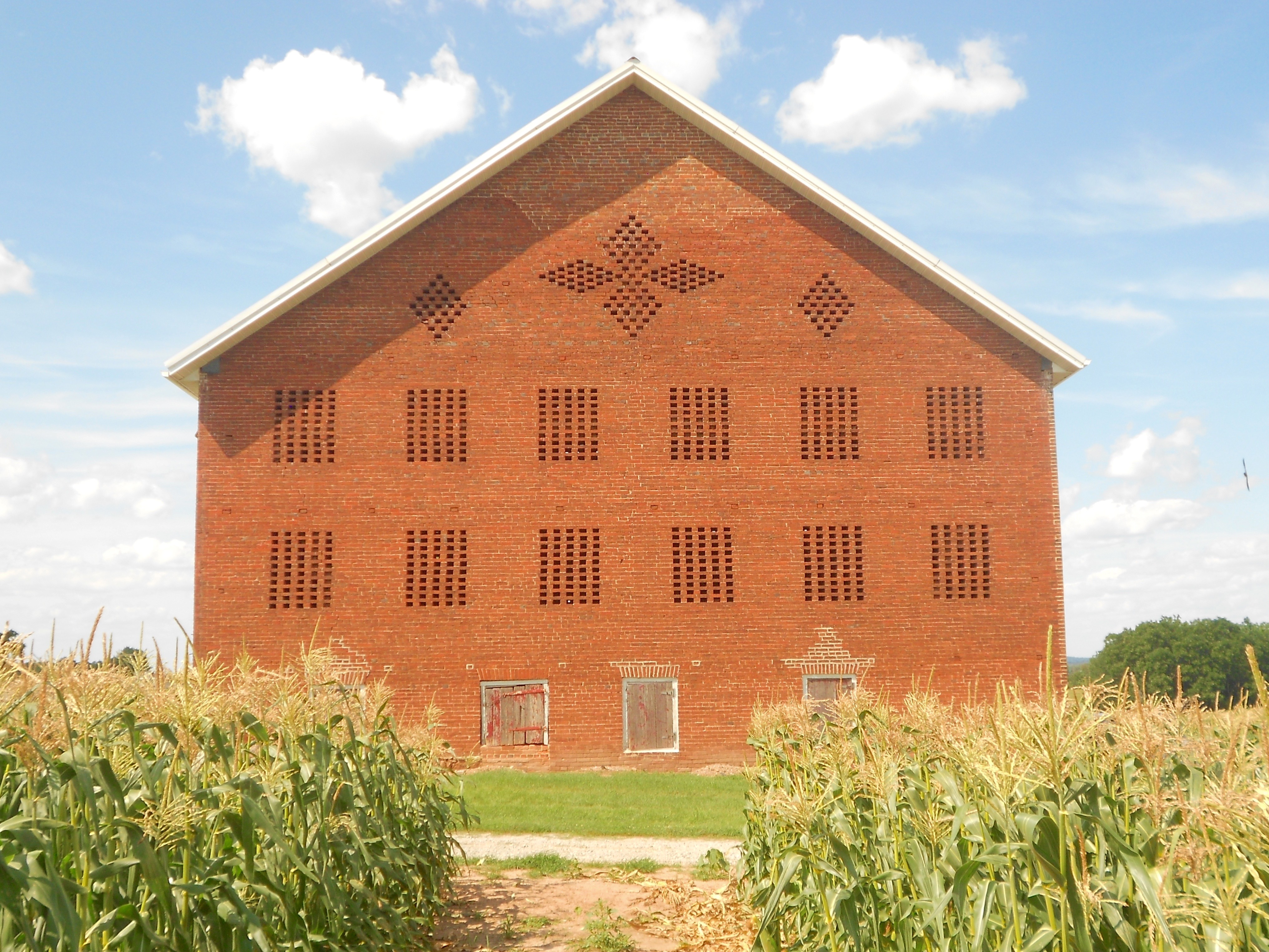
- Barn built in 1877

- Location in Adams County and the state of Pennsylvania.
- Country: United States
- State: Pennsylvania
- County: Adams
- Settled: 1734
- Incorporated: 1810

Area
  - Total: 13.65 sq mi (35.35 km^{2})
  - Land: 13.50 sq mi (34.97 km^{2})
  - Water: 0.14 sq mi (0.37 km^{2})

Population (2020)
  - Total: 2,712
  - Estimate (2023): 2,760
  - Density: 189.2/sq mi (73.05/km^{2})
- Time zone: UTC-5 (Eastern (EST))
  - Summer (DST): UTC-4 (EDT)
- Area code: 717
- FIPS code: 42-001-32144
- Website: https://twphamilton.com/

Hamilton Township is a township in Adams County, Pennsylvania, United States. The population was 2,712 at the 2020 census.

== Geography ==
Hamilton Township is located in eastern Adams County, adjacent to the boroughs of Abbottstown and East Berlin. Conewago Creek forms the northern boundary of the township. U.S. Route 30, the Lincoln Highway, forms the southern border and passes through Abbottstown. The highway leads 11 miles (18 km) west to Gettysburg and 16 miles (26 km) east to York. Pennsylvania Route 94 intersects U.S. 30 and leads north 10 miles (16 km) to York Springs and south 5 miles (8 km) to Hanover. Pennsylvania Route 194 runs north–south through the eastern portion of the township, connecting Abbottstown and East Berlin.

According to the United States Census Bureau, the township has a total area of 13.7 square miles (35.4 km^{2}), of which 13.5 square miles (35.0 km^{2}) is land and 0.15 square miles (0.4 km^{2}), or 1.06%, is water.

== Demographics ==
Historical population
Census	Pop.	Note	%±
2000	2,044		—
2010	2,530		23.8%
2020	2,712		7.2%
2023 (est.)	2,760		1.8%
U.S. Decennial Census

As of the census of 2000, there were 2,044 people, 740 households, and 591 families residing in the township. The population density was 149.1 inhabitants per square mile (57.6/km^{2}). There were 764 housing units at an average density of 55.7 per square mile (21.5/km^{2}). The racial makeup of the township was 98.09% White, 0.20% African American, 0.29% Asian, 0.78% from other races, and 0.64% from two or more races. Hispanic or Latino of any race were 1.71% of the population.

There were 740 households, out of which 34.7% had children under the age of 18 living with them, 71.1% were married couples living together, 5.7% had a female householder with no husband present, and 20.1% were non-families. 15.7% of all households were made up of individuals, and 6.8% had someone living alone who was 65 years of age or older. The average household size was 2.76 and the average family size was 3.09.

In the township the population was spread out, with 26.1% under the age of 18, 6.7% from 18 to 24, 29.9% from 25 to 44, 26.5% from 45 to 64, and 10.9% who were 65 years of age or older. The median age was 38 years. For every 100 females, there were 106.3 males. For every 100 females age 18 and over, there were 104.7 males.

The median income for a household in the township was $48,938, and the median income for a family was $53,523. Males had a median income of $37,500 versus $21,960 for females. The per capita income for the township was $19,659. About 3.3% of families and 5.2% of the population were below the poverty line, including 4.5% of those under age 18 and 9.5% of those age 65 or over.
