= Cross Keys, Pennsylvania =

Cross Keys is the name of several places in the U.S. state of Pennsylvania, including:

- Cross Keys, Adams County, Pennsylvania, an unincorporated community
- Cross Keys, Blair County, Pennsylvania, a census-designated place
