= South Western School District =

School district in Pennsylvania

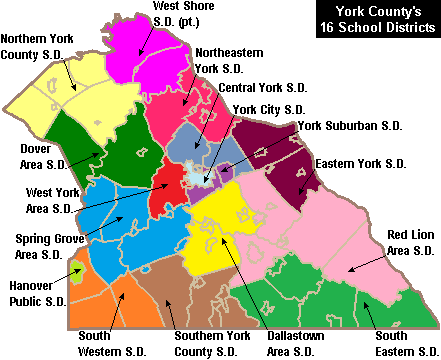

Address
- 225 Bowman Road Hanover, York County, Pennsylvania, 17331; United States

District information
- Type: Public

Other information
- Website: swsd.k12.pa.us

South Western School District is a midsized, suburban public school district in York County, Pennsylvania. It serves the townships of Penn Township, Manheim Township and West Manheim Township. It encompasses approximately 56 square miles (150 km^{2}). According to 2000 federal census data, South Western School District serves a resident population of 22,576 people. In 2010, the district's population increased to 26,768 people. By 2023, the district's population is estimated to be about 31,978 people In 2009, South Western School District residents’ per capita income was $20,618, while the median family income was $56,296. In the Commonwealth, the median family income was $49,501 and the United States median family income was $49,445, in 2010.

== District schools ==
- Baresville Elementary School
- Manheim Elementary School
- Park Hills Elementary School
- West Manheim Elementary School
- Emory H. Markle Middle School
- South Western High School

== Controversy ==
In September 2024, the school district made national news after it ordered its schools to install windows in the segregated bathrooms intended for transgender and nonbinary students, so that they could be monitored by those in the hallway. Board President Matthew Gelazela defended the installation, saying that “Our students should not consider the space outside of our stalls as private within the multiuser restrooms”. Such windows were not added to the non-transgender bathrooms.

== Extracurriculars ==
South Western School District's students have access to a variety of clubs, activities and an extensive sports program.The District funds:

Boys

- Baseball - AAAA
- Basketball- AAAA
- Cross Country - AAA
- Football - AAAA
- Golf - AAA
- Lacrosse - AAAA
- Soccer - AAA
- Swimming and Diving - AAA
- Tennis - AAA
- Track and Field - AAA
- Wrestling - AAA

Girls

- Basketball - AAAA
- Cheer - AAAA
- Cross Country - AAA
- Field Hockey - AAA
- Lacrosse - AAAA
- Soccer (Fall) - AAA
- Softball - AAAA
- Swimming and Diving - AAA
- Girls' Tennis - AAA
- Track and Field - AA
- Volleyball - AAA
- Wrestling - AAA

Markle Intermediate Sports

Boys

- Basketball
- Cross Country
- Football
- Track and Field
- Wrestling

Girls

- Basketball
- Cross Country
- Field Hockey
- Track and Field
- Volleyball
- Wrestling

According to PIAA directory July 2012
