= West Manheim Township, Pennsylvania =

Township in Pennsylvania, US

Coordinates: 39°44′50″N 76°57′09″W

West Manheim Township, York County, Pennsylvania
- Township
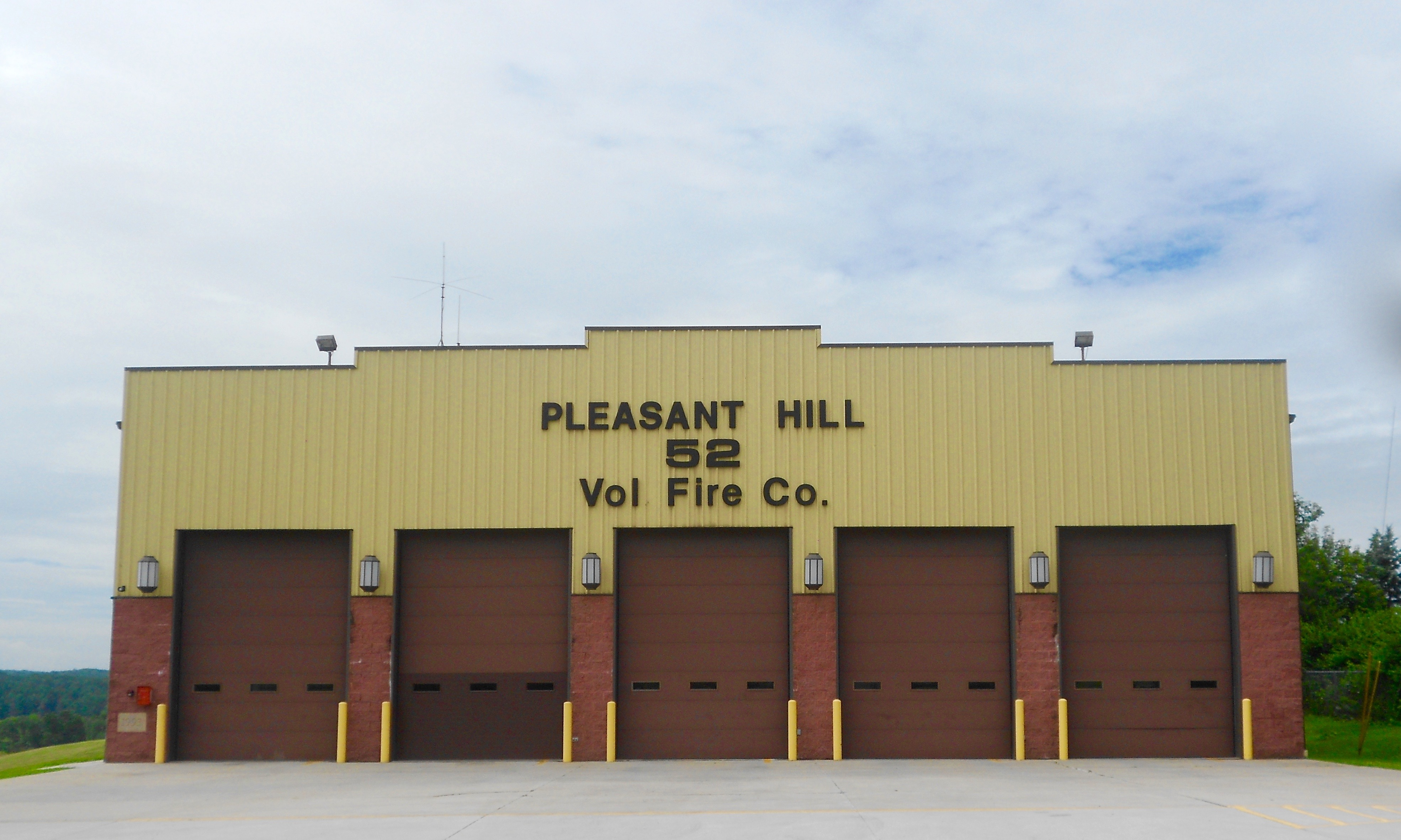
- Pleasant Hill Fire Station

- Location in York County and the state of Pennsylvania.
- Country: United States
- State: Pennsylvania
- County: York
- Settled: 1762
- Incorporated: 1858

Government
  - Type: Board of Supervisors

Area
  - Total: 20.10 sq mi (52.05 km^{2})
  - Land: 19.44 sq mi (50.34 km^{2})
  - Water: 0.66 sq mi (1.71 km^{2})

Population (2020)
  - Total: 9,069 ▲
  - Estimate (2023): 10,031
  - Density: 429.0/sq mi (165.65/km^{2})
- Time zone: UTC-5 (Eastern (EST))
  - Summer (DST): UTC-4 (EDT)
- ZIP Code: 17331
- Area code: 717
- FIPS code: 42-133-83440
- Website: www.westmanheimtwp.com

Historical population
Census	Pop.	Note	%±
2000	4,865		—
2010	7,744		59.2%
2020	9,069		17.1%
2023 (est.)	10,331		13.9%
U.S. Decennial Census

West Manheim Township is a township in York County, Pennsylvania, United States, just north of the Mason-Dixon Line. The population was 9,069 at the 2020 census.

== Geography ==
According to the United States Census Bureau, the township has a total area of 20.1 square miles (52 km^{2}), of which 19.5 square miles (51 km^{2}) is land and 0.6 square miles (1.6 km^{2}), or 3.23%, is water. The township occupies the southwestern corner of York County, with Union Township in Adams County to the west and Carroll County, Maryland, to the south. It is bordered on the east by Manheim Township and on the north by Penn Township. The southwestern corner of Codorus State Park is located in the township.

As for roadways, the township has roughly 70 miles of municipal roads, according to their website. Pennsylvania State Highway 94 runs through the township and becomes Maryland State Highway 30 at the border.

== Education ==
West Manheim Township is part of the South Western School District, and public school students attend their schools. However, all K-12 students in the Commonwealth of Pennsylvania can be enrolled in the state's cyber charter school.

== Media ==
West Manheim Township is officially classified as the Harrisburg television market (and receives all of its stations, including WHTM, WHP, WGAL and WPMT), however, due to proximity, Baltimore's stations WBAL, WMAR and WJZ can usually be picked up in the area and are available on Xfinity, which provides cable television and internet service to the township. As for newspaper service, the Hanover Evening Sun is the primary paper of circulation.

== Demographics ==
In 2020, the Census reported a population of 9,072 in the township, up from 7,744 in 2010. There were 3,059 households and 398.4 people per square mile. Much of this rapid growth can be attributed to the large number of new residents moving in, many from Maryland. The average commute time of 38.7 minutes can also be attributed to this.

94.3% of the township's residents identify their race to be White, followed by 3.7% Black or African-American, 0.7% were Asian and 1.4% were of two or more races. 1.4% were Hispanic or Latino of any race. 52% were female and 48% male.

The median household income in West Manheim Township was $76,379, and 4.1% of the township's residents live below the poverty line.

At the census of 2000, there were 4,865 people, 1,710 households, and 1,441 families living in the township. The population density was 249.8 inhabitants per square mile (96.4/km^{2}). There were 1,745 housing units at an average density of 89.6 units per square mile (34.6 units/km^{2}). The racial makeup of the township was 98.07% White, 0.82% African American, 0.06% Native American, 0.39% Asian, 0.02% Pacific Islander, 0.10% from other races, and 0.53% from two or more races. Hispanic or Latino of any race were 0.64% of the population.

There were 1,710 households, out of which 38.1% had children under the age of 18 living with them, 77.5% were married couples living together, 4.3% had a female householder with no husband present, and 15.7% were non-families. 12.6% of all households were made up of individuals, and 5.6% had someone living alone who was 65 years of age or older. The average household size was 2.84 and the average family size was 3.10.

In the township the population was spread out, with 25.8% under the age of 18, 6.6% from 18 to 24, 28.2% from 25 to 44, 28.8% from 45 to 64, and 10.6% who were 65 years of age or older. The median age was 40 years. For every 100 females, there were 103.8 males. For every 100 females age 18 and over, there were 101.7 males.

The median income for a household in the township was $57,437, and the median income for a family was $60,014. Males had a median income of $39,209 versus $28,668 for females. The per capita income for the township was $21,670. About 0.8% of families and 1.5% of the population were below the poverty line, including 1.5% of those under age 18 and 2.0% of those age 65 or over.
