= Pennville, Pennsylvania =

Unincorporated place in Pennsylvania, US

Pennville
- Census-designated place
- Location in York County and the U.S. state of Pennsylvania.
- Coordinates: 39°47′12″N 76°59′31″W
- Country: United States
- State: Pennsylvania
- County: York
- Township: Penn

Area
  - Total: 0.95 sq mi (2.47 km^{2})
  - Land: 0.95 sq mi (2.47 km^{2})
  - Water: 0 sq mi (0.00 km^{2})
- Elevation: 584 ft (178 m)

Population (2020)
  - Total: 2,430
  - Density: 2,544.8/sq mi (982.54/km^{2})
- Time zone: UTC-5 (Eastern (EST))
  - Summer (DST): UTC-4 (EDT)
- ZIP code: 17331
- Area code: 717
- FIPS code: 42-59296
- GNIS feature ID: 2389662

Pennville is a census-designated place (CDP) in York County, Pennsylvania, United States. The population was 1,947 at the 2010 census.

== Geography ==
Pennville is located in Penn Township, adjacent to the borough of Hanover.

According to the United States Census Bureau, the CDP has a total area of 0.7 square miles (1.8 km^{2}), all land.

== Demographics ==
Historical population
Census	Pop.	Note	%±
2020	2,430		—
U.S. Decennial Census

At the 2000 census there were 1,964 people, 659 households, and 461 families living in the CDP. The population density was 2,718.1 inhabitants per square mile (1,049.5/km^{2}). There were 682 housing units at an average density of 943.9 per square mile (364.4/km^{2}). The racial makeup of the CDP was 98.01% White, 0.46% African American, 0.10% Native American, 0.41% Asian, 0.51% from other races, and 0.51% from two or more races. Hispanic or Latino of any race were 0.92%.

Of the 659 households 31.7% had children under the age of 18 living with them, 54.6% were married couples living together, 10.6% had a female householder with no husband present, and 29.9% were non-families. 22.8% of households were one person and 8.3% were one person aged 65 or older. The average household size was 2.51 and the average family size was 2.94.

The age distribution was 21.1% under the age of 18, 6.5% from 18 to 24, 27.0% from 25 to 44, 17.4% from 45 to 64, and 28.0% 65 or older. The median age was 42 years. For every 100 females, there were 82.9 males. For every 100 females age 18 and over, there were 77.2 males.

The median household income was $38,934 and the median family income was $47,841. Males had a median income of $36,231 versus $21,520 for females. The per capita income for the CDP was $18,252. None of the families and 3.3% of the population were living below the poverty line, including no under eighteens and 13.7% of those over 64.
