= Henry Louis Baugher =

American minister (1804–1868)

Henry Lewis Baugher

Henry Louis Baugher (July 18, 1804 – April 14, 1868) was an American Lutheran clergyman and academic. From 1850 to 1868, he served as president of Gettysburg College.

== Early life and education ==
Baugher was born in Abbottstown, Pennsylvania, on July 18, 1804, to Christian Frederick Baugher and Catherine Ann Elizabeth (Mottere) Baugher. His father was a tanner by trade and his paternal grandfather, John George Bager, was a pioneer German Lutheran pastor west of Pennsylvania's Susquehanna River. As a youth, Henry was educated by the Reverend David McConaughy of Gettysburg.

Baugher entered Dickinson College in 1822 and was admitted to the Belles Lettres Literary Society that same year. He graduated as part of the Class of 1826. At the commencement ceremony, Baugher, who received secondary honors, gave the Latin Salutatory Address.

After graduating from Dickinson, Baugher made arrangements to study law under Francis Scott Key, in Georgetown. After his mother's death, Baugher changed plans and entered the Princeton Theological Seminary in 1826. He studied there until 1828, when he transferred to the Lutheran Theological Seminary at Gettysburg where he stayed for one year. He was licensed in the Lutheran ministry of the Synod of West Pennsylvania in 1828.

== Career ==
In 1831, Baugher became a teacher of classical studies at Gettysburg Gymnasium, which was then under the seminary. The gymnasium became Pennsylvania College, now Gettysburg College, in 1832. Baugher was selected as professor of Greek and the Belles Lettres. He served in this position for 18 years, and also served as the Secretary for the Faculty of the college. He was ordained a Lutheran pastor in 1833. His brother, Isaac, became a college trustee in 1844 and gave the college its first bequest.

In 1848, Henry Baugher received an honorary doctorate of divinity from his alma mater. After College President Charles P. Krauth resigned his position in 1850, the Board of Trustees unanimously voted Baugher the second president of Pennsylvania College and later decided to build a home for him and his family. After initially rejecting the position, he accepted and assumed his duties in October of the same year, not to relinquish them until his death in 1868.

During the American Civil War, Gettysburg College stood in its midst. Elements of the two conflicting armies swept through campus on July 1, 1863, the first day of the decisive Battle of Gettysburg. Pennsylvania Hall at Gettysburg College became a hospital for wounded soldiers from both sides of the conflict. On November 19, 1863, Baugher gave the benediction at the ceremony opening the cemetery at Gettysburg. The Rev. Baugher's benediction was:

“O Thou King of Kings and Lord of lords, God of the nations of the earth, who, by Thy kind providence, has permitted us to engage in these solemn services, grant us Thy blessing. Bless this consecrated ground, and these holy graves. Bless the President of these United States, and his Cabinet. Bless the Governors and the Representatives of the States here assembled with all needed grace to conduct the affairs committed into their hands, to the glory of Thy name, and greatest good of the people. May this great nation be delivered from treason and rebellion at home, and from the power of enemies abroad. And now, may the grace of our Lord Jesus Christ, the love of God our Heavenly Father, and the fellowship of the Holy Ghost, be with you all. Amen.”

This prayer came after Abraham Lincoln's famous Gettysburg Address.

Baugher's presidency of Gettysburg College was noted by his stern disciplinary practices and high standards. According to Edward S. Breidenbaugh, Baugher believed "that reverence for superiors, submission to authority, and obedience to the rules and regulations of the College were indispensable to the formation of a good character, he inculcated and enforced the duty of loyalty both by counsel and authority . . . [and] he was proficient in detecting those guilty of misdemeanors and violations of the college laws." According to Samuel Gring Hefelbower, who was president of Gettysburg College from 1904 to 1910, Baugher's severity was "tempered with Christian love."

== Personal life ==
In 1829, Baugher was married to Clara (Clarissa) Mary Brooks. Baugher died in 1868. He was buried in the Evergreen Cemetery in Gettysburg, Pennsylvania along with his wife and a number of other family members.
