= John Abbott House =

Historic house in Pennsylvania, United States

- U.S. National Register of Historic Places
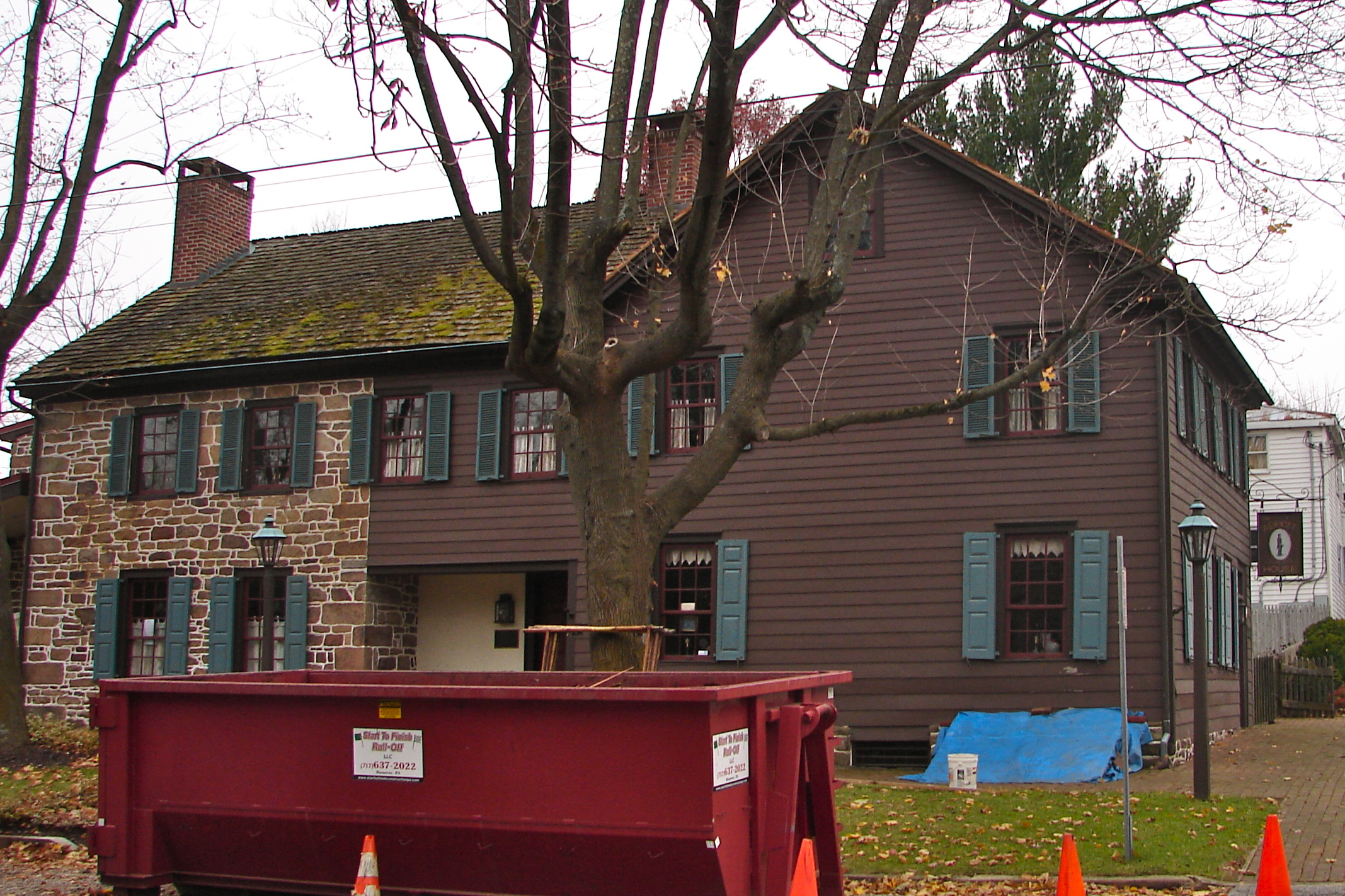
- John Abbott House in November 2010

- Location within Pennsylvania Location within the United States
- Location: South side of E. King St., Abbottstown, Pennsylvania
- Coordinates: 39°53′14″N 76°58′55″W
- Area: 0.4 acres (0.16 ha)
- NRHP reference No.: 80003394
- Added to NRHP: February 22, 1980

The John Abbott House is a historic house located on King Street in Abbottstown, Adams County, Pennsylvania, United States. It was listed on the National Register of Historic Places on February 22, 1980.

== Description and history ==
It is a two-story building made of wood, stone, and brick. It consists of the original log dwelling dated to about 1740, and sheathed in clapboard, with an extension added between 1830 and 1850, incorporating the original stone kitchen and brick addition. A one-story wood lean-to was added between 1915 and 1930. The house measures 28 feet (8.5 m) by 67 feet (20 m). The house operated as a tavern between 1750 and about 1763.

Restoration work on the home was completed in 1981 by the owner, Yvonne Nace, her consulting architect, Thomas Spiers, her contractor, Edward H. Nace, the carpenter, William Helker, and the painter, Ralph Miller.

It was listed on the National Register of Historic Places on February 22, 1980.

== See also ==
- National Register of Historic Places listings in Adams County, Pennsylvania
