= Pennsylvania Route 97 (Adams County) =

State highway in Adams County, Pennsylvania, US

Pennsylvania Route 97
- Pennsylvania Route 97 highlighted in red

Route information
- Maintained by PennDOT
- Length: 9.363 mi (15.068 km)
- Existed: 1979–present

Major junctions
- South end: MD 97 near Littlestown
- PA 194 in Littlestown
- North end: US 15 near Gettysburg

Location
- Country: United States
- State: Pennsylvania
- Counties: Adams

Highway system
- Pennsylvania State Route System; Interstate; US; State; Scenic; Legislative
← PA 96	→ PA 98

Pennsylvania Route 97 (PA 97) is one of two Pennsylvania state highways that carries the PA 97 designation; the other PA 97 is in Erie County. This southern PA 97, known for most of its length as Baltimore Pike, runs 9.363 miles (15.068 km) from the Maryland state line near Littlestown, where the highway continues as Maryland Route 97 (MD 97), northwest to U.S. Route 15 (US 15) near Gettysburg. PA 97 connects Gettysburg and Littlestown in southeastern Adams County. The highway also links those communities with Westminster and Baltimore. From PA 97's northern end, Baltimore Pike continues toward Gettysburg as State Route 2035 (SR 2035) through the Gettysburg Battlefield Historic District, where it provides access to the Gettysburg Museum and Visitor Center.

Baltimore Pike was built as a turnpike in the early 19th century to connect Gettysburg, Littlestown, and Baltimore. The turnpike was a prominent linear feature during the 1863 Battle of Gettysburg despite not being the focus of a particular skirmish. Baltimore Pike was designated one of the original legislative routes in the early 1910s and became the northernmost part of US 140 in the late 1920s. The U.S. Highway was widened and resurfaced in the 1940s. When the US 140 designation was retired in the late 1970s, the highway became PA 97 to match the adjacent Maryland highway. With the creation of PA 97, the route had its northern terminus at the US 15 interchange while Baltimore Pike north of there became unnumbered.

== Route description ==
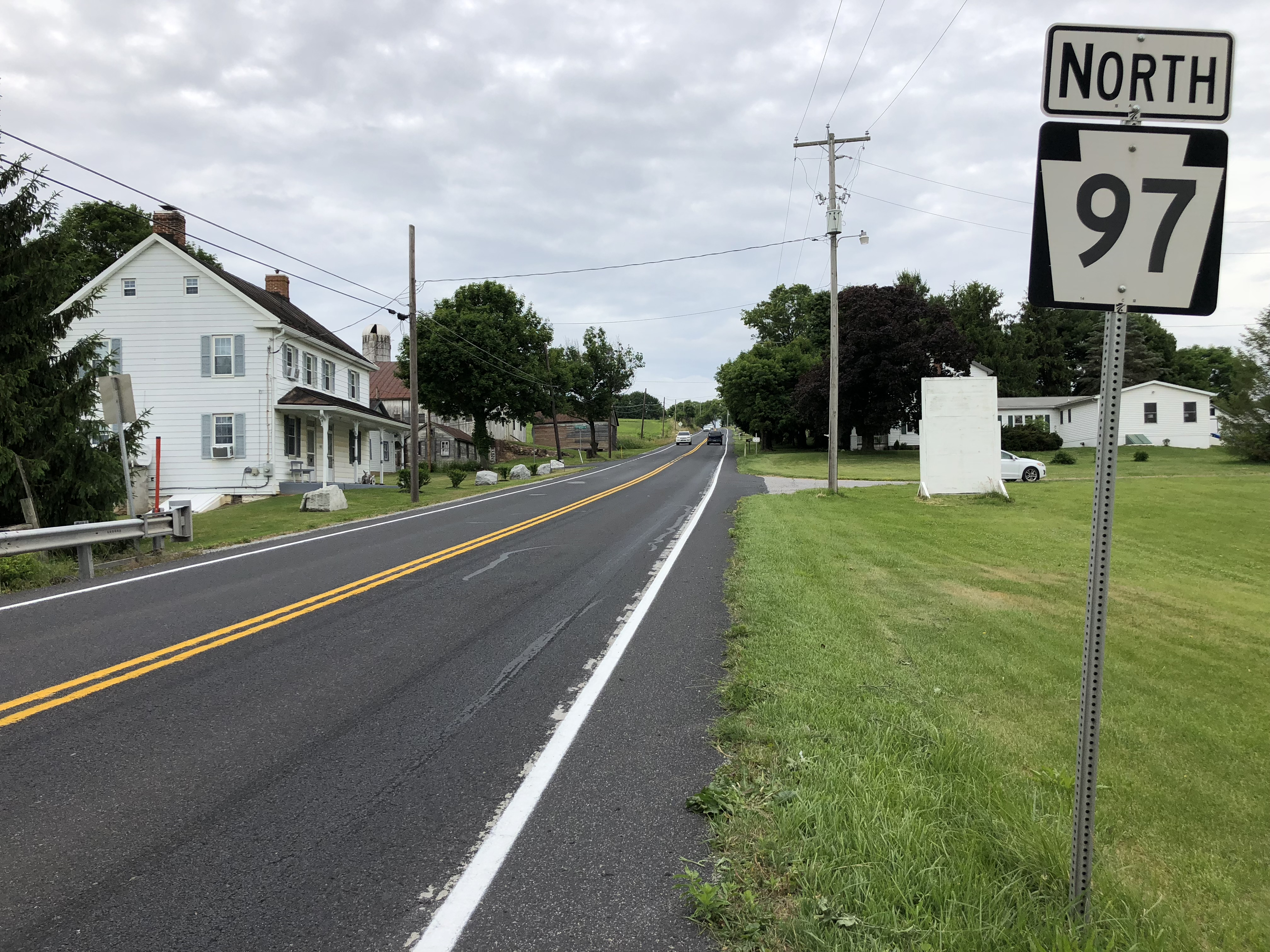
PA 97 northbound past its southern terminus at MD 97 at the Maryland border in Germany Township

PA 97 begins at the Maryland state line in Germany Township. The highway continues south as MD 97 (Littlestown Pike) toward Westminster. PA 97 heads northwest along two-lane Baltimore Pike. The highway crosses Piney Creek and enters the borough of Littlestown, through which the highway follows Queen Street. PA 97 intersects PA 194 (King Street) in the center of the borough. The state highway becomes Baltimore Pike again upon leaving Littlestown and re-entering Germany Township. PA 97 crosses Alloway Creek into Mount Joy Township. The highway crosses Plum Creek east of the hamlet of Germantown and Littles Run within Two Taverns. PA 97 widens to a four-lane divided highway at its crossing of Plum Run just south of Lake Heritage, which is also the name of the surrounding residential development. The state highway passes north of The Outlet Shoppes at Gettysburg and reaches its northern terminus at its diamond interchange with US 15. Baltimore Pike continues northwest as SR 2035, an unsigned quadrant route, through the Gettysburg Battlefield Historic District toward the Gettysburg Museum and Visitor Center, Evergreen Cemetery, several units of Gettysburg National Military Park, and the borough of Gettysburg.

== History ==
The Gettysburg and Petersburg Turnpike Company was chartered in March 1807 to construct an artificial road from Gettysburg through Petersburg (now Littlestown) to the Maryland state line along the stagecoach route between Baltimore and Chambersburg. Baltimore Pike, as it was known colloquially, was a prominent linear feature during the Battle of Gettysburg as it lay along the side of Cemetery Hill and to the west of Culp's Hill. Cemetery Hill served as the tip of the Union forces' "fishhook" defensive formation throughout the three-day battle. Baltimore Pike ran parallel to the Union defensive lines during the Battle of East Cemetery Hill, a Confederate offensive against Culp's Hill and Cemetery Hill that started late on July 2 and finished early on July 3, 1863. During and in the time after the battle, the turnpike was lined with several field hospitals, many of which were created in the homes and on the land of civilians such as Henry Spangler.

In May 1911, the Pennsylvania General Assembly passed the Sproul Roads Act, which created the Pennsylvania state road system and allowed the state to take over turnpikes. Baltimore Pike was designated Legislative Route 42 from the Maryland state line northwest to the borough of Gettysburg. The Sproul Roads Act was challenged as being unconstitutional, but the Pennsylvania Supreme Court upheld the legislation on June 27, 1913. The state took over the Gettysburg and Petersburg Turnpike and abolished tolls the next day, just in time for the March to Gettysburg ahead of the 1913 Gettysburg reunion. Baltimore Pike was improved as a macadam road from the state line to Gettysburg by 1916. The highway from the state line to US 15 at the intersection of Baltimore Street and Steinwehr Avenue (then Emmitsburg Road) was designated the northernmost part of US 140 in 1927. US 140 was widened and resurfaced with concrete from Gettysburg to Littlestown between 1941 and 1943. The remainder of the highway through Littlestown to the Maryland state line was widened and resurfaced with asphalt between 1943 and 1953. US 140's interchange with modern US 15 was completed when the then–two-lane US 15 bypass opened in June 1963, immediately before the centennial of the Battle of Gettysburg.

In 1977, plans were made for US 140 to be decommissioned, with PA 97 to replace the section in Pennsylvania. This proposal was made in order to eliminate short routes from the United States Numbered Highways system. The American Association of State Highway and Transportation Officials approved the removal of the US 140 designation on October 28, 1977. In December 1978, the borough of Littlestown protested the renumbering of US 140 to PA 97. When the US 140 designation was retired on January 1, 1979, it was replaced by MD 140 from Baltimore to Westminster, and Maryland and Pennsylvania coordinated to have matching routes 97 on both sides of the state line between Westminster and Gettysburg. The northern terminus of PA 97 was located at the US 15 interchange, while the stretch of the former US 140 north into Gettysburg became unnumbered Baltimore Pike. With this change, the US 140 signs were removed from the square in downtown Gettysburg, and no signs directing motorists to PA 97 were put in their place. This move hurt businesses in the Littlestown area as motorists were unable to get to them without a marked route. The state did put signs directing motorists to PA 97 at the US 15 interchange and at the intersection of US 15 Business and Baltimore Street; however, signs for PA 97 were not placed in the square due to opposition from local officials in Gettysburg who did not want sign clutter in the square. The stretch of Baltimore Pike from the bypass to US 15 Business became SR 2035 by 1989. PA 97 and the adjacent portion of Baltimore Pike were widened through the US 15 interchange in 2000.

== Major intersections ==
The entire route is in Adams County.

Location	mi	km	Destinations	Notes
Germany Township	0.000	0.000	MD 97 south (Littlestown Pike) – Baltimore	Maryland state line; southern terminus
Littlestown	2.109	3.394	PA 194 (King Street) – Frederick, Hanover	
Mount Joy Township	9.363	15.068	US 15 – Frederick, Harrisburg; SR 2035 north (Baltimore Pike) – Gettysburg	Diamond interchange; northern terminus
1.000 mi = 1.609 km; 1.000 km = 0.621 mi
