= Cross Keys, Adams County, Pennsylvania =

Unincorporated community in Pennsylvania, US

Coordinates: 39°52′15″N 77°01′39″W

Cross Keys is an unincorporated community in Adams County, Pennsylvania, United States. Cross Keys is located on U.S. Route 30, approximately two miles east of New Oxford at the junction with Pennsylvania Route 94.
