= East Berlin, Pennsylvania =

Borough in Pennsylvania, US

- Borough
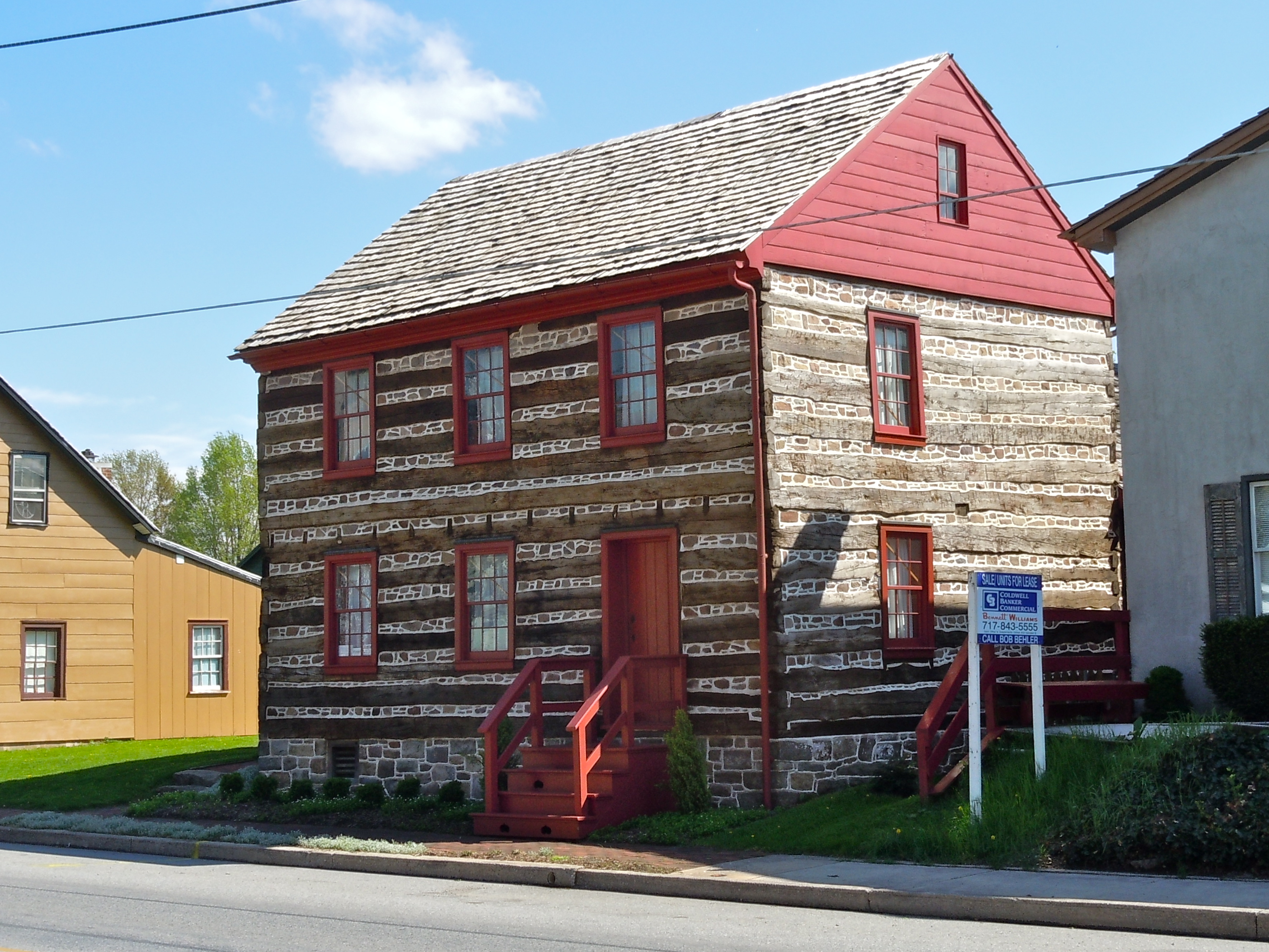

- Coat of arms

- Location in Adams County and the U.S. state of Pennsylvania.

- Location in Pennsylvania and the United States East Berlin (the United States)
- Coordinates: 39°56′16″N 76°58′51″W
- Country: United States
- State: Pennsylvania
- County: Adams
- Settled: 1764
- Incorporated: 1879

Government
  - Type: Borough Council

Area
  - Total: 0.73 sq mi (1.89 km^{2})
  - Land: 0.70 sq mi (1.82 km^{2})
  - Water: 0.027 sq mi (0.07 km^{2})
- Elevation: 443 ft (135 m)

Population (2020)
  - Total: 1,542
  - Density: 2,194.4/sq mi (847.27/km^{2})
- Time zone: UTC-5 (Eastern (EST))
  - Summer (DST): UTC-4 (EDT)
- Zip code: 17316
- Area codes: 717 and 223
- FIPS code: 42-20792
- Website: eastberlinboro.com

East Berlin is a borough in Adams County, Pennsylvania, United States. The population was 1,542 at the 2020 census.

East Berlin is located in the southern part of Pennsylvania, adjacent to the York County border and 13 miles (21 km) west of York.

== History ==
=== Pre-colonization and early development ===
Prior to the arrival of European settlers, the area in what would become East Berlin was inhabited by the Susquehannock Native Americans. As early as 1734, German, Irish, Dutch, and Quaker settlers began occupying land in what would later become Adams County. Following the 1736 signing of a treaty in Philadelphia between Thomas Penn and members of the Six Nations, many settlers began safely moving to the area.

In 1764, John Frankenberger purchased two hundred acres of land from Thomas and Richard Penn, the sons of William Penn. He divided it into eighty-five lots with streets and alleys and named it "Berlin" after Berlin, Germany, then the capital of the Kingdom of Prussia, his native country. Subsequently, confusion with another community in Pennsylvania led to altering the name to "East Berlin." By 1797, under the new owner John Hildebrand, East Berlin had approximately one hundred houses. When York County was divided in 1800, East Berlin became part of the newly created Adams County.

=== 19th Century and the Civil War ===
For much of its early history, East Berlin was not legally a borough with its own municipal government, but a part of neighboring Hamilton Township; on November 10, 1879, after town residents petitioned the Court of Adams County, 407 acres of land around the community were officially designated as the borough of East Berlin. The town would maintain basic infrastructure like streets, sidewalks, curbs, and oil lamps. The borough built a water reservoir in 1897. Congressman and abolitionist Thaddeus Stevens briefly owned property in East Berlin from 1832 to 1848 before moving to Lancaster.

During the Gettysburg Campaign of the Civil War, Jubal Early's Confederate troops marched twice through East Berlin, only a few days before the Battle of Gettysburg would take place. Many residents, aware that the soldiers would pillage and loot for supplies, left milk and other supplies outside their homes, hoping to appease the soldiers. There are other stories of incidents between residents of East Berlin and the Confederate soldiers: after spotting women baking bread in the communal ovens, Confederate soldiers allegedly forced the women to hand over the bread they had made. Other folklore suggests that an unidentified man in the second story of the tavern on King Street shot at the Confederates as they passed through town, and that two families with the name Lincoln from nearby Dover hid in East Berlin after hearing that Confederates would kill anyone they met named "Lincoln." Early himself spent the night at the Zinn farmhouse (named after the woman who owned it) just west of the town on June 27, where he was treated to a variety of Pennsylvania Dutch dishes.

In 1877, the Berlin Branch Railroad was completed, linking the town to Berlin Junction on the Hanover Junction, Hanover and Gettysburg Railroad. The railroad operated until 1914, when the tracks were removed from East Berlin to Abbottstown. The rail line was relaid in 1916 and continued to operate as the East Berlin Railroad until 1939. The tracks were again removed in 1940.

=== 20th century ===
In 1921, power lines were constructed in East Berlin, as well as neighboring Abbottstown. 1933 marked the first year that natural gas piping was operational in the town. In the 1950s, the East Berlin Municipal Authority was created, which began to construct a sewage and water treatment facility. Despite some cave-ins during construction of the lines, no major injuries were sustained during its difficult construction, and the project was completed in February 1957.

American diplomat George F. Kennan bought a farm in East Berlin in 1942. Following his work in President Harry S. Truman's administration, he used it as a secondary home while he worked at the Institute for Advanced Study in Princeton, New Jersey. He owned it until his death in 2005. In 1967, Kennan had his daughter Grace house Svetlana Stalina, the daughter of Joseph Stalin, in their home in East Berlin following her defection to the United States, where she stayed for the summer; Grace admits that the people of East Berlin did not "know they had a mysterious visitor in their midst."

The East Berlin Historic District was added to the National Register of Historic Places in 1985.

== Geography ==
East Berlin is located at 39°56′16″N 76°58′51″W (39.937890, -76.980942).

According to the United States Census Bureau, the borough has a total area of 0.7 square miles (1.8 km^{2}), all land.

East Berlin is at the junction of State highways 194 and 234.

== Education ==
East Berlin is served by the Bermudian Springs School District.

== Demographics ==
Historical population
Census	Pop.	Note	%±
1820	418		—
1880	510		—
1890	595		16.7%
1900	668		12.3%
1910	672		0.6%
1920	616		−8.3%
1930	790		28.2%
1940	792		0.3%
1950	913		15.3%
1960	1,037		13.6%
1970	1,086		4.7%
1980	1,054		−2.9%
1990	1,175		11.5%
2000	1,365		16.2%
2010	1,521		11.4%
2020	1,542		1.4%

As of the census of 2000, there were 1,365 people, 557 households, and 387 families residing in the borough. The population density was 1,962.1 inhabitants per square mile (757.6/km^{2}). There were 588 housing units at an average density of 845.2 per square mile (326.3/km^{2}). The racial makeup of the borough was 97.44% White, 0.51% African American, 0.15% Native American, 0.29% Asian, 0.88% from other races, and 0.73% from two or more races. Hispanic or Latino of any race were 2.86% of the population.

There were 557 households, out of which 34.1% had children under the age of 18 living with them, 56.0% were married couples living together, 10.4% had a female householder with no husband present, and 30.5% were non-families. 26.0% of all households were made up of individuals, and 11.5% had someone living alone who was 65 years of age or older. The average household size was 2.45 and the average family size was 2.95.

In the borough the population was spread out, with 26.4% under the age of 18, 8.1% from 18 to 24, 32.0% from 25 to 44, 18.2% from 45 to 64, and 15.3% who were 65 years of age or older. The median age was 35 years. For every 100 females, there were 86.2 males. For every 100 females age 18 and over, there were 88.0 males.

The median income for a household in the borough was $38,819, and the median income for a family was $43,646. Males had a median income of $34,659 versus $21,971 for females. The per capita income for the borough was $19,818. About 5.7% of families and 6.7% of the population were below the poverty line, including 10.5% of those under age 18 and 5.2% of those age 65 or over.

== See also ==
- Berlin, Pennsylvania
- Berlin Township, Wayne County, Pennsylvania
- New Berlin, Pennsylvania
- New Berlinville, Pennsylvania
- Hamilton Township, Adams County, Pennsylvania adjacent township to the south
- Reading Township, Pennsylvania adjacent township to the north
