= Parkville, Pennsylvania =

Unincorporated place in Pennsylvania, US

Parkville
- Census-designated place
- Location in York County and the U.S. state of Pennsylvania.
- Coordinates: 39°47′09″N 76°58′07″W
- Country: United States
- State: Pennsylvania
- County: York
- Township: Penn

Area
  - Total: 2.92 sq mi (7.55 km^{2})
  - Land: 2.92 sq mi (7.55 km^{2})
  - Water: 0 sq mi (0.00 km^{2})
- Elevation: 692 ft (211 m)

Population (2020)
  - Total: 8,263
  - Density: 2,835.2/sq mi (1,094.68/km^{2})
- Time zone: UTC-5 (Eastern (EST))
  - Summer (DST): UTC-4 (EDT)
- ZIP code: 17331
- Area code: 717
- FIPS code: 42-58240
- GNIS feature ID: 2389643

Parkville is a census-designated place (CDP) in York County, Pennsylvania, United States. The population was 6,706 at the 2010 census.

== Geography ==
Parkville is located in Penn Township, adjacent to the borough of Hanover.

According to the United States Census Bureau, the CDP has a total area of 2.9 square miles (7.5 km^{2}), all land.

== Demographics ==
Historical population
Census	Pop.	Note	%±
2020	8,263		—
U.S. Decennial Census

At the 2000 census there were 6,593 people, 2,611 households, and 1,832 families living in the CDP. The population density was 2,243.0 inhabitants per square mile (866.0/km^{2}). There were 2,751 housing units at an average density of 935.9 per square mile (361.4/km^{2}). The racial makeup of the CDP was 97.10% White, 0.55% African American, 0.20% Native American, 0.97% Asian, 0.05% Pacific Islander, 0.55% from other races, and 0.59% from two or more races. Hispanic or Latino of any race were 1.35%.

Of the 2,611 households 34.9% had children under the age of 18 living with them, 55.1% were married couples living together, 10.1% had a female householder with no husband present, and 29.8% were non-families. 24.2% of households were one person and 8.6% were one person aged 65 or older. The average household size was 2.53 and the average family size was 2.99.

The age distribution was 26.4% under the age of 18, 7.5% from 18 to 24, 32.9% from 25 to 44, 20.8% from 45 to 64, and 12.4% 65 or older. The median age was 35 years. For every 100 females, there were 95.8 males. For every 100 females age 18 and over, there were 94.0 males.

The median household income was $44,419 and the median family income was $48,417. Males had a median income of $34,310 versus $24,659 for females. The per capita income for the CDP was $18,815. About 2.8% of families and 4.2% of the population were below the poverty line, including 4.3% of those under age 18 and 0.9% of those age 65 or over.
