= Franklintown, Pennsylvania =

Borough in Pennsylvania, US

- Borough
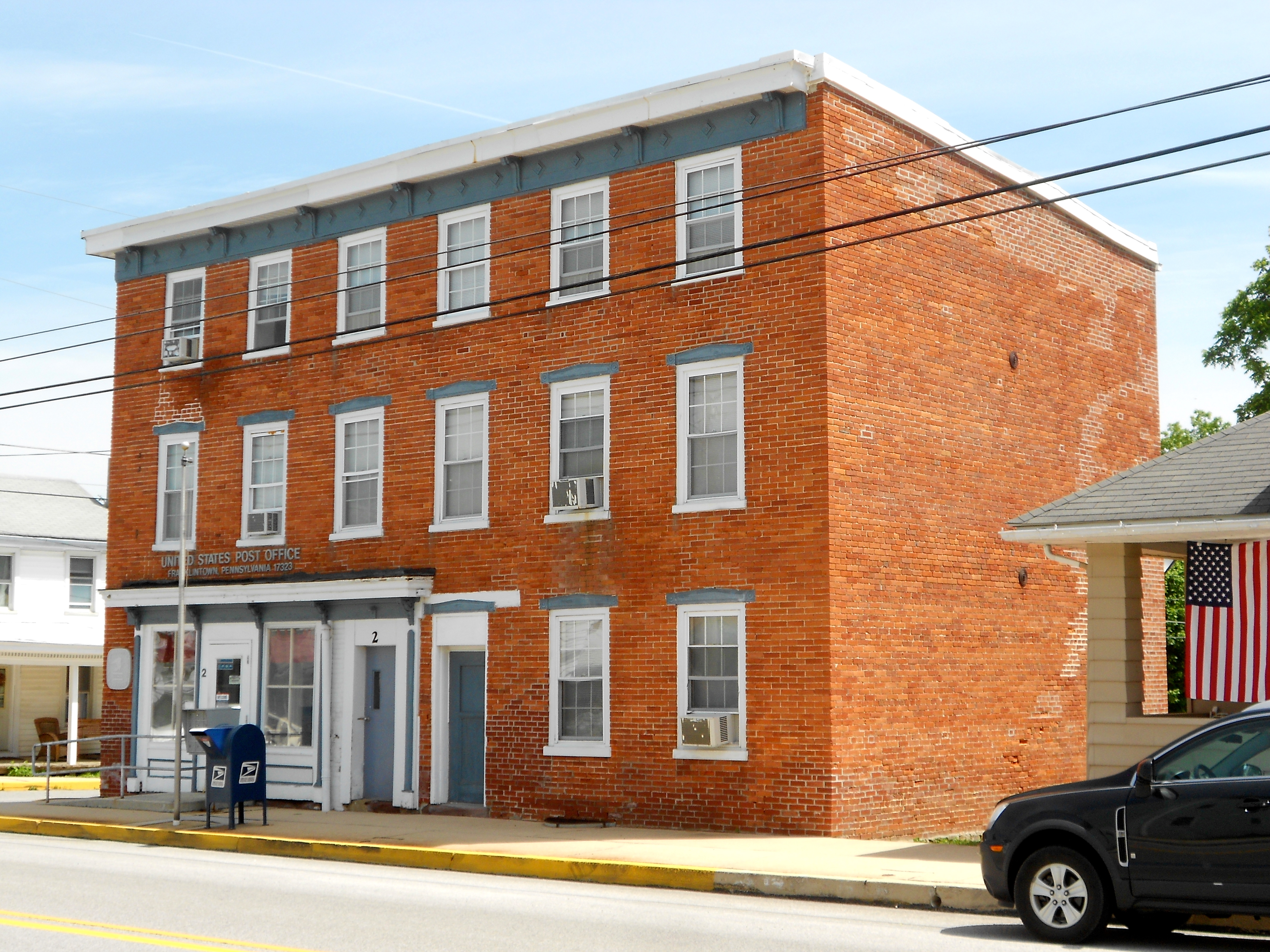
- Franklintown's post office

- Location in York County and the U.S. state of Pennsylvania.

- Location of Franklintown in Pennsylvania Franklintown (the United States)
- Coordinates: 40°04′36″N 77°01′47″W
- Country: United States
- State: Pennsylvania
- County: York
- Settled: 1813
- Incorporated: 1869

Government
  - Type: Borough Council
  - Mayor: Robert Wolfe
  - Borough Council President: Richard Blouch

Area
  - Total: 0.25 sq mi (0.66 km^{2})
  - Land: 0.25 sq mi (0.66 km^{2})
  - Water: 0 sq mi (0.00 km^{2})
- Elevation: 367 ft (112 m)

Population (2020)
  - Total: 508
  - Density: 2,027.4/sq mi (782.78/km^{2})
- Time zone: UTC-5 (Eastern (EST))
  - Summer (DST): UTC-4 (EDT)
- Zip code: 17323
- Area code: 717
- FIPS code: 42-27576
- Website: Franklintown's website

Franklintown is also the name of a neighborhood in Philadelphia.

Franklintown is a borough in York County, Pennsylvania, United States. The population was 508 at the 2020 census. It is part of the York–Hanover metropolitan area.

== Geography ==
Franklintown is located at 40°4′36″N 77°1′47″W (40.076671, -77.029619).

According to the United States Census Bureau, the borough has a total area of 0.2 square miles (0.52 km^{2}), all land.

== Demographics ==
Historical population
Census	Pop.	Note	%±
1850	82		—
1870	181		—
1880	234		29.3%
1890	232		−0.9%
1900	250		7.8%
1910	216		−13.6%
1920	187		−13.4%
1930	255		36.4%
1940	296		16.1%
1950	328		10.8%
1960	287		−12.5%
1970	279		−2.8%
1980	280		0.4%
1990	373		33.2%
2000	532		42.6%
2010	489		−8.1%
2020	518		5.9%
2023 (est.)	543	▲	4.8%

As of the census of 2000, there were 532 people, 211 households, and 147 families living in the borough. The population density was 2,154.3 inhabitants per square mile (831.8/km^{2}). There were 222 housing units at an average density of 899.0 units per square mile (347.1 units/km^{2}). The racial makeup of the borough was 98.68% White, 0.19% African American, 0.56% Native American and 0.56% Asian. Hispanic or Latino of any race were 0.94% of the population.

There were 211 households, out of which 38.4% had children under the age of 18 living with them, 54.0% were married couples living together, 11.8% had a female householder with no husband present, and 30.3% were non-families. 21.8% of all households were made up of individuals, and 3.3% had someone living alone who was 65 years of age or older. The average household size was 2.52 and the average family size was 2.93.

In the borough the population was spread out, with 29.1% under the age of 18, 8.5% from 18 to 24, 44.4% from 25 to 44, 12.6% from 45 to 64, and 5.5% who were 65 years of age or older. The median age was 29 years. For every 100 females there were 100.8 males. For every 100 females age 18 and over, there were 89.4 males.

The median income for a household in the borough was $43,409, and the median income for a family was $47,813. Males had a median income of $33,571 versus $22,315 for females. The per capita income for the borough was $18,882. About 6.7% of families and 9.6% of the population were below the poverty line, including 19.7% of those under age 18 and 6.9% of those age 65 or over.

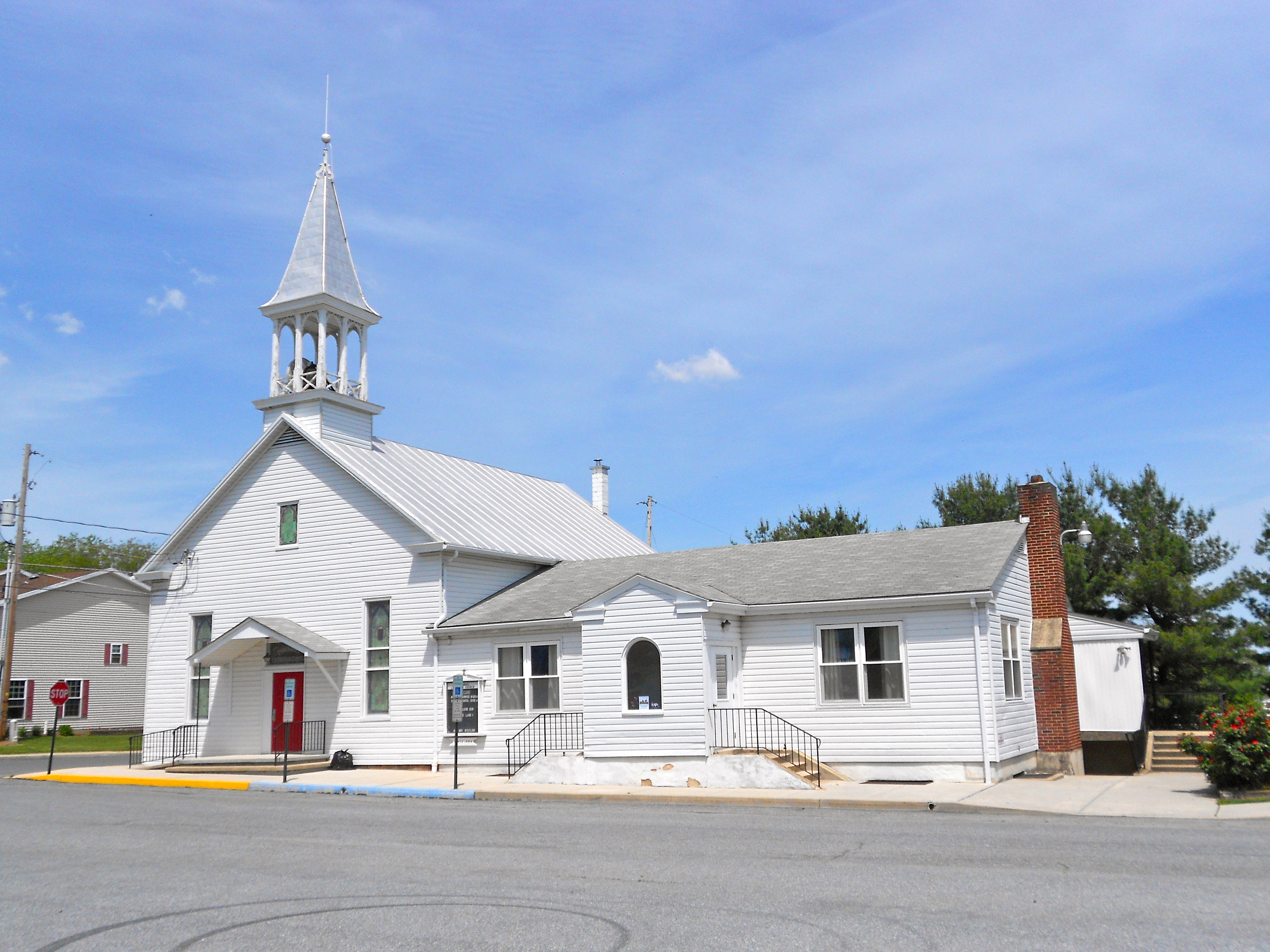
Emmanuel Lutheran Church
