= Germany Township, Pennsylvania =

Township in Pennsylvania, US

Coordinates: 39°45′10″N 77°07′59″W

Germany Township, Adams County, Pennsylvania
- Township
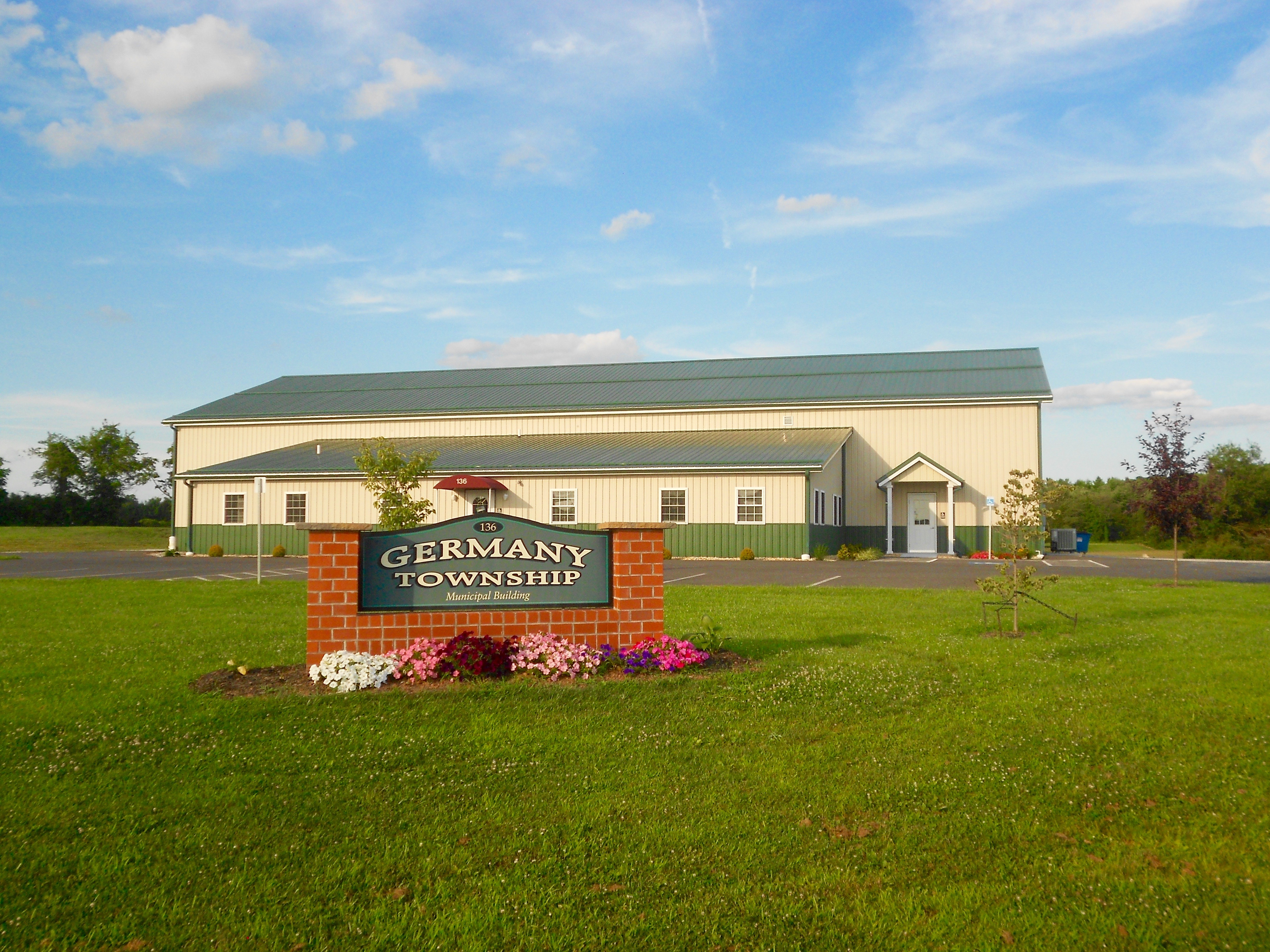
- Municipal building

- Seal

- Location in Adams County and the state of Pennsylvania.
- Country: United States
- State: Pennsylvania
- County: Adams
- Settled: 1733
- Incorporated: Before 1800

Area
  - Total: 10.92 sq mi (28.27 km^{2})
  - Land: 10.90 sq mi (28.23 km^{2})
  - Water: 0.015 sq mi (0.04 km^{2})

Population (2020)
  - Total: 2,845
  - Estimate (2023): 2,889
  - Density: 250.0/sq mi (96.52/km^{2})
- Time zone: UTC-5 (Eastern (EST))
  - Summer (DST): UTC-4 (EDT)
- ZIP code: 17340
- Area code: 717
- FIPS code: 42-001-28936
- Website: www.germanytownship.org

Germany Township is a township in Adams County, Pennsylvania, United States. The population was 2,845 at the 2020 census. The majority of early settlers were from Germany and Great Britain.

== Geography ==
Germany Township is in southern Adams County, along the Maryland border. It borders the western and southern sides of the borough of Littlestown. Pennsylvania Route 97 passes through the township, leading northwest 9 miles (14 km) to Gettysburg and south 12 miles (19 km) as Maryland Route 97 to Westminster. Pennsylvania Route 194 crosses Route 97 in Littlestown and passes through the township, becoming Maryland Route 194 and leading southwest 5 miles (8 km) to Taneytown.

According to the United States Census Bureau, Germany Township has a total area of 10.92 square miles (28.27 km^{2}), of which 10.90 square miles (28.23 km^{2}) is land and 0.015 square miles (0.04 km^{2}), or 0.13%, is water.

== Demographics ==
Historical population
| Census | Pop. | Note | %± |
|---|---|---|---|
| 2000 | 2,269 | | — |
| 2010 | 2,700 | | 19.0% |
| 2020 | 2,845 | | 5.4% |
| 2023 (est.) | 2,889 | | 1.5% |
U.S. Decennial Census

As of the census of 2000, there were 2,269 people, 773 households, and 660 families residing in the township. The population density was 207.8 inhabitants per square mile (80.2/km^{2}). There were 788 housing units at an average density of 72.2 per square mile (27.9/km^{2}). The racial makeup of the township was 98.81% White, 0.18% African American, 0.09% Native American, 0.35% Asian, 0.04% Pacific Islander, 0.09% from other races, and 0.44% from two or more races. Hispanic or Latino of any race were 0.53% of the population.

There were 773 households, out of which 40.6% had children under the age of 18 living with them, 72.4% were married couples living together, 8.0% had a female householder with no husband present, and 14.6% were non-families. 11.9% of all households were made up of individuals, and 6.1% had someone living alone who was 65 years of age or older. The average household size was 2.93 and the average family size was 3.16.

In the township the population was spread out, with 28.3% under the age of 18, 6.7% from 18 to 24, 29.2% from 25 to 44, 24.0% from 45 to 64, and 11.9% who were 65 years of age or older. The median age was 37 years. For every 100 females, there were 98.3 males. For every 100 females age 18 and over, there were 98.9 males.

The median income for a household in the township was $46,806, and the median income for a family was $50,484. Males had a median income of $33,409 versus $24,274 for females. The per capita income for the township was $17,636. About 4.2% of families and 6.5% of the population were below the poverty line, including 8.9% of those under age 18 and 2.5% of those age 65 or over.
