= Union Township, Adams County, Pennsylvania =

Township in Pennsylvania, US

Coordinates: 39°45′10″N 77°02′29″W

- Township
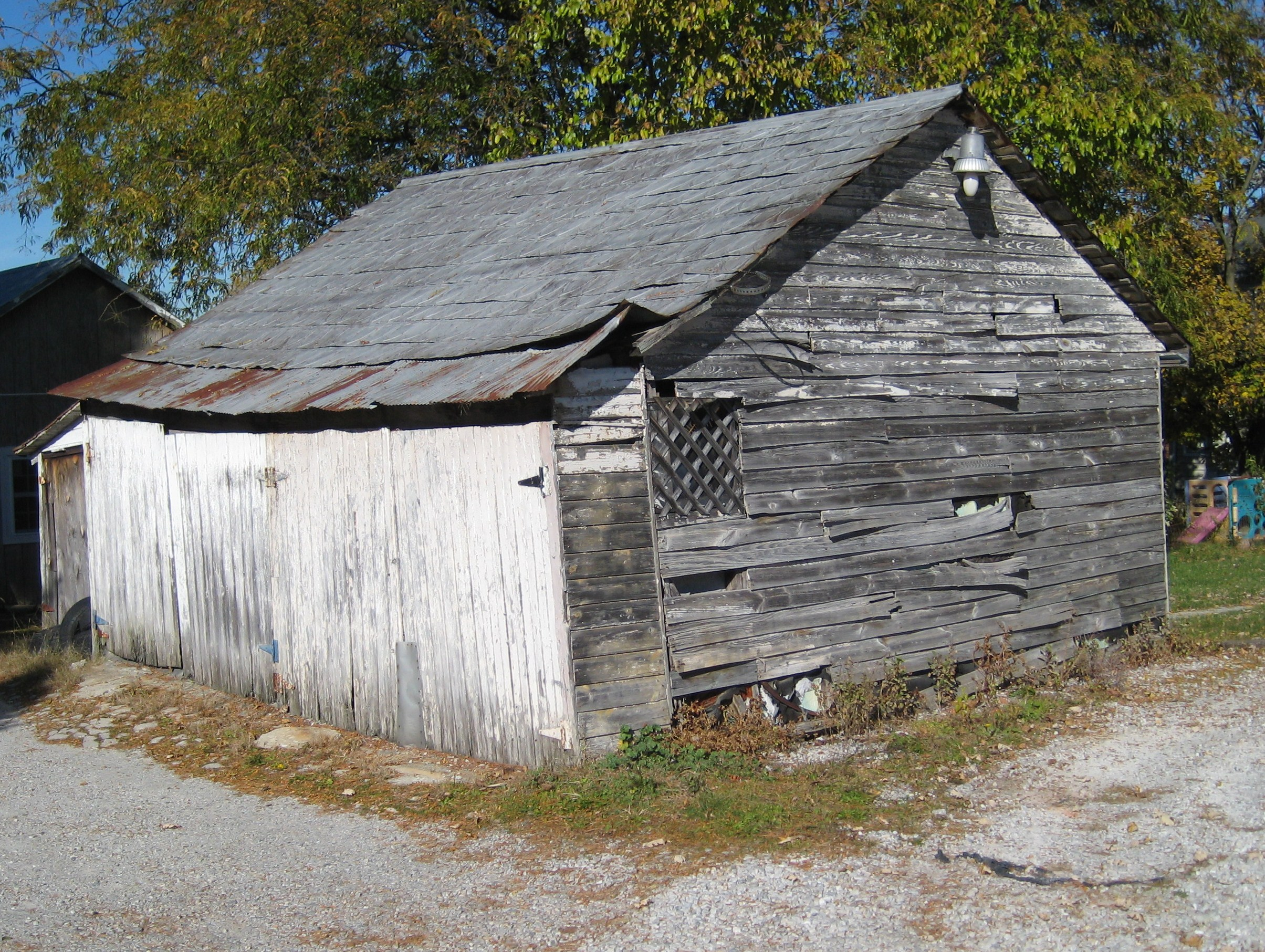
- Garage with a tin roof

- Location in Adams County and the state of Pennsylvania.
- Country: United States
- State: Pennsylvania
- County: Adams
- Settled: 1735
- Incorporated: 1841

Area
  - Total: 17.58 sq mi (45.53 km^{2})
  - Land: 17.54 sq mi (45.44 km^{2})
  - Water: 0.031 sq mi (0.08 km^{2})

Population (2010)
  - Total: 3,148
  - Estimate (2016): 3,182
  - Density: 181.4/sq mi (70.02/km^{2})
- Time zone: UTC-5 (Eastern (EST))
  - Summer (DST): UTC-4 (EDT)
- Area code: 717
- FIPS code: 42-001-78264

Union Township is a township in Adams County, Pennsylvania, United States. The population was 3,148 at the 2010 census.

== Geography ==
Union Township is located in the southeastern corner of Adams County. It is bordered by York County (West Manheim Township) to the east and by Carroll County, Maryland, to the south. Germany Township and the borough of Littlestown border Union Township to the southwest. Mount Pleasant Township is to the northwest and Conewago Township is to the northeast.

According to the United States Census Bureau, the township has a total area of 17.6 square miles (45.5 km^{2}), of which 17.5 square miles (45.4 km^{2}) is land and 0.039 square miles (0.1 km^{2}), or 0.18%, is water.

== Demographics ==
Historical population
Census	Pop.	Note	%±
2000	2,989		—
2010	3,148		5.3%
2016 (est.)	3,182		1.1%
U.S. Decennial Census

According to the census of 2000, there were 2,989 people, 1,074 households, and 891 families residing in the township. The population density was 171.2 inhabitants per square mile (66.1/km^{2}). There were 1,112 housing units at an average density of 63.7 per square mile (24.6/km^{2}). The racial makeup of the township was 98.33% White, 0.07% African American, 0.23% Native American, 0.67% Asian, 0.13% of other races, and 0.57% of two or more races. Hispanic or Latino of any race was 0.84% of the population.

There were 1,074 households, out of which 37.5% had children under the age of 18 living with them, 73.7% were married couples living together, 6.6% had a female householder with no husband present, and 17.0% were non-families. 13.3% of all households were made up of individuals, and 5.1% had someone living alone who was 65 years of age or older. The average household size was 2.78 and the average family size was 3.02.

In the township the population was distributed, with 27.2% under the age of 18, 5.2% from 18 to 24, 29.3% from 25 to 44, 25.5% from 45 to 64, and 12.8% who were 65 years of age or older. The median age was 39 years. For every 100 females, there were 97.6 males. For every 100 females aged 18 and over, there were 97.8 males.

The median income for a household in the township was $47,619, and the median income for a family was $51,845. Males had a median income of $37,727 versus $24,028 for females. The per capita income for the township was $19,506. About 2.0% of families and 2.9% of the population were below the poverty line, including 4.6% of those under the age of 18 and 0.8% of those aged 65 or over.

== Environmental issues ==
Keystone Sanitation Landfill is located on a ridge of 40 acres of former farmland. From 1966 until 1990, it accepted municipal and industrial waste and construction debris. The site leached volatile organic compounds and heavy metals, and runoff went in all directions into the groundwater and surface water, affecting 2,300 people living in a three-mile radius. EPA added the landfill to the Superfund list in July 1987. From 1990-1997, cleanup consisted of extraction and treatment of on-site groundwater, installation of an impermeable cap, a landfill gas collection system, construction of a fence, and water monitoring. In 1999, 34 residences in proximity received whole-house treatment units, and groundwater was also extracted off-site. In May 2003, a landfill gas extraction system was added. However, due to low flow rates, 14 additional landfill gas wells were installed in November 2010.

In September 1993, EPA tried to recover approximately $1.4 million of clean up costs in litigation, which as of 2015 was still stayed, pending court-ordered settlement negotiations. The three owners of the landfill, Waste Management Inc., the Keystone Sanitation Company, and Anna and Kenneth Noel, refused to participate in cleanup and in 2000, the EPA fined them $250,000.
