= Berwick Township, Pennsylvania =

Township in Pennsylvania, US

Coordinates: 39°53′00″N 76°58′59″W

- Township
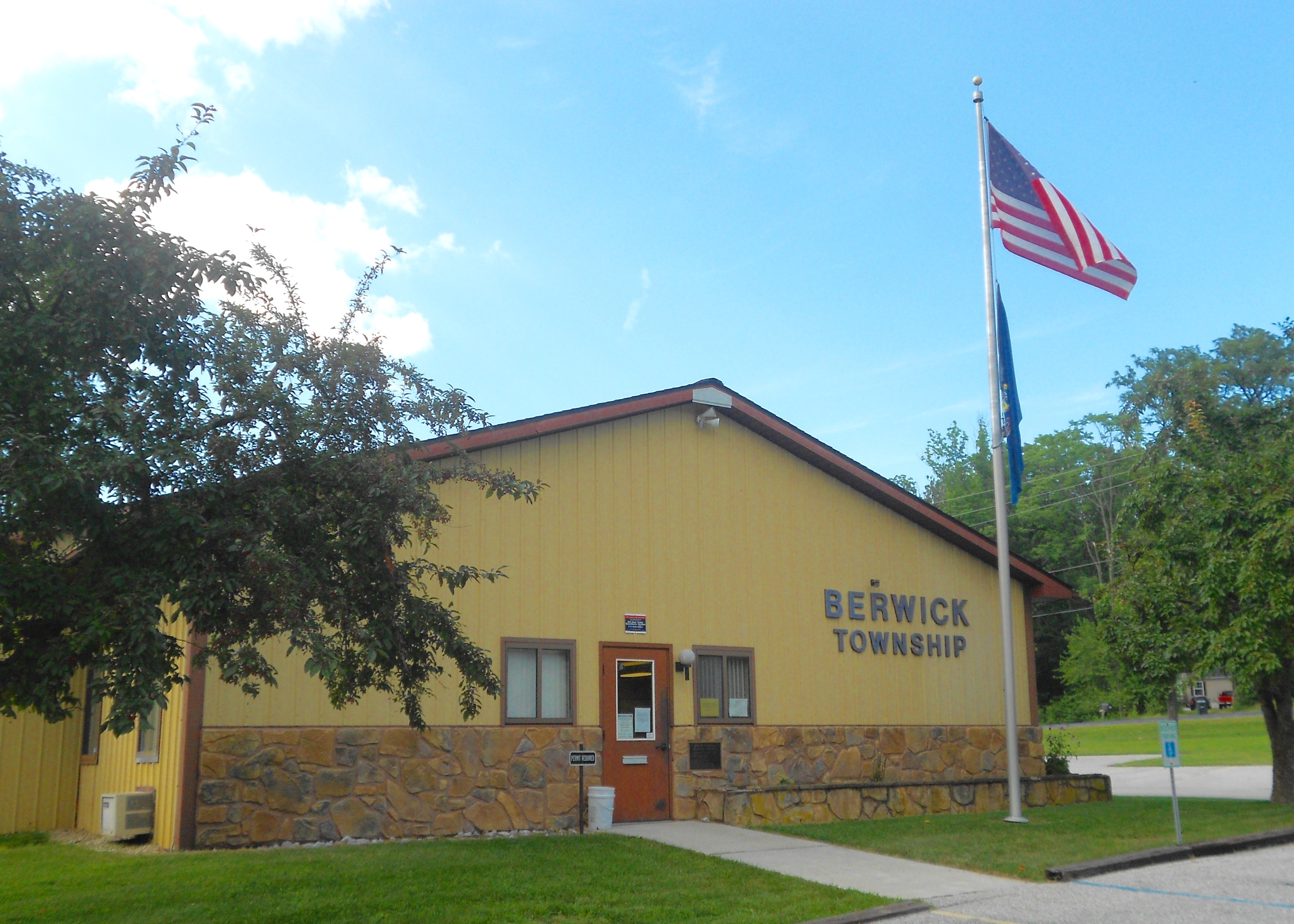
- Township office

- Seal

- Location in Adams County and the state of Pennsylvania.
- Country: United States
- State: Pennsylvania
- County: Adams
- Settled: 1749
- Incorporated: 1800

Area
  - Total: 7.76 sq mi (20.09 km^{2})
  - Land: 7.73 sq mi (20.03 km^{2})
  - Water: 0.023 sq mi (0.06 km^{2})

Population (2020)
  - Total: 2,400
  - Estimate (2023): 2,441
  - Density: 309.7/sq mi (119.56/km^{2})
- Time zone: UTC-5 (Eastern (EST))
  - Summer (DST): UTC-4 (EDT)
- Area code: 717
- FIPS code: 42-001-05880
- Website: www.berwicktownship.com

Berwick Township is a township in Adams County, Pennsylvania, United States. The population was 2,400 at the 2020 census. Berwick Township is one of 21 townships in Adams County.

== Geography ==
According to the U.S. Census Bureau, the township has a total area of 7.7 square miles (20 km^{2}), all land.

== Demographics ==
Historical population
| Census | Pop. | Note | %± |
|---|---|---|---|
| 2000 | 1,818 | | — |
| 2010 | 2,389 | | 31.4% |
| 2020 | 2,400 | | 0.5% |
| 2023 (est.) | 2,441 | | 1.7% |
U.S. Decennial Census

As of the census of 2000, there were 1,818 people, 677 households, and 513 families residing in the township. The population density was 235.6 inhabitants per square mile (91.0/km^{2}). There were 715 housing units at an average density of 92.7 per square mile (35.8/km^{2}). The racial makeup of the township was 98.40% White, 0.28% African American, 0.44% Asian, 0.06% Pacific Islander, 0.72% from other races, and 0.11% from two or more races. Hispanic or Latino of any race were 2.15% of the population.

There were 677 households, out of which 31.8% had children under the age of 18 living with them, 65.9% were married couples living together, 6.1% had a female householder with no husband present, and 24.2% were non-families. 18.8% of all households were made up of individuals, and 7.5% had someone living alone who was 65 years of age or older. The average household size was 2.59 and the average family size was 2.95.

In the township, the population was spread out, with 23.0% under the age of 18, 7.4% from 18 to 24, 30.1% from 25 to 44, 27.8% from 45 to 64, and 11.7% who were 65 years of age or older. The median age was 39 years. For every 100 females, there were 102.7 males. For every 100 females age 18 and over, there were 100.0 males.

The median income for a household in the township was $46,164, and the median income for a family was $50,060. Males had a median income of $36,154 versus $23,958 for females. The per capita income for the township was $22,573. About 4.2% of families and 4.7% of the population were below the poverty line, including 5.3% of those under age 18 and 11.7% of those age 65 or over.
