= Abbottstown, Pennsylvania =

Borough in Pennsylvania, United States

- Borough
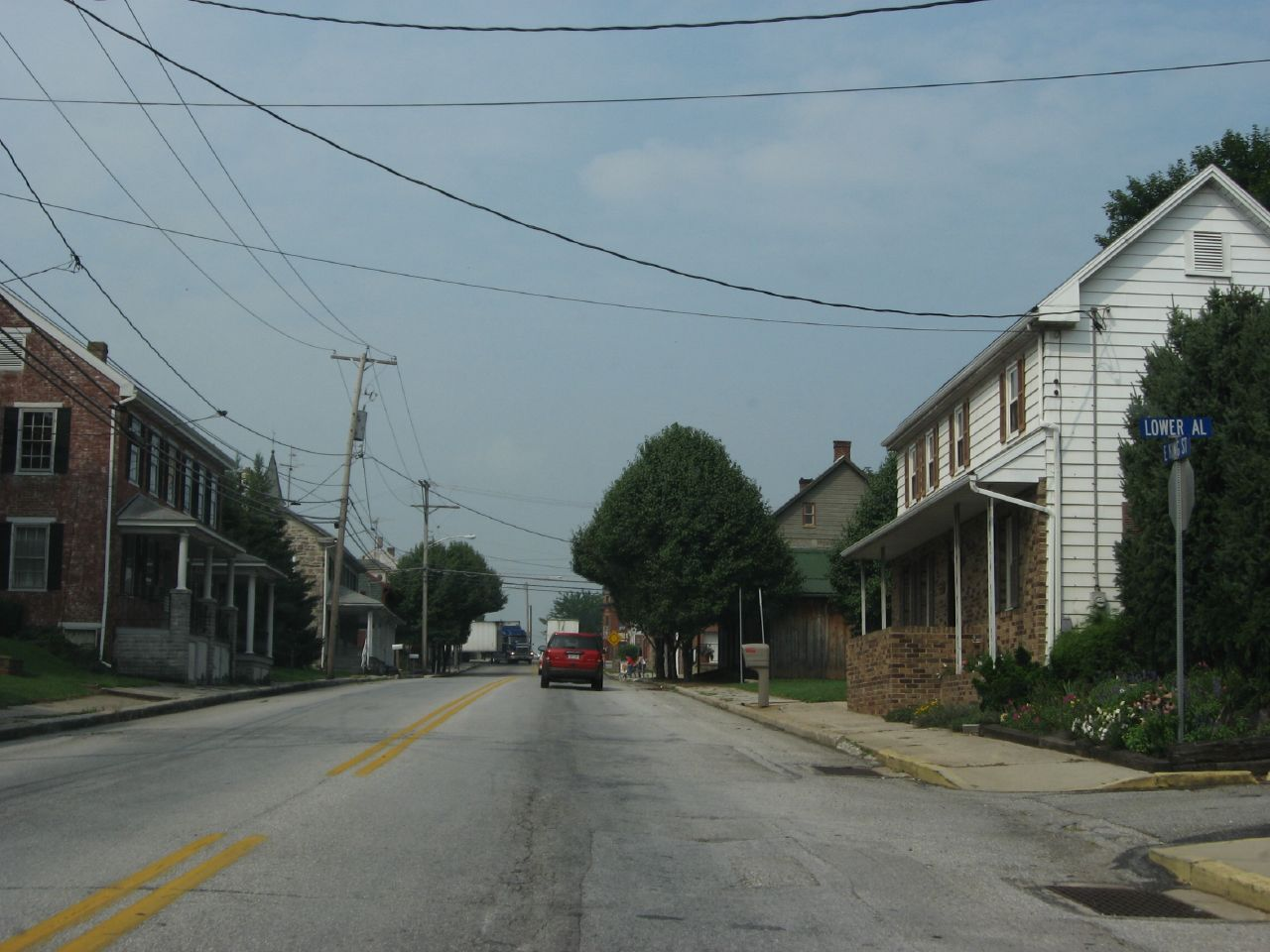
- U.S. Route 30 in Abbottstown

- Seal

- Location in Adams County and the U.S. state of Pennsylvania.

- Location in Pennsylvania and the United States Abbottstown (the United States) Abbottstown (North America)
- Coordinates: 39°53′08″N 76°59′10″W
- Country: United States
- State: Pennsylvania
- County: Adams
- Settled: 1753
- Incorporated: 1835

Government
  - Type: Borough Council

Area
  - Total: 0.55 sq mi (1.43 km^{2})
  - Land: 0.54 sq mi (1.41 km^{2})
  - Water: 0.0077 sq mi (0.02 km^{2})
- Elevation: 564 ft (172 m)

Population (2020)
  - Total: 1,022
  - Density: 1,871.8/sq mi (722.71/km^{2})
- Time zone: UTC-5 (Eastern (EST))
  - Summer (DST): UTC-4 (EDT)
- Zip Code: 17301
- Area code: 717
- FIPS code: 42-00116
- Website: abbottstown.adamscountypa.gov

Abbottstown is a borough in Adams County, Pennsylvania, United States. The population was 1,022 at the 2020 census.

== History ==
Abbottstown is named for John Abbott, who founded it in 1753. The John Abbott House was added to the National Register of Historic Places in 1980. The town had rail service via the East Berlin Railroad from 1877 to 1914 and 1916 to 1939. The tracks were removed in 1940.

In 1950, Abbottstown had a population of 538.

== Geography ==
Abbottstown is located at 39°53′8″N 76°59′10″W (39.885621, -76.986120). According to the U.S. Census Bureau, the borough has a total area of 0.6 square miles (1.6 km^{2}), all land.

== Demographics ==
Historical population
Census	Pop.	Note	%±
1850	334		—
1870	325		—
1880	368		13.2%
1890	381		3.5%
1900	345		−9.4%
1910	332		−3.8%
1920	334		0.6%
1930	457		36.8%
1940	441		−3.5%
1950	538		22.0%
1960	561		4.3%
1970	552		−1.6%
1980	558		1.1%
1990	539		−3.4%
2000	905		67.9%
2010	1,011		11.7%
2020	1,022		1.1%

As of the census of 2000, there were 905 people, 323 households, and 254 families residing in the borough. The population density was 1,592.2 inhabitants per square mile (614.8/km^{2}). There were 346 housing units at an average density of 608.7 units per square mile (235.0 units/km^{2}). The racial makeup of the borough was 95.25% White, 0.22% African American, 0.11% Native American, 0.11% Pacific Islander, 3.87% from other races, and 0.44% from two or more races. Hispanic or Latino of any race were 5.52% of the population.

There were 323 households, out of which 43.7% had children under the age of 18 living with them, 64.4% were married couples living together, 10.2% had a female householder with no husband present, and 21.1% were non-families. 15.5% of all households were made up of individuals, and 6.8% had someone living alone who was 65 years of age or older. The average household size was 2.80 and the average family size was 3.15.

In the borough the age distribution is 29.5% under the age of 18, 7.6% from 18 to 24, 36.4% from 25 to 44, 18.7% from 45 to 64, and 7.8% who were 65 years of age or older. The median age was 32 years. For every 100 females there were 92.1 males. For every 100 females age 18 and over, there were 91.6 males.

The median income for a household in the borough was $49,063, and the median income for a family was $52,578. Males had a median income of $31,736 versus $24,083 for females. The per capita income for the borough was $17,246. About 1.6% of families and 2.4% of the population were below the poverty line, including 0.8% of those under age 18 and 1.7% of those age 65 or over.

In 2010 Abbottstown had a population of 1,011. The racial and ethnic composition of the population was 88.4% non-Hispanic white, 1.4% black or African American, 0.1% Native American, 1.0% Asian, 1.2% reporting two or more races and 9.4% Hispanic or Latino.

== Education ==
It is in the Conewago Valley School District.

== Notable person ==
- Henry Louis Baugher, born in Abbottstown, Lutheran preacher, and president of Gettysburg College
