= Penn Township, York County, Pennsylvania =

Township in Pennsylvania, US

Coordinates: 39°47′50″N 76°57′29″W

- Township
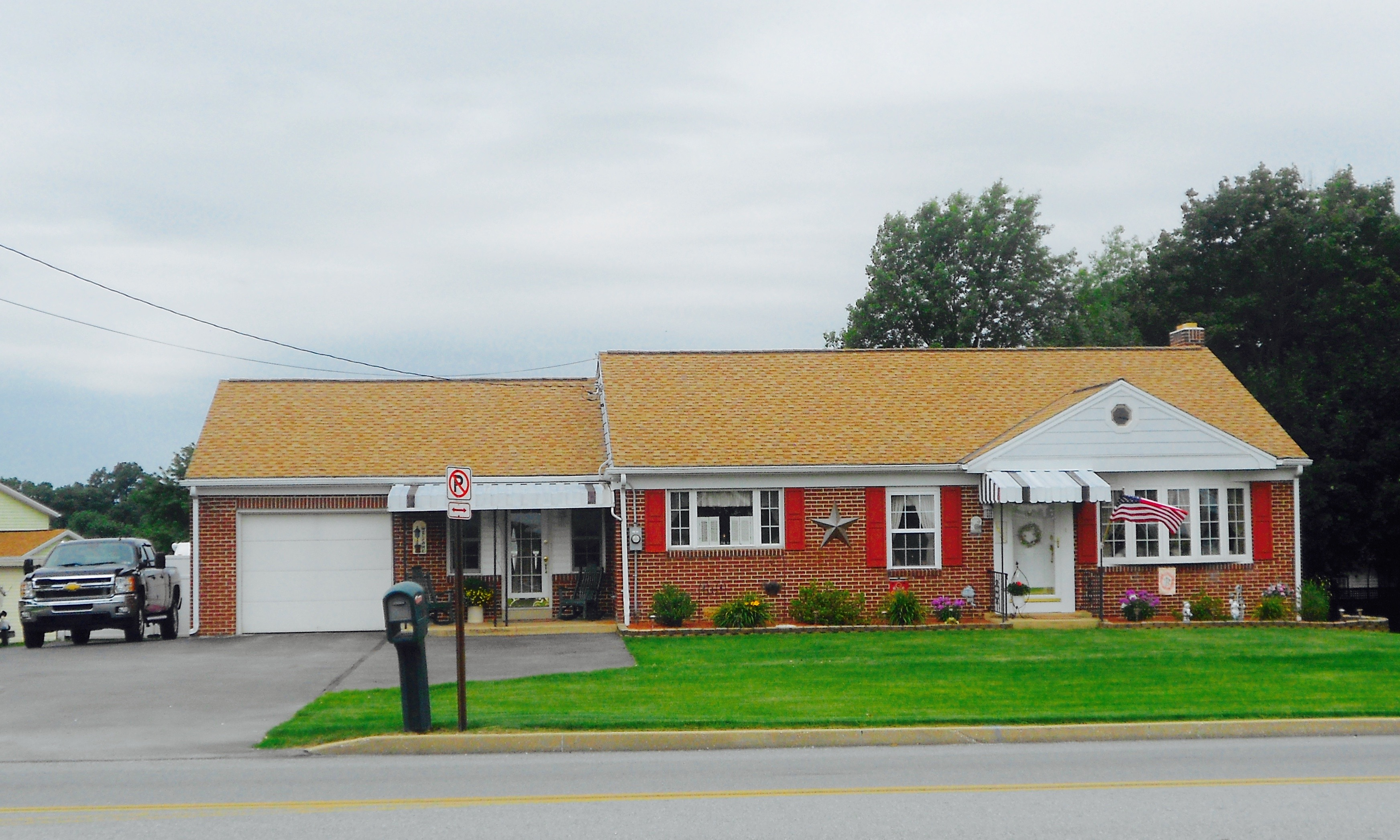
- House south of Hanover

- Location in York County and the state of Pennsylvania.
- Country: United States
- State: Pennsylvania
- County: York
- Settled: 1825
- Incorporated: 1880

Government
  - Type: Board of Supervisors

Area
  - Total: 13.14 sq mi (34.03 km^{2})
  - Land: 12.98 sq mi (33.61 km^{2})
  - Water: 0.16 sq mi (0.42 km^{2})

Population (2020)
  - Total: 17,474 ▲
  - Estimate (2023): 18,185
  - Density: 1,254.8/sq mi (484.47/km^{2})
- Time zone: UTC-5 (Eastern (EST))
  - Summer (DST): UTC-4 (EDT)
- Area code: 717
- FIPS code: 42-133-58888
- Website: Penn Township official website

Historical population
Census	Pop.	Note	%±
1930	3,729		—
1940	4,299		15.3%
1950	5,263		22.4%
1960	7,063		34.2%
1970	8,154		15.4%
1980	9,234		13.2%
1990	11,658		26.3%
2000	14,592		25.2%
2010	15,612		7.0%
2020	17,474		11.9%
2023 (est.)	18,185		4.1%
U.S. Decennial Census

Penn Township is a township in York County, Pennsylvania, United States. The population was 17,474 at the 2020 census.

== Geography ==
According to the United States Census Bureau, the township has a total area of 12.9 square miles (33 km^{2}), of which 12.8 square miles (33 km^{2}) is land and 0.2 square miles (0.52 km^{2}), or 1.16%, is water. The township encircles the borough of Hanover on three sides, with the York County-Adams County boundary forming the western border of both the township and the borough. It also contains the census-designated places of Parkville and Pennville.

== Demographics ==
At the 2000 census there were 14,592 people, 5,421 households, and 4,103 families living in the township. The population density was 1,144.2 inhabitants per square mile (441.8/km^{2}). There were 5,643 housing units at an average density of 442.5 per square mile (170.9/km^{2}). The racial makeup of the township was 97.46% White, 0.49% African American, 0.17% Native American, 0.82% Asian, 0.02% Pacific Islander, 0.47% from other races, and 0.58% from two or more races. Hispanic or Latino of any race were 1.05%.

Of the 5,421 households 36.1% had children under the age of 18 living with them, 63.2% were married couples living together, 8.4% had a female householder with no husband present, and 24.3% were non-families. 19.7% of households were one person and 7.4% were one person aged 65 or older. The average household size was 2.63 and the average family size was 3.02.

The age distribution was 25.9% under the age of 18, 6.4% from 18 to 24, 30.7% from 25 to 44, 22.4% from 45 to 64, and 14.6% 65 or older. The median age was 38 years. For every 100 females, there were 95.9 males. For every 100 females age 18 and over, there were 92.6 males.

The median household income was $47,876 and the median family income was $53,544. Males had a median income of $38,415 versus $24,024 for females. The per capita income for the township was $19,833. About 2.3% of families and 3.6% of the population were below the poverty line, including 3.8% of those under age 18 and 4.7% of those age 65 or over.
