= Pennsylvania Route 34 =

State highway in Pennsylvania, US

Pennsylvania Route 34

Route information
- Maintained by PennDOT
- Length: 62.289 mi (100.244 km)

Major junctions
- South end: US 15 Bus. in Gettysburg
- PA 234 in Biglerville; PA 94 in Mount Holly Springs; PA 174 near Mount Holly Springs; I-81 in Carlisle; US 11 / PA 74 / PA 641 in Carlisle; PA 944 in Carlisle Springs; PA 850 near Shermans Dale; PA 274 in New Bloomfield; PA 849 in Newport; US 22 / US 322 near Newport
- North end: US 11 / US 15 near Liverpool

Location
- Country: United States
- State: Pennsylvania
- Counties: Adams, Cumberland, Perry

Highway system
- Pennsylvania State Route System; Interstate; US; State; Scenic; Legislative
← PA 33	→ PA 35

Pennsylvania Route 34 (PA 34) is a 62-mile-long (100 km) state route located in southern Pennsylvania. The southern terminus of the route is at U.S. Route 15 Business (US 15 Bus.) in Gettysburg. The northern terminus is at US 11/US 15 south of Liverpool. PA 34 heads north from Gettysburg through farmland in northern Adams County, passing through Biglerville. The route crosses South Mountain into Cumberland County and reaches Mount Holly Springs, where it intersects PA 94. PA 34 heads north into the agricultural Cumberland Valley and heads north to Carlisle, where it has an interchange with Interstate 81 (I-81) in the southern part of town and intersects US 11/PA 74/PA 641 in the downtown area. The route continues north through more rural land and crosses Blue Mountain into Perry County, where it continues through the Ridge-and-Valley Appalachians, winding north to New Bloomfield. From here, PA 34 continues northeast to Newport, where it crosses the Juniata River and reaches an interchange with US 22/US 322, before heading to its terminus at US 11/US 15 near the Susquehanna River.

The section of the route between Mount Holly Springs and Carlisle became a turnpike called the Hanover and Carlisle Turnpike in 1812, which connected Carlisle to Hanover and served as a trade link between the Cumberland Valley and Baltimore. PA 34 was designated in 1928 to run from US 15 (now US 15 Bus.) in Gettysburg north to US 11 in Carlisle. The same year, the road between Carlisle and Mecks Corner was designated PA 33 while the road between Mecks Corner and Newport became part of PA 5. PA 34 was extended north from Carlisle to US 22 (Juniata Parkway) east of Newport in 1937, replacing those sections of PA 33 and PA 5. For a short time in the 1960s, PA 34 extended south from Gettysburg to US 15 in Fairplay along a former alignment of US 15 before being replaced by US 15 Bus. In 1970, the route was extended north from Newport to US 11/US 15 south of Liverpool.

== Route description ==
=== Adams County ===
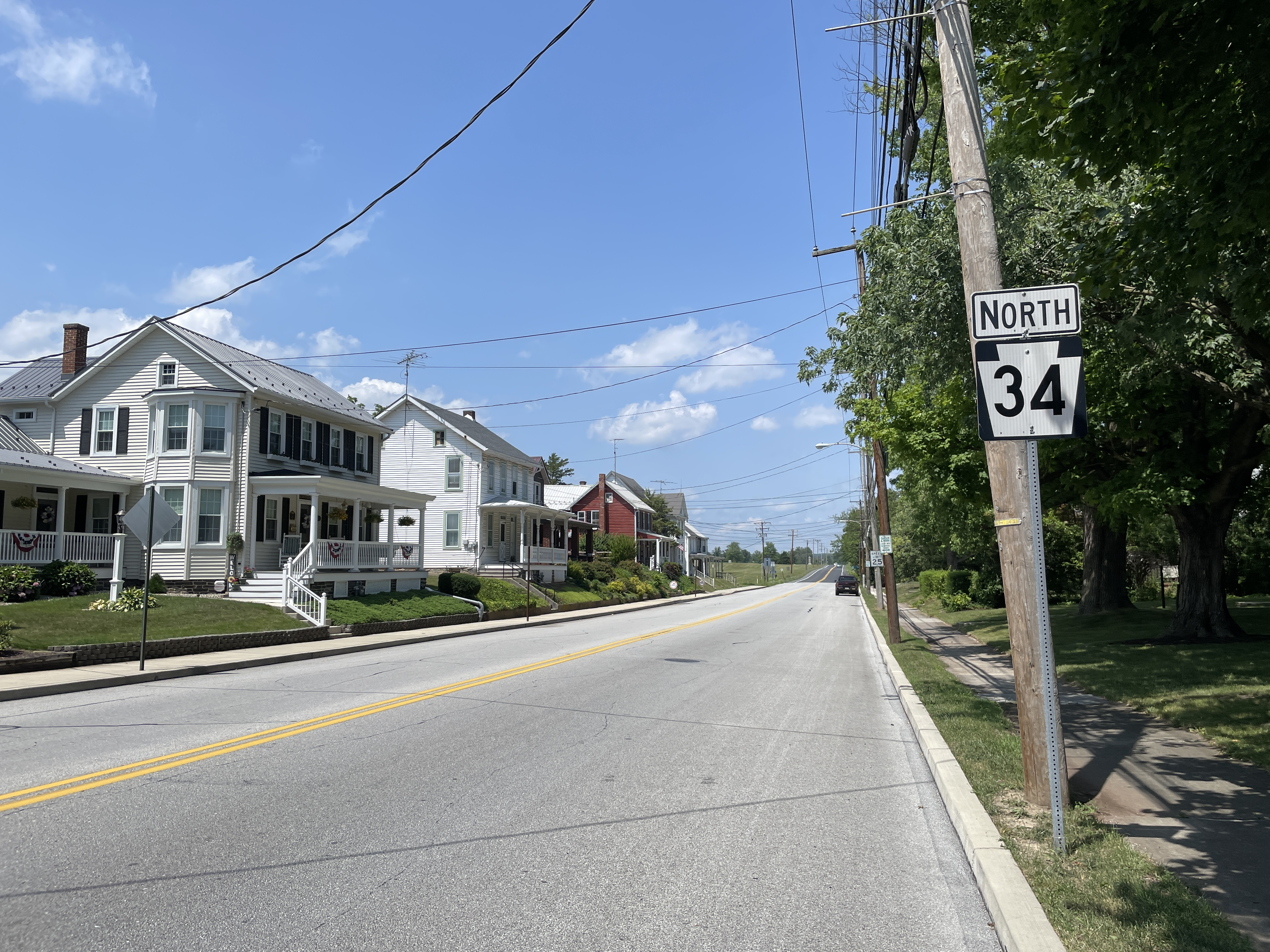
PA 34 northbound in Gettysburg

PA 34 begins at an intersection with US 15 Bus. in the borough of Gettysburg in Adams County, with the road continuing south as part of US 15 Bus. toward the downtown area. From here, the route heads north on two-lane undivided Carlisle Street past homes. PA 34 crosses into Cumberland Township and becomes Biglerville Road, passing through fields within Gettysburg National Military Park. After leaving the park boundaries, the road heads through rural areas with residential and commercial development. The route heads into Butler Township and crosses the Gettysburg and Northern Railroad as it passes through a mix of farms and woods with some homes. PA 34 runs through more rural areas with occasional development before crossing into the borough of Biglerville and becoming South Main Street, passing residences and a few businesses as it intersects PA 394. The route continues into the downtown area and comes to a junction with PA 234. Here, the road becomes North Main Street and passes more homes before heading back into Butler Township.

At this point, PA 34 becomes Carlisle Road and comes into open farmland with occasional residences. The route enters Menallen Township and runs through Floradale prior to curving to the northeast through more agricultural areas with some patches of woods and homes. The road passes through a small corner of the borough of Bendersville before heading through more rural areas of Menallen Township. PA 34 heads into Tyrone Township and passes under the Gettysburg and Northern Railroad before making a turn to the north. The route crosses the Bermudian Creek into Huntington Township and runs through Idaville before heading through more areas of farms, woods, and residences.

=== Cumberland County ===
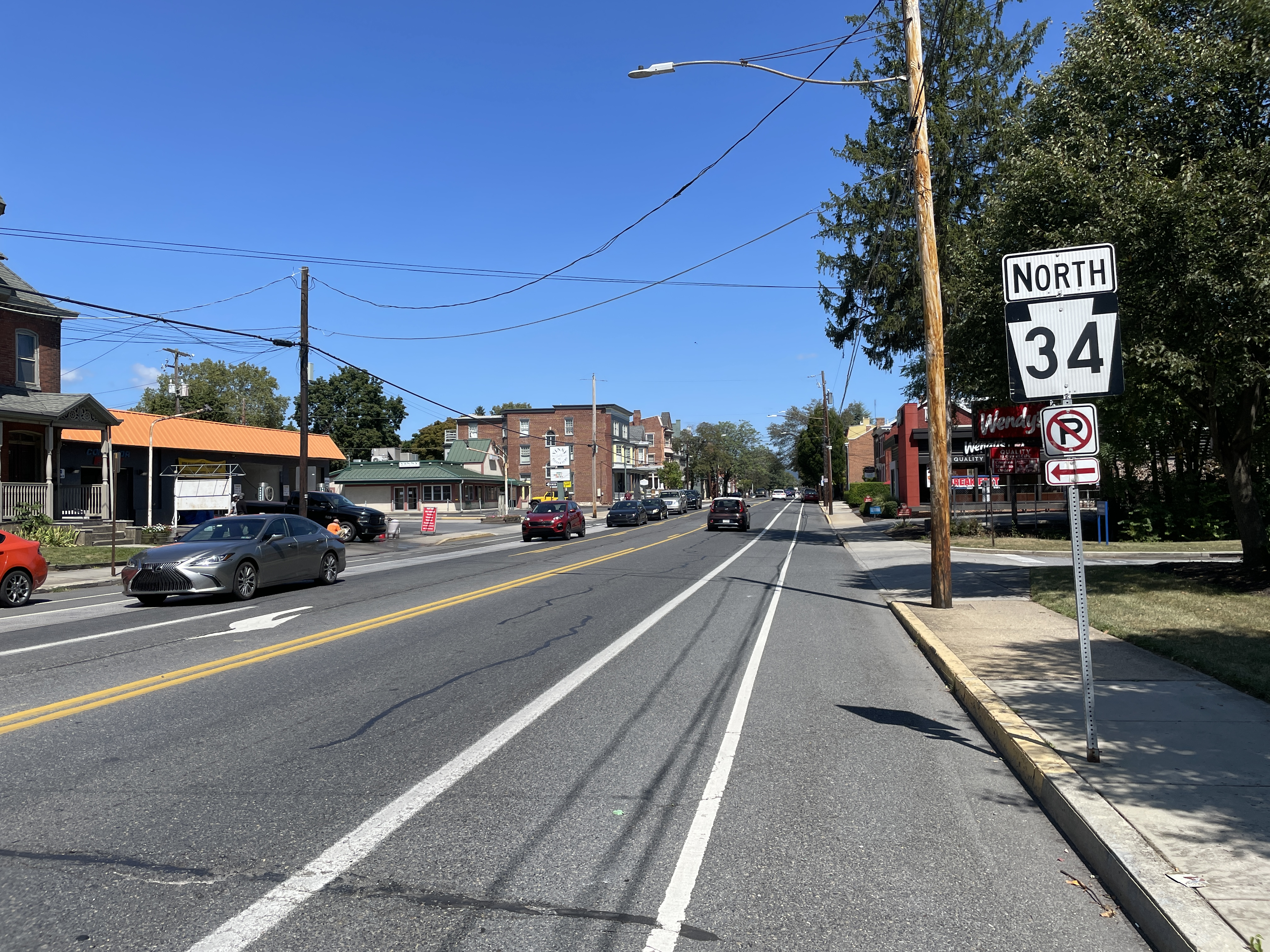
PA 34 northbound in Carlisle

PA 34 crosses into Dickinson Township in Cumberland County and runs through more agricultural areas with some homes, passing through Goodyear. The road continues north and passes through Hunters Run before entering South Middleton Township, where it crosses the Appalachian Trail and traverses forested South Mountain, running a short distance to the east of the Gettysburg and Northern Railroad as it heads northeast. The route heads into the borough of Mount Holly Springs and becomes Yates Street, running through wooded areas of homes before intersecting the northern terminus of PA 94. At this point, PA 34 turns north onto South Baltimore Avenue and turns northwest, crossing the Gettysburg and Northern Railroad before passing through more forests. The road heads into residential and commercial areas, turning north to become North Baltimore Avenue. The route passes under Norfolk Southern's Lurgan Branch before crossing back into South Middleton Township and becoming Holly Pike, passing a few residential subdivisions before heading into a mix of farmland and woodland with a few homes. PA 34 crosses PA 174 and runs through more agricultural areas with some residential and commercial development. Development increases as the road passes through Bonny Brook and becomes the border between the borough of Carlisle to the west and South Middleton Township to the east a short distance later, becoming South Hanover Street. The route widens into a four-lane divided highway and fully enters Carlisle as it interchanges with I-81 in a commercial area.

Past this interchange, PA 34 becomes a four-lane undivided road and passes several homes. The route heads into the commercial downtown of Carlisle and comes to an intersection with US 11/PA 74/PA 641 adjacent to the Cumberland County Courthouse. At this point, US 11 turns north to join PA 34 in a concurrency on North Hanover Street, narrowing to two lanes and turning northeast past more homes and businesses. At a crossing of Norfolk Southern's Shippensburg Secondary, PA 34 splits from US 11 by turning north onto Carlisle Springs Road and passes through industrial areas before running past residential neighborhoods, heading to the west of the Carlisle Fairgrounds. The route crosses into North Middleton Township and passes under I-76 (Pennsylvania Turnpike), becoming Spring Road and curving northeast past a few businesses. The road turns to the north again and runs through residential areas with a few businesses, crossing the Conodoguinet Creek and turning northeast past more development. PA 34 heads into Middlesex Township and runs through more rural areas of homes, coming to an intersection with PA 944. At this point, PA 944 joins PA 34, passing through the community of Carlisle Springs, where PA 944 turns to the east. PA 34 runs northeast through open farmland before entering wooded areas of homes, at which point the route ascends forested Blue Mountain. At the summit of the mountain, the route passes through Sterretts Gap and comes to a roundabout with Sunnyside Drive and Mountain Road, where it turns northwest.

=== Perry County ===
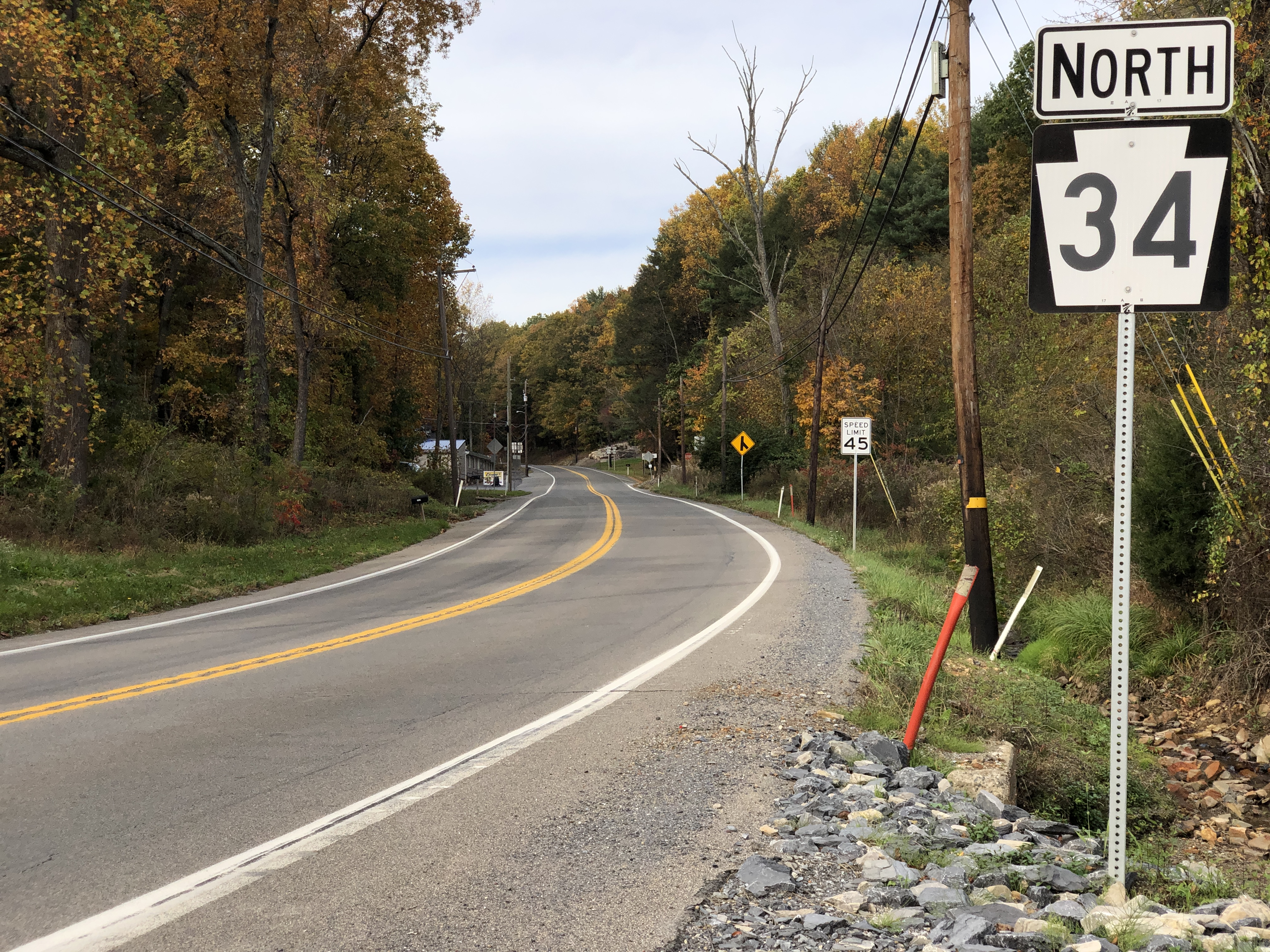
PA 34 northbound approaching PA 274 in Mecks Corner

PA 34 heads into Carroll Township in Perry County, where it descends Blue Mountain and passes a few homes. The road turns north and crosses Little Mountain before coming into a mix of farms and woods with some residential and commercial development. The route curves to the northwest and reaches a roundabout with PA 850 in Shermans Dale. At this junction, PA 850 turns northwest to join PA 34, and the road continues past a few businesses before crossing Shermans Creek and passing a mix of farmland and residences as it runs to the east of the creek. The road continues through more farm fields and woods with homes and reaches the community of Dromgold, where PA 850 splits to the west and PA 34 turns to the northeast. The road runs through the community of Crums Corners before coming to a junction with PA 274 in Mecks Corner. Here, PA 34 turns northwest to join PA 274, becoming the border between Carroll Township to the west and Wheatfield Township to the east, heading through forests before continuing into agricultural areas with a few homes. The road heads into Centre Township and winds northwest through farms, woods, and residences before coming into the borough of New Bloomfield. PA 34/PA 274 turns north onto South Carlisle Street and passes homes before coming to a traffic circle in the center of town adjacent to the Perry County Courthouse. At this point, PA 274 splits to the west and PA 34 turns east onto East Main Street, running past more residences.

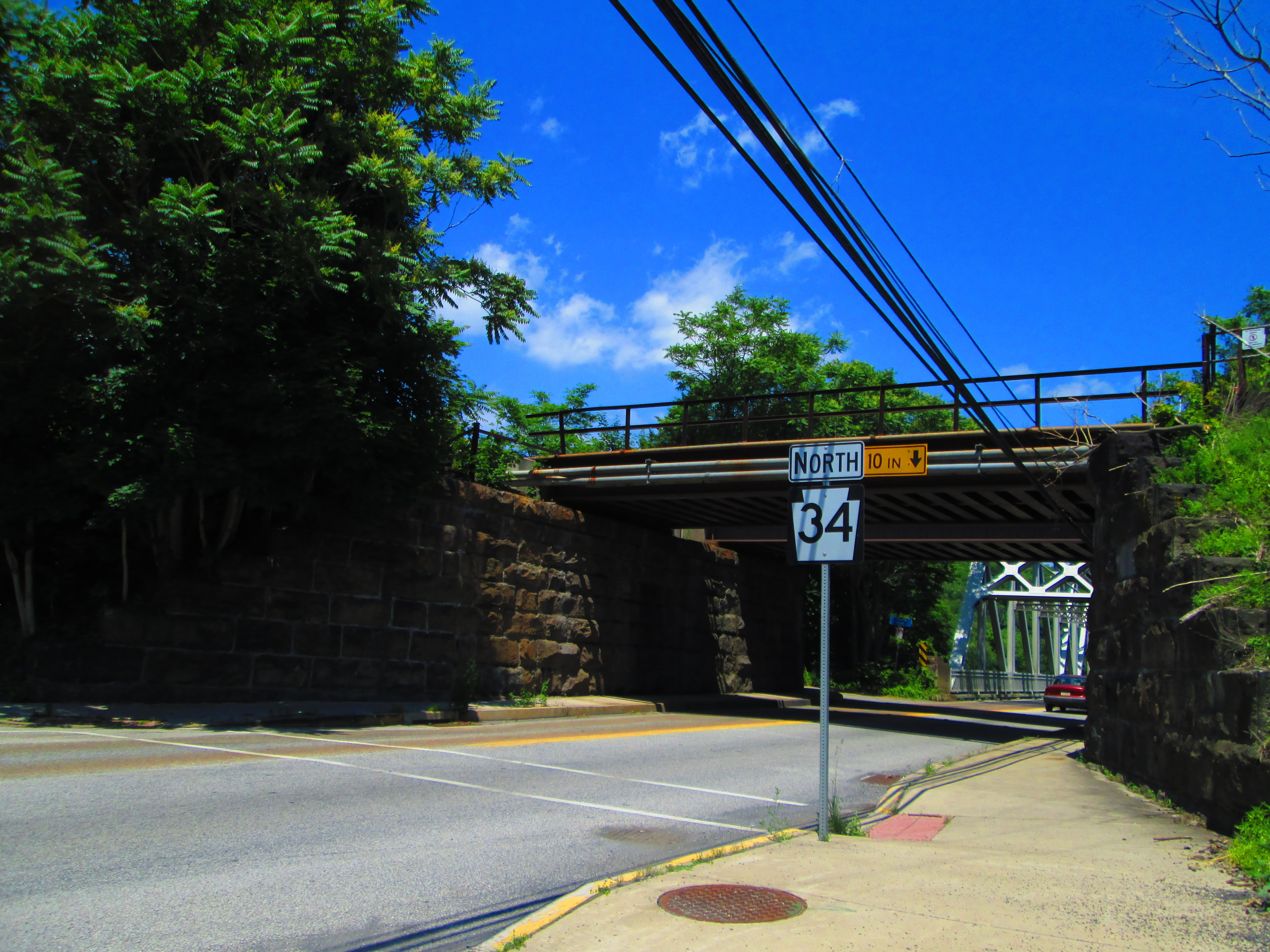
PA 34 northbound through the borough of Newport

The route turns northeast and heads back into Centre Township, becoming Keystone Way and passes through agricultural areas with some homes. The road heads into a mix of farmland, woodland, and residences as it winds northeast and enters Oliver Township. Here, PA 34 curves north across forested Limestone Ridge prior to heading northeast again and passing through farmland and woodland with some homes and businesses. The route runs through Buffalo Bridge and reaches an intersection with PA 849. Here, PA 849 turns north to join PA 34, heading through more rural areas before crossing into the borough of Newport. The two routes turn northwest onto South 4th Street, passing homes. PA 34 splits from PA 849 by turning northeast onto Market Street and passing through the commercial downtown. The route passes under Norfolk Southern's Pittsburgh Line prior to crossing the Juniata River into Howe Township. At this point, the road becomes Red Hill Road and runs through agricultural and wooded areas with some development. PA 34 comes to an interchange with the US 22/US 322 freeway, with a park and ride lot located northeast of the interchange, and continues through more farmland with some homes. The route turns north to cross forested Berry Mountain and curves east-northeast to run through forests in between Buffalo Mountain to the north and Berry Mountain to the south, heading into Buffalo Township and becoming Hunters Valley Road. Farther east, the road heads through a mix of farmland and woodland with some homes. PA 34 curves south and then east to reach its northern terminus at US 11/US 15 just west of the Millersburg Ferry across the Susquehanna River.

== History ==
The section of current PA 34 between Mount Holly Springs and Carlisle was chartered as part of a private turnpike known as the Hanover and Carlisle Turnpike in 1812, connecting Hanover with Carlisle. This turnpike provided an improved trade link between the Cumberland Valley and Baltimore. When Pennsylvania first legislated routes in 1911, what is now PA 34 was designated as Legislative Route 41 between Gettysburg and Carlisle, Legislative Route 40 between Carlisle and New Bloomfield, and as part of Legislative Route 31 between New Bloomfield and Newport. PA 34 was designated in 1928 to run from US 15 (now US 15 Bus.) in Gettysburg north to US 11 in Carlisle along a paved road. The same year, the road between US 11 in Carlisle and PA 5 (now PA 274) Mecks Corner was designated as PA 33 while the road between Mecks Corner and US 22 (Juniata Parkway) east of Newport was designated as part of PA 5; the entire length of the road between Carlisle and Newport was paved. By 1930, Red Hill Road/Hunters Valley Road between Newport and US 11 south of Liverpool was an unnumbered unpaved road. In 1937, PA 34 was extended north from Carlisle to US 22 east of Newport, replacing the PA 33 designation between Carlisle and Mecks Corner and the PA 5 designation between Mecks Corner and Newport. In addition, Red Hill Road was paved between Newport and Bucks Valley Road. By 1941, Hunters Valley Road was paved between Cherry Road and US 11/US 15. The remainder of Red Hill Road/Hunters Valley Road was paved by 1960. In 1963, PA 34 was extended south from Gettysburg to US 15 near Fairplay, following the former alignment of US 15 after that route was moved to a bypass of Gettysburg. By 1966, the south end of the route reverted to its current location at US 15 Bus., with US 15 Bus. replacing the route to the south of Gettysburg. PA 34 was extended north from Newport to US 11/US 15 south of Liverpool in 1970. On July 20, 2020, construction began to build a roundabout at the intersection with PA 850 in Shermans Dale. The roundabout opened to traffic on October 22, 2021.

== Major intersections ==
County	Location	mi	km	Destinations	Notes
Adams	Gettysburg	0.000	0.000	US 15 Bus. (Carlisle Street/East Lincoln Avenue) – Harrisburg	Southern terminus of PA 34
Adams	Biglerville	6.432	10.351	PA 394 (Hanover Street)	
Adams	Biglerville	6.572	10.577	PA 234 (York Street)	
Cumberland	Mount Holly Springs	19.954	32.113	PA 94 south (South Baltimore Avenue) – York Springs, Hanover	Northern terminus of PA 94
Cumberland	Mount Holly Springs	22.990	36.999	PA 174 (Old York Road)	
Cumberland	Carlisle	26.048– 26.069	41.920– 41.954	I-81 – Chambersburg, Harrisburg	I-81 exit 47
Cumberland	Carlisle	26.998	43.449	US 11 south / PA 74 / PA 641 (High Street) to I-81	Southern end of US 11 concurrency
Cumberland	Carlisle	27.362	44.035	US 11 north (Hanover Street)	Northern end of US 11 concurrency
Cumberland	Middlesex Township	31.973	51.456	PA 944 west (Enola Road) – Bloserville, Roxbury	Southern end of PA 944 concurrency
Cumberland	Middlesex Township	32.297	51.977	PA 944 east (Enola Road) – Enola	Northern end of PA 944 concurrency
Perry	Carroll Township	37.395	60.181	PA 850 east (Valley Road) – Marysville, Harrisburg	Roundabout; southern end of PA 850 concurrency
Perry	Carroll Township	39.843	64.121	PA 850 west – Landisburg	Northern end of PA 850 concurrency
Perry	Carroll Township	43.838	70.550	PA 274 east – Duncannon	Southern end of PA 274 concurrency
Perry	New Bloomfield	47.221	75.995	PA 274 west (Main Street) – Blain	Traffic circle; northern end of PA 274 concurrency
Perry	Oliver Township	52.053	83.771	PA 849 east – Duncannon	Southern end of PA 849 concurrency
Perry	Newport	52.640	84.716	PA 849 west – Markelsville	Northern end of PA 849 concurrency
Perry	Howe Township	54.486– 54.512	87.687– 87.729	US 22 / US 322 – Lewistown, Harrisburg	Interchange
Perry	Buffalo Township	62.289	100.244	US 11 / US 15 (Susquehanna Trail) – Selinsgrove, Williamsport, Harrisburg	Northern terminus of PA 34
1.000 mi = 1.609 km; 1.000 km = 0.621 mi: Concurrency terminus
