= Biglerville High School =

Coordinates: 39.93392°N 77.24656°W

- 161 North Main Street, Biglerville, Pennsylvania, U.S. Adams County

Information
- Type: Public
- Principal: Beth Graham
- Teaching staff: 42.25 (on an FTE basis)
- Grades: 9-12
- Enrollment: 523 (2023–2024)
- Student to teacher ratio: 12.38
- Campus type: Rural
- Colors: Black and gold
- Mascot: Canner
- Website: Biglerville High School

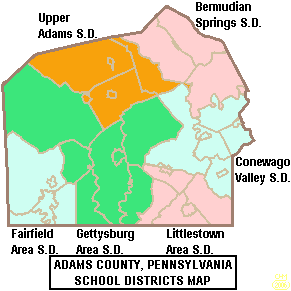
Map of Adams County, Pennsylvania school districts

Biglerville High School is a small public high school located in the borough of Biglerville, Pennsylvania. It is part of the Upper Adams School District. The high school serves the boroughs of Biglerville, Bendersville, and Arendtsville. It also serves the residents of Tyrone Township, Butler Township, and Menallen Township. As of the 2020–2021 school year, enrollment was 540.

Biglerville High School students may choose to attend Cumberland Perry Vocational Technical School for vocational training. The Lincoln Intermediate Unit IU12 provides the school with a wide variety of services, such as specialized education for disabled students and hearing, speech and visual disability services and professional development for staff and faculty.

== Academics ==
Biglerville High School offers a small selection of AP courses including:

Human Geography, World History: Modern, 2D Art, 3D Art and Design, Art Drawing, English Literature and Composition, Spanish Language and Culture, French Language and Culture, and Statistics.

The school also offers dual-enrollment classes through Harrisburg Area Community College and Harrisburg University, allowing students to earn college credits while they are still in high school.

== Campus ==
The high school is housed in a 198,000 square foot building along with Upper Adams Middle School. The building is split into two floors, with classrooms on both levels. The school has two gymnasiums and various athletic training spaces. Biglerville's football stadium, Musselman Stadium, is a grass field with a four-lane track.

== Extracurriculars ==
Biglerville High School offers a wide variety of sports for students to participate in. The school is in Pennsylvania Interscholastic Athletic Association (PIAA) District 3. The school's mascot is a Canner.

=== Sports ===
The district funds (as of 2022):

Boys:

- Baseball: AAA
- Basketball: AAAA
- Cross Country: AA
- Football: AAA
- Soccer: AA
- Tennis: AA
- Track and Field: AA
- Wrestling: AA

Girls:

- Basketball: AAA
- Cross Country: AA
- Field Hockey: A
- Soccer: AA
- Softball: AAA
- Tennis: AA
- Track and Field: AA

=== Band ===
The BHS band is a program that offers many music ensemble including:

- Concert Band, Marching Band, Jazz Band, Indoor Drumline, Indoor Guard

Marching Band Championship Titles
Year	Circuit	Championship Type	Division	Score
2004	TOB	Chapter 6 Championship	Group 1	89.65
2006	TOB	Chapter 6 Championship	Group 1	89.10
2007	TOB	Chapter 6 Championship	Group 1	94.30
2008	USSBA TOB	Nationals Chapter 6 Championship	Group 1	93.925 95.80
2009	TOB	Chapter 6 Championship	Group 1	96.45
2010	TOB	Chapter 6 Championship Atlantic Coast Championship	Group 1-Open	94.65 96.90
2011	TOB	Chapter 6 Championship	Group 1-Open	92.15
2012	TOB	Chapter 6 Championship	Group 1-Open	93.20
2013	TOB	Chapter 6 Championship Atlantic Coast Championship	Group 1-Open	93.95 96.80
2014	TOB	Atlantic Coast Championship	Group 1-Open	95.75
2015	TOB	Chapter 6 Championship Atlantic Coast Championship	Group 1-Open	93.65 97.00
2016	TOB	Chapter 6 Championship Atlantic Coast Championship	Group 1-Open	93.85 95.85
2017	TOB	Chapter 6 Championship Atlantic Coast Championship	Group 1-Open	95.55 98.15**
2018	TOB	Chapter 6 Championship Atlantic Coast Championship	Group 1-Open	93.90 94.45
2022	Cavalcade	Championships	Independence A	95.985***
2023	Cavalcade	Championships	Independence Open	92.550

**Highest Group 1-Open Score in Tournament of Bands

***Highest A Class score in Cavalcade of Bands

_________________________________________________________________________

Indoor Drumline Championship Titles
Year	Circuit	Division	Score
2000	KIDA	Gold Moving Percussion	83.80
2004	KIDA	Gold Percussion Ensemble	85.10
2008	KIDA	Gold Moving Percussion	86.80
2010	TIA	Scholastic Intermediate (Chapter 6 Championship)	87.60
2017	KIDA	Scholastic Gold Percussion Ensemble	90.10
2018	KIDA	Scholastic Gold Percussion Ensemble	79.55
2023	KIDA	Scholastic Gold Percussion Ensemble	79.400
2025	WGI	Scholastic A Concert (Virtual)	17.00**

**Rating out of 20

_________________________________________________________________________

Indoor Guard Championship Titles
Year	Circuit	Circuit/Division	Score
2007	KIDA	Gold Guard	86.00
2008	KIDA	White Guard	90.40
2010	TIA	Scholastic Intermediate (Chapter 6 Championship)	85.30
2013	KIDA	Blue Guard	94.13
2024	KIDA	Scholastic Regional A	90.608
2025	KIDA	Scholastic AA	83.608

== See also ==
- High schools in Pennsylvania
