= Pennsylvania Route 394 =

State highway in Adams County, Pennsylvania, US

Pennsylvania Route 394

Route information
- Maintained by PennDOT
- Length: 13.452 mi (21.649 km)

Major junctions
- West end: PA 234 in Biglerville
- PA 34 in Biglerville; US 15 Bus. in Straban Township; US 15 in Straban Township
- East end: PA 94 in Hampton

Location
- Country: United States
- State: Pennsylvania
- Counties: Adams

Highway system
- Pennsylvania State Route System; Interstate; US; State; Scenic; Legislative
← PA 393	→ PA 399

Pennsylvania Route 394 (PA 394) is a 13.5-mile-long (21.7 km) state highway located in Adams County, Pennsylvania. The western terminus is at PA 234 in Biglerville. The eastern terminus is at PA 94 in Hampton. PA 394 is a two-lane undivided road that passes through rural areas to the northeast of Gettysburg. The route begins at PA 234 and crosses PA 34 before leaving Biglerville and heading southeast. PA 394 forms a concurrency with U.S. Route 15 Business (US 15 Bus.) before the business route reaches its terminus at an interchange with the US 15 freeway. From here, PA 394 continues southeast to Hunterstown, where it turns northeast and continues to its terminus at PA 94. PA 394 was designated in 1928 along its present alignment. The entire route was paved in the 1930s. US 15 Bus. became concurrent with PA 394 in 1963 after US 15 was moved to a freeway alignment.

== Route description ==
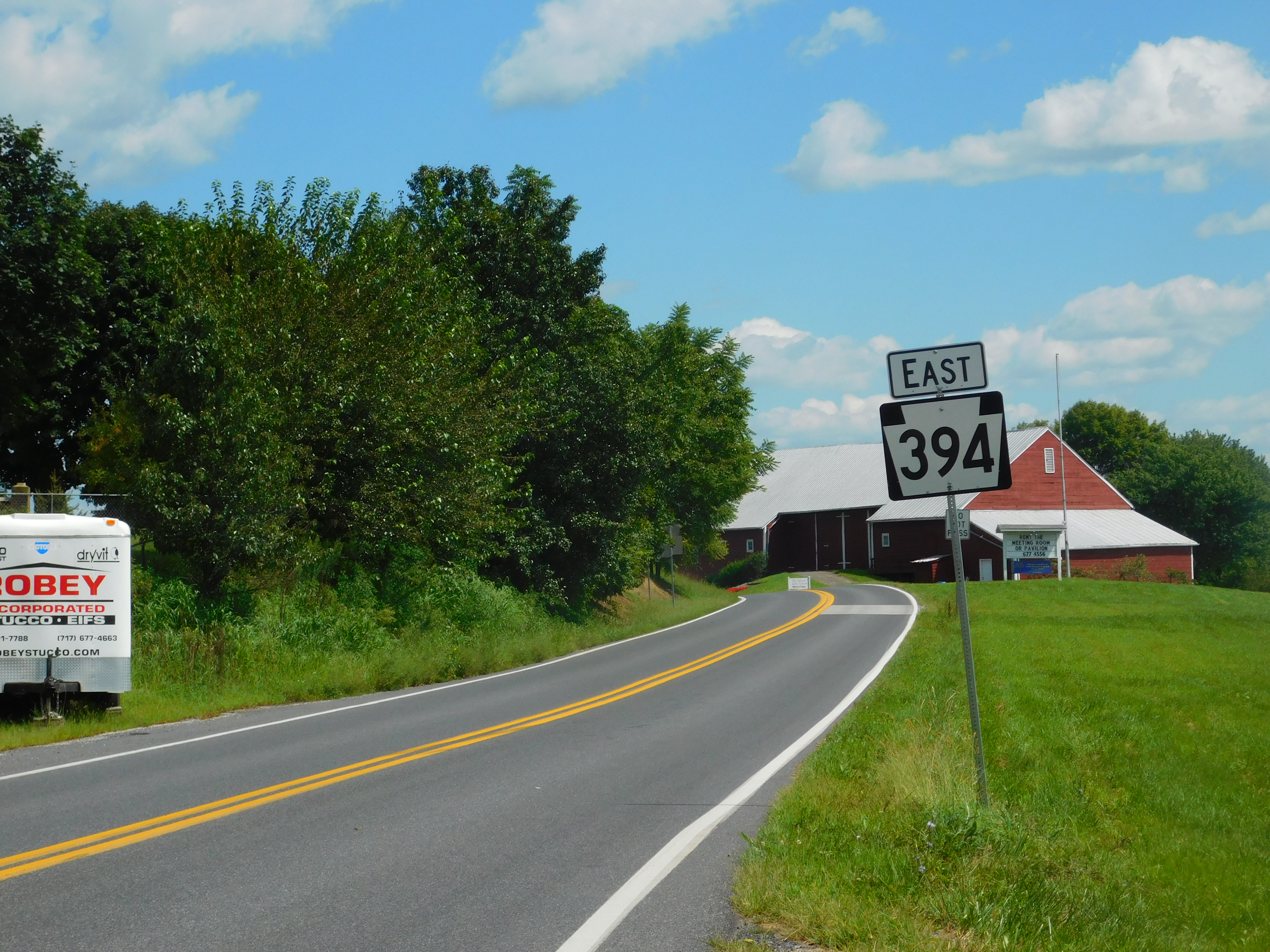
PA 394 in Biglerville

PA 394 begins at an intersection with PA 234 in the borough of Biglerville, heading southeast on two-lane undivided Hanover Street. The road passes homes and reaches the PA 34 intersection. Past here, the route enters industrial areas and crosses the Gettysburg and Northern Railroad. PA 394 continues into Butler Township and becomes Table Rock Road as it heads into agricultural areas with some homes and woods. The road turns south into woodland, crossing the Conewago Creek and reaching the community of Table Rock. Here, PA 394 turns southeast onto Shrivers Corner Road and continues through a mix of farmland and woodland into Straban Township. The route intersects US 15 Bus. at Old Harrisburg Road in Shrivers Corner and forms a concurrency with that route, coming to an interchange with the US 15 freeway. At this point, US 15 Bus. ends and PA 394 heads through more rural areas with some homes, passing through the community of Hunterstown. Here, the name of the road becomes Hunterstown Hampton Road and it makes a turn northeast into open farmland. After passing through New Chester, the route enters wooded areas with some homes crosses the Conewago Creek into Reading Township. In this area, PA 394 passes more farm fields before entering the residential community of Hampton and reaching its eastern terminus at a roundabout with PA 94.

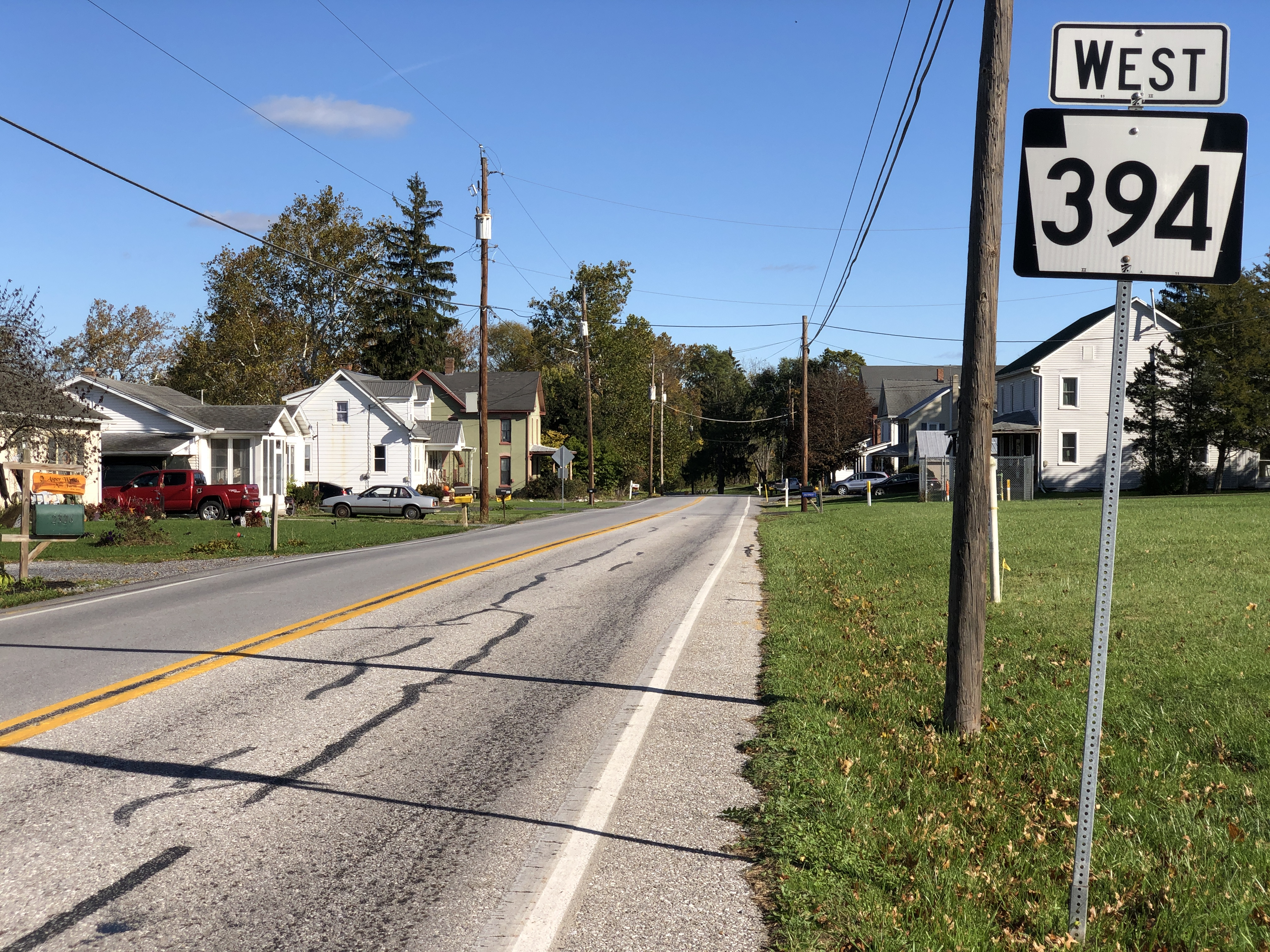
PA 394 westbound in Butler Township

== History ==
When Pennsylvania legislated routes in 1911, what is now PA 394 was not assigned a number. PA 394 was designated in 1928 to run from PA 234 in Biglerville east to PA 94 in Hampton, following its current alignment. Upon designation, the section of the route between US 15 (Old Harrisburg Road) and Hunterstown was paved while the remainder was unpaved. By 1930, PA 394 was paved for a short distance to the east of Biglerville and for a short distance to the east of Hunterstown. The entire length of the route was paved in the 1930s. In 1963, US 15 was shifted from Old Harrisburg Road to a freeway alignment to the east, with an interchange built at PA 394. US 15 Bus. was designated concurrent with PA 394 between Old Harrisburg Road, where it turned south, and the US 15 interchange, where it reached its northern terminus. In 2020, a roundabout was constructed at the intersection with PA 94 in Hampton.

== Major intersections ==
The entire route is in Adams County.

Location	mi	km	Destinations	Notes
Biglerville	0.000	0.000	PA 234 (Arendtsville Road) – Arendtsville, Heidlersburg	Western terminus
Biglerville	0.439	0.707	PA 34 (Main Street)	
Straban Township	4.815	7.749	US 15 Bus. south (Old Harrisburg Road) – Gettysburg	West end of US 15 Bus. concurrency
Straban Township	5.276	8.491	US 15 – Harrisburg, Frederick US 15 Bus. ends	Interchange; northern terminus of US 15 Bus.
Reading Township	13.452	21.649	PA 94 (Carlisle Pike) – York Springs, Hanover	Roundabout; eastern terminus
1.000 mi = 1.609 km; 1.000 km = 0.621 mi: Concurrency terminus
