= Pennsylvania Route 234 =

State highway in Pennsylvania, US

Pennsylvania Route 234

Route information
- Maintained by PennDOT
- Length: 38.322 mi (61.673 km)

Major junctions
- West end: US 30 in Franklin Township
- PA 394 in Biglerville; PA 34 in Biglerville; US 15 in Tyrone Township; PA 94 in Reading Township; PA 194 in East Berlin
- East end: PA 462 in West York

Location
- Country: United States
- State: Pennsylvania
- Counties: Adams, York

Highway system
- Pennsylvania State Route System; Interstate; US; State; Scenic; Legislative
← PA 233	→ PA 235

Pennsylvania Route 234 (PA 234) is a 38-mile-long (61 km) state highway located in Adams and York Counties in Pennsylvania. The western terminus is at U.S. Route 30 (US 30) in Franklin Township. The eastern terminus is at PA 462 in West York. PA 234 heads east from US 30 as a two-lane undivided road through rural areas in northern Adams County, passing through Arendtsville before it reaches Biglerville, where it intersects PA 394 and PA 34. The route continues east and has an interchange with the US 15 freeway in Heidlersburg and crosses PA 94 prior to reaching East Berlin, where it intersects PA 194. PA 234 crosses into York County and heads through rural areas in the western part of the county. Right before its eastern terminus at PA 462, PA 234 crosses US 30 on an overpass; however, there is no direct access to the highway. PA 234 was designated in 1928 between US 30 in Franklin Township and PA 194 in East Berlin. The route was extended east from East Berlin to US 30 (now PA 462) west of West York in 1937. The entire route was paved in the 1930s.

== Route description ==
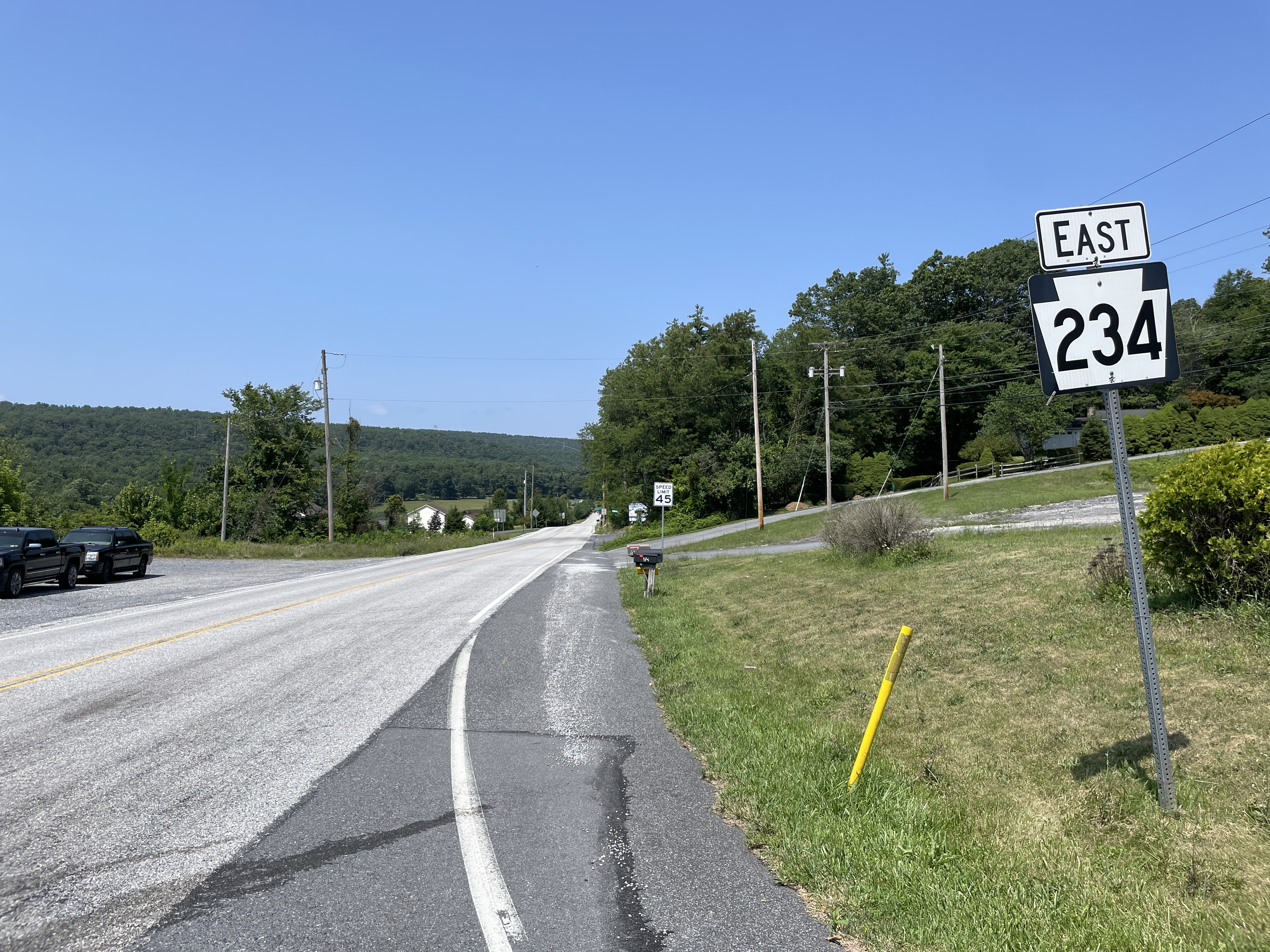
PA 234 eastbound past US 30 in Franklin Township

PA 234 begins at an intersection with US 30 in Franklin Township, Adams County, heading north on two-lane undivided Buchanan Valley Road. The road runs through farms and forests with some homes, turning northeast and passing through Trust. The route continues through rural areas as it curves more to the east and winds through forests along the Conewago Creek, eventually crossing the creek into Menallen Township. PA 234 continues southeast a short distance to the northeast of the creek on Narrows Road. The road crosses the creek again and heads back into Franklin Township, passing through Bridgeport and heading east before turning south in agricultural areas with a few homes. The route enters the borough of Arendtsville and becomes North High Street, passing homes. PA 234 turns east onto Main Street and continues through more residential areas. The road crosses the Conewago Creek into Butler Township and becomes Arendtsville Road, running through open farmland with a few homes. The route heads into the borough of Biglerville and intersects the western terminus of PA 394, becoming West York Street and passing residences. The road becomes East York Street and crosses PA 34, continuing east and crossing the Gettysburg and Northern Railroad at-grade.

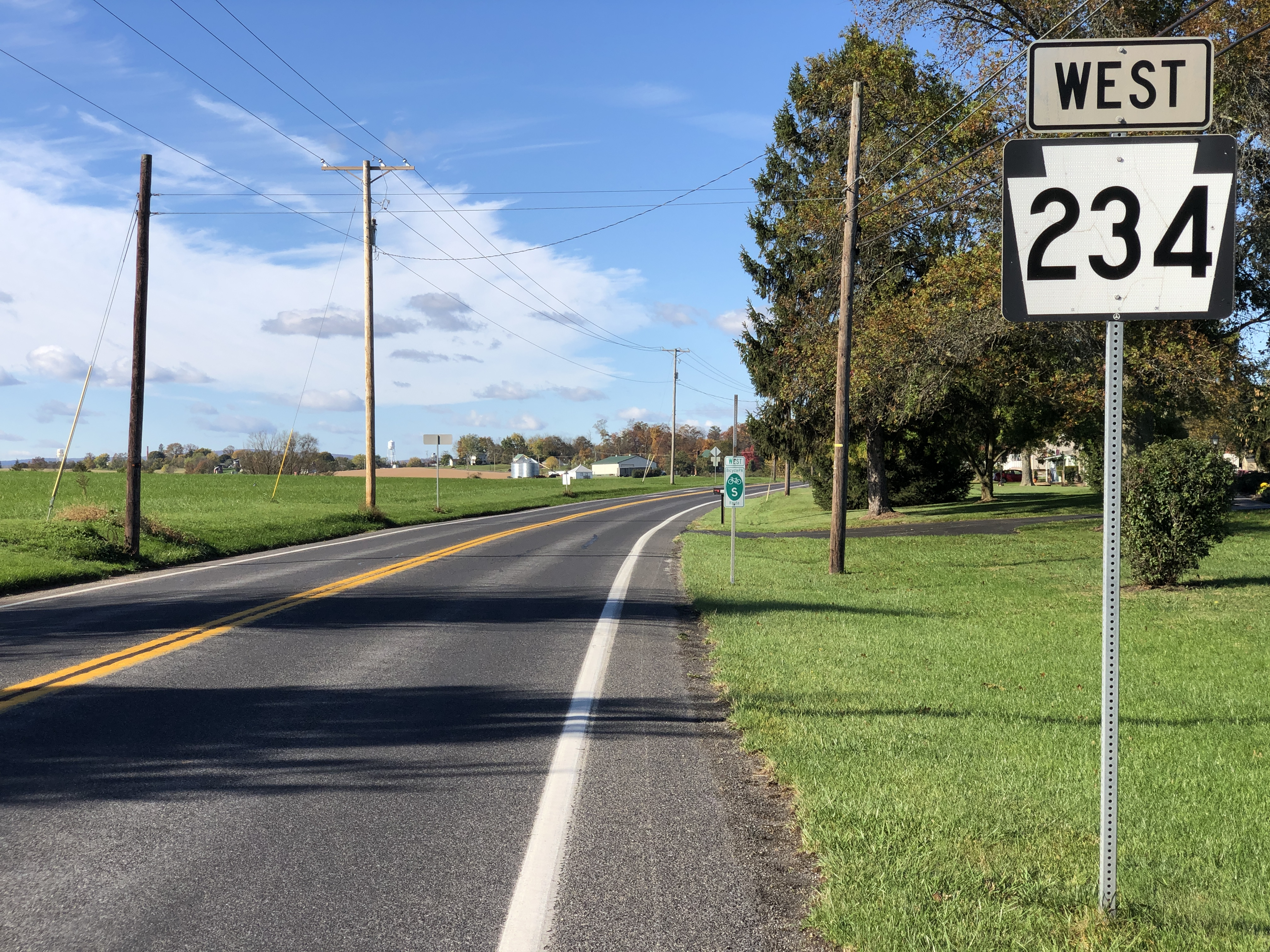
PA 234 westbound in Butler Township

PA 234 turns northeast and heads back into Butler Township, becoming Heidlersburg Road and running through more open agricultural areas with occasional homes. The road curves more to the east and crosses into Tyrone Township, running through more rural areas. The route passes through Heidlersburg, where it intersects Old Harrisburg Road, and continues to an interchange with the US 15 freeway. From here, PA 234 runs through a mix of farmland and woodland with some residences on East Berlin Road, becoming the border between Huntington Township to the north and Tyrone Township to the south as it heads through Five Points. From this point, the road becomes the border between Reading Township to the north and Tyrone Township to the south, briefly heading entirely into Tyrone Township prior to crossing the Plum Run into Reading Township. In this area, the route intersects PA 94 before continuing east through more agricultural areas. PA 234 crosses the Conewago Creek into the borough of East Berlin and becomes West King Street, passing homes along with a few businesses. In the center of town, the route intersects PA 194 and becomes East King Street.

PA 234 crosses into Paradise Township in York County and becomes East Berlin Road, heading east through more farmland with a few homes. The road runs through more rural areas as it passes through Jackson Township. The route briefly passes through Dover Township before crossing the Honey Run into West Manchester Township. In this area, PA 234 runs through more agricultural areas as it passes to the north of a quarry. The road comes to a bridge over the US 30 freeway and heads into industrial areas. Farther east, PA 234 heads into residential areas and comes to its eastern terminus at PA 462 just outside the borough of West York.

== History ==
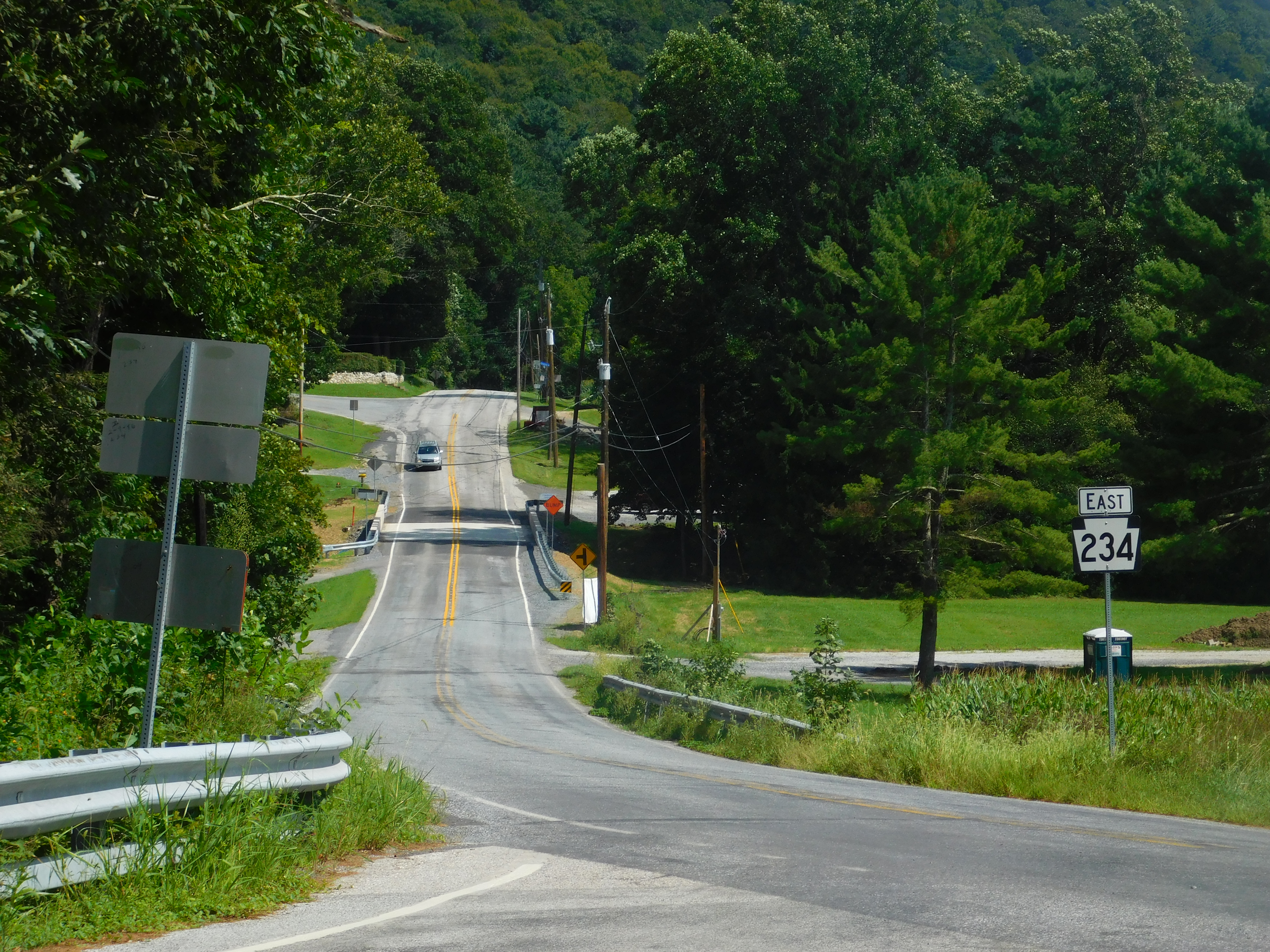
PA 234 west of Arendtsville

When routes were legislated in Pennsylvania in 1911, present-day PA 234 was not given a number. By this time, the road between Arendtsville and Biglerville was paved. PA 234 was designated in 1928 to run from US 30 in western Adams County east to PA 194 in East Berlin. At this time, the route was paved between US 30 and the eastern edge of Biglerville while the section between Biglerville and East Berlin was unpaved. By 1930, the route was under construction between US 15 (Old Harrisburg Road) in Heidlersburg and PA 194 in East Berlin. In 1937, PA 234 was extended east from PA 194 in East Berlin to US 30 (now PA 462) west of West York. The entire length of the route was paved in the 1930s.

== Major intersections ==
County	Location	mi	km	Destinations	Notes
Adams	Franklin Township	0.000	0.000	US 30 (Chambersburg Road) – Caledonia, Gettysburg, Chambersburg	Western terminus
Adams	Biglerville	11.995	19.304	PA 394 east (Hanover Street)	Western terminus of PA 394
Adams	Biglerville	12.405	19.964	PA 34 (Main Street)	
Adams	Tyrone Township	18.716	30.120	US 15 – Harrisburg, Gettysburg	Interchange
Adams	Reading Township	22.695	36.524	PA 94 (Carlisle Pike) – York Springs, Hanover	
Adams	East Berlin	27.315	43.959	PA 194 (Abbottstown Street/Harrisburg Street)	
York	West York	38.322	61.673	PA 462 (Market Street) – York, Gettysburg	Eastern terminus
1.000 mi = 1.609 km; 1.000 km = 0.621 mi
