= Pennsylvania Route 849 =

State highway in Pennsylvania, US

Pennsylvania Route 849

Route information
- Maintained by PennDOT
- Length: 24.779 mi (39.878 km)

Major junctions
- West end: PA 74 in Saville Township
- PA 34 in Newport
- East end: US 22 / US 322 near Duncannon

Location
- Country: United States
- State: Pennsylvania
- Counties: Perry, Dauphin

Highway system
- Pennsylvania State Route System; Interstate; US; State; Scenic; Legislative
← PA 848	→ PA 850

Pennsylvania Route 849 (PA 849) is a 24.8-mile-long (39.9 km) state highway located in Perry and Dauphin counties in Pennsylvania. The western terminus is at PA 74 in Saville Township, Perry County. The eastern terminus is at U.S. Route 22 (US 22)/US 322 in Reed Township, Dauphin County, near Duncannon. PA 849 winds east from PA 74 through farms and woods to Newport, where it forms a concurrency with PA 34. From Newport, the route heads southeast through more rural land to Duncannon, where it turns east and crosses the Juniata River to reach its terminus at US 22/US 322 at the community of Benvenue just north of the Susquehanna River.

PA 849 was designated in 1928 to run from PA 74 in Saville Township east to PA 5 (now PA 34) in Newport. The same year, the present route between Duncannon and US 22 became part of PA 33. In 1937, PA 849 was extended east from Newport to PA 14 (which replaced PA 33) in Duncannon. US 11/US 15 replaced the PA 14 designation on the road between Duncannon and US 22/US 322 in 1941. PA 849 was extended east to its current end at US 22/US 322 in the 1950s after US 11/US 15 were moved to a bypass of Duncannon.

== Route description ==
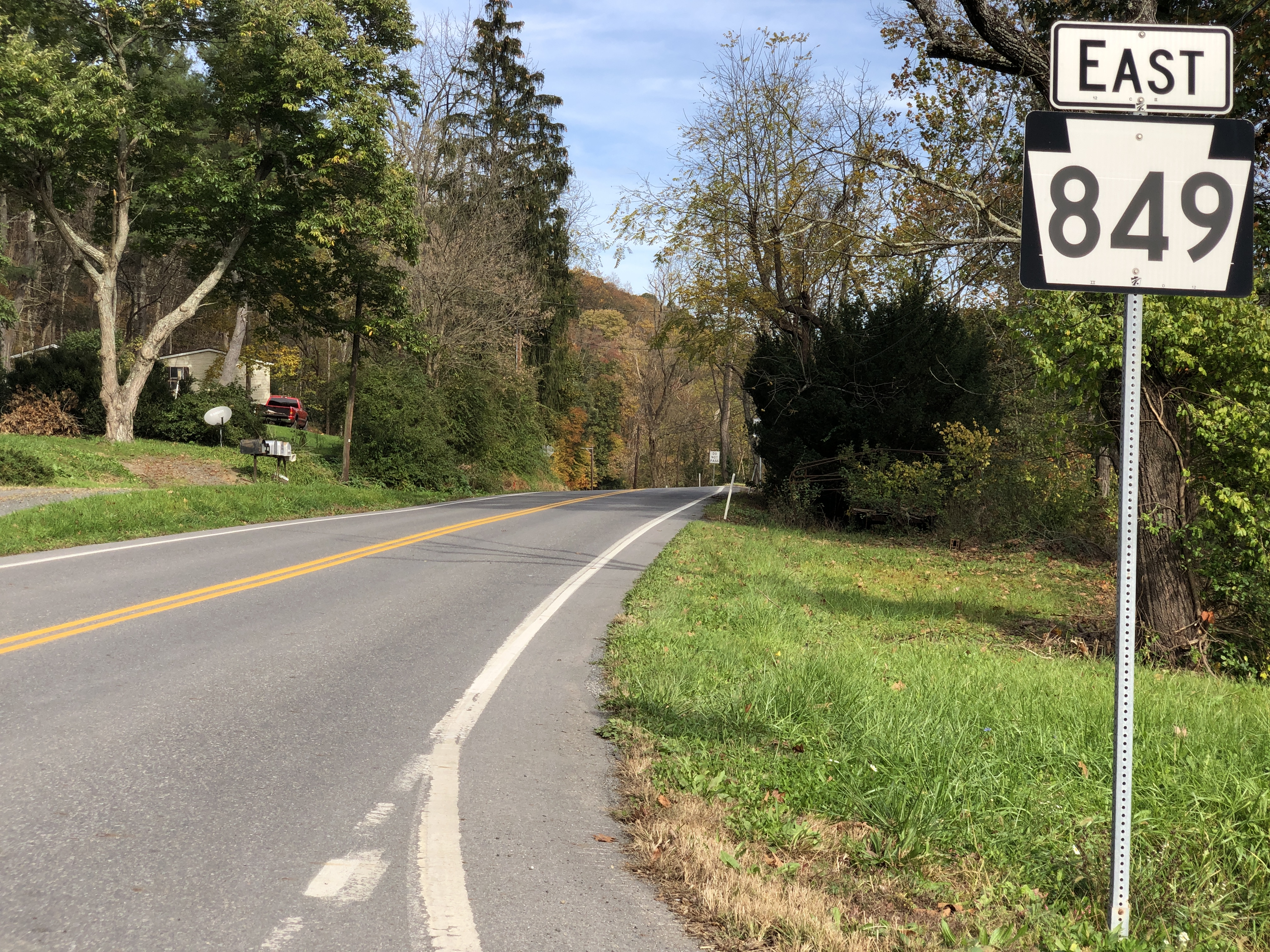
PA 849 eastbound in Saville Township

PA 849 begins at an intersection with PA 74 in the community of Roseburg in Saville Township, Perry County, heading northeast on two-lane undivided Buffalo Trace. The route passes through wooded areas with some fields, following the Buffalo Creek and passing through Eschol. The road heads into Tuscarora Township and becomes Buckwheat Valley Road, turning southeast onto Creek Road a short distance later. PA 849 crosses into Juniata Township and winds through more areas of farmland and woodland along the Buffalo Creek, heading east through Walnut Grove. The road curves to the northeast and reaches Markelsville, where the route turns north to remain on Creek Road. The route winds northeast through more rural areas alongside the creek, turning east as it heads into more agricultural areas with some woods and reaches the community of Wila. At this point, PA 849 turns south before curving back to the east, running through more rural areas. The road enters Oliver Township and turns northeast into wooded areas before a turn to the southeast into residential areas. The route heads east prior to turning south onto 4th Street, heading into the borough of Newport. Here, PA 849 becomes North 4th Street and passes homes and businesses, reaching an intersection with PA 34. At this junction, PA 34 turns south to form a concurrency with PA 849, heading through more developed areas. The road turns south to head back into Oliver Township and become Keystone Way, heading through wooded areas.

PA 849 splits from PA 34 by heading southeast on Newport Road, passing through areas of farms and woods with some homes. The route heads south into forested areas of mountains, crossing into Miller Township, where it turns east and then south to wind across the mountains. The road curves east near a few homes before heading south through more forested mountains. PA 849 turns to the east again and heads through more wooded areas with some fields and homes, curving to the southeast. The road passes near another forested mountain, turning south into Wheatfield Township and curving southwest. The route turns east past a few rural homes prior to heading southeast through agricultural areas with some residences. PA 849 makes a turn to the south and crosses into Penn Township, running through more rural areas and passing over the US 11/US 15 freeway. The road heads through woodland and becomes the border between the borough of Duncannon to the southwest and Penn Township to the northeast, passing homes. The route turns east onto Juniata Road, following the Appalachian Trail, and fully enters Penn Township again, running through wooded areas and passing under Norfolk Southern's Pittsburgh Line. PA 849 crosses the Juniata River into the village of Benvenue in Reed Township in Dauphin County and reaches its eastern terminus at an intersection with US 22/US 322 just north of the Clarks Ferry Bridge over the Susquehanna River, where the Appalachian Trail turns south to cross the river on the Clarks Ferry Bridge. This intersection has no direct access from PA 849 to US 22/US 322 westbound; access is provided by way of a U-turn at the PA 147 interchange on the other side of the Susquehanna River.

== History ==
When routes were legislated in Pennsylvania in 1911, what is now PA 849 was not given a number. PA 849 was designated in 1928 to run from PA 74 southeast of Ickesburg east to PA 5 (now PA 34) in Newport along an unpaved road. The section of the route running from Duncannon across the Juniata River to US 22 was designated as part of PA 33, which was paved. By 1930, a small section of the route to the west of Newport was paved. In 1937, PA 849 was extended east from Newport to PA 14 (Market Street) in Duncannon, with PA 14 replacing PA 33 on the road from Duncannon over the Juniata River to US 11/US 22/US 322. The entire length of PA 849 was paved in the 1930s. In 1941, US 11/US 15 replaced PA 14 on the segment of road between Duncannon and US 22/US 322. In the 1950s, US 11/US 15 were rerouted to bypass Duncannon to the west, and PA 849 was extended east on the former alignment across the Juniata River to end at US 22/US 322.

== Major intersections ==
County	Location	mi	km	Destinations	Notes
Perry	Saville Township	0.000	0.000	PA 74 (Waggoners Gap Road / Veterans Way) – Ickesburg, Port Royal, Carlisle	Western terminus
Perry	Newport	13.725	22.088	PA 34 north (Market Street) – Liverpool	West end of PA 34 concurrency
Perry	Oliver Township	14.315	23.038	PA 34 south (Keystone Way) – New Bloomfield	East end of PA 34 concurrency
Dauphin	Reed Township	24.779	39.878	US 22 east / US 322 east (Benvenue Road) – Halifax, Harrisburg, Lewistown	Eastern terminus; no direct access to US 22/US 322 westbound, access provided via U-turn at PA 147 interchange
1.000 mi = 1.609 km; 1.000 km = 0.621 mi: Concurrency terminus; Incomplete access
