= Thomas Brothers Store =

- U.S. National Register of Historic Places
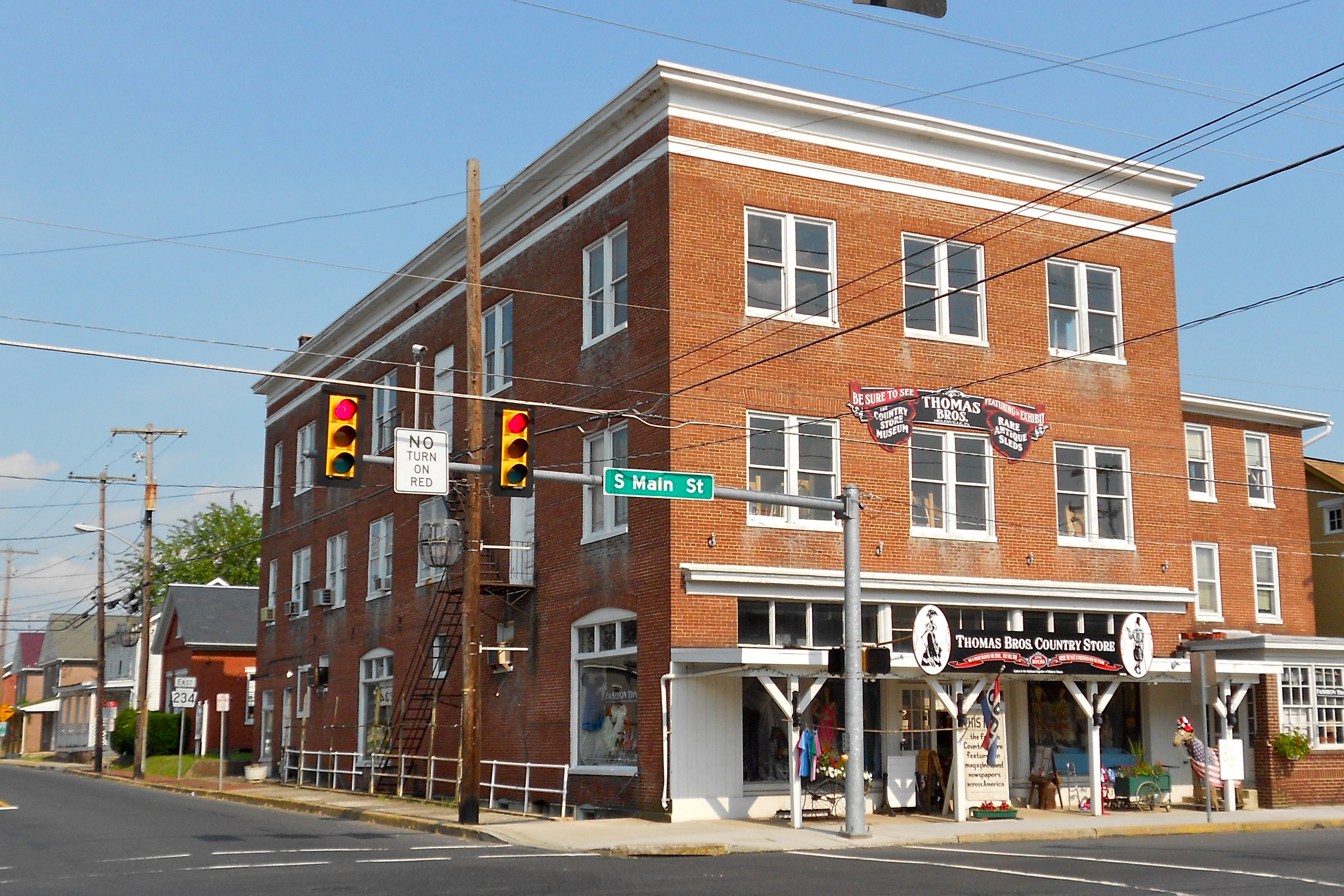

- Location within Pennsylvania Location within the United States
- Location: 4 S. Main St., Biglerville, Pennsylvania
- Coordinates: 39°55′49″N 77°14′55″W
- Area: less than one acre
- Architect: Thomas, Ner C.
- Architectural style: Classical Revival
- NRHP reference No.: 08000780
- Added to NRHP: August 15, 2008

Thomas Brothers Store, also known as the Biglerville Country Store, is an historic general store and residential building that is located in Biglerville in Adams County, Pennsylvania, USA.

It was listed on the National Register of Historic Places in 2008.

== History and architectural features ==
Built in 1912, this historic structure is a three-story, rectangular, brick building with a shed roof. It sits on a stone foundation, has a three-bay, front elevation with a prominent cornice and has Classical Revival style influences. It measures 40 feet (12 m) wide by 100 feet (30 m) deep. Located on the third floor is a large meeting room known as Thomas Hall. Attached to the store building is a three-story, two-bay house that was also built in 1912.

It was listed on the National Register of Historic Places in 2008.
