= Heidlersburg, Pennsylvania =

Unincorporated community in Pennsylvania, US

- Census-designated place
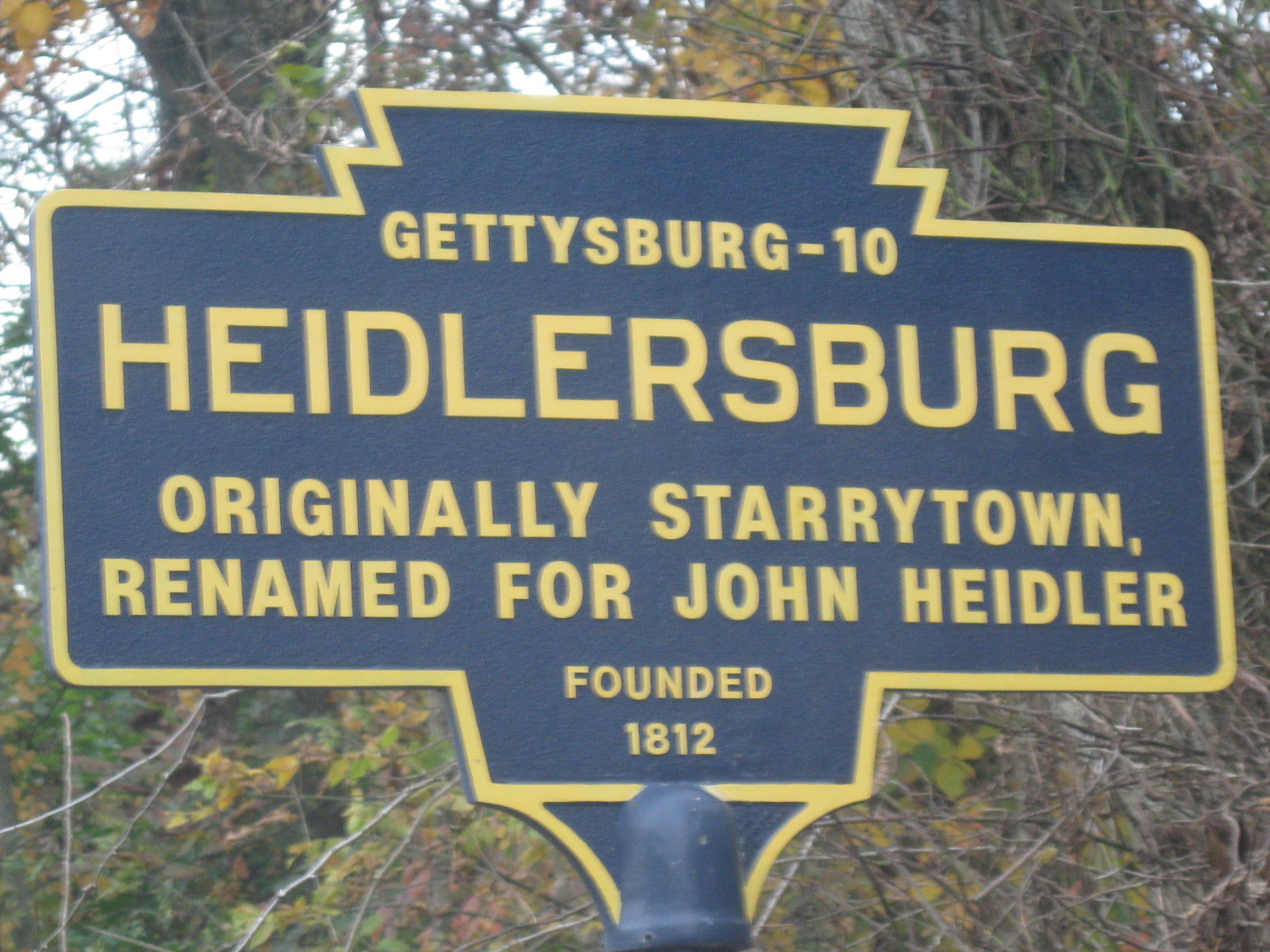
- Keystone Marker

- Location in Adams County and the state of Pennsylvania.
- Coordinates: 39°56′57″N 77°08′46″W
- Country: United States
- State: Pennsylvania
- County: Adams
- Township: Tyrone

Area
  - Total: 0.70 sq mi (1.81 km^{2})
  - Land: 0.70 sq mi (1.81 km^{2})
  - Water: 0 sq mi (0.00 km^{2})
- Elevation: 571 ft (174 m)

Population (2020)
  - Total: 509
  - Density: 728/sq mi (281.2/km^{2})
- Time zone: UTC-5 (Eastern (EST))
  - Summer (DST): UTC-4 (EDT)
- Postal code: 17325
- Area code: 717
- GNIS feature ID: 1176772
- FIPS code: 42-33632

Heidlersburg is an unincorporated community and census-designated place that is located in Tyrone Township, Adams County, Pennsylvania, United States. As of the 2020 census, the population was 509.

== History ==
Heidlersburg was formerly known as Starry Town. There is a volunteer fire company, Company 25. The two churches in Heidlersburg are Heidlersburg United Brethren in Christ Church and St. Mark's Lutheran Church.

== Geography ==
Heidlersburg is located at the crossroads of Pennsylvania Route 234 and Old Harrisburg Road, the former U.S. Route 15. Route 15 now bypasses the town to the east, with access from an exit at Route 234. Gettysburg is 9 miles (14 km) to the south, and Harrisburg is 28 miles (45 km) to the north.

== Demographics ==
Historical population
Census	Pop.	Note	%±
2010	707		—
2020	509		−28.0%
U.S. Decennial Census

== Education ==
It is in the Upper Adams School District.
