= Bendersville station =

Rail station in Bendersville, Pennsylvania, U.S.

Bendersville

General information
- Location: Bendersville, Pennsylvania; United States
- Coordinates: 39°58′37″N 77°13′23″W
- Operator: Gettysburg and Harrisburg Railroad

History
- Opened: 1884

Services
Preceding station	Reading Railroad	Following station
Centre Mills toward Gettysburg	Gettysburg and Harrisburg Railway	Gardners toward Carlisle
Location
- Location within Pennsylvania Location within the United States

Bendersville (colloquialism: "Asper's Station" by 1888) was a Gettysburg and Harrisburg Railroad (G&H) stop east of Bendersville, Pennsylvania, with facilities of Frederick A. Asper that included a 3-story brick flour mill, grain elevator, and warehouse built in 1883 (the latter's roof blew off in 1904). The depot was opposite the mill over the tracks.

The G&H had begun shipments to Asper's mill by November 28, 1883, and when the route was complete to Gettysburg, Bendersville Station was initially the only stop designated as "station" on the original 1884 railroad schedule. The locale's additional industrial facilities subsequently included the 1888 Peters planing mill, a 1902 tannery, the Allen flint mill, a 1922 canning plant, and the 1893 Penn Tile Works (encaustic tile by J. W. Ivery). After the Asper's mill property was sold in 1913, the Aspers Produce Company and Columbia Flint Mill were acquired by the 1919 Aspers Fruit Products Company (liquidated in 1926). The railroad station was eliminated by the development of the concrete highway completed in 1927, the Glen Gary Shale and Brick plant at Aspers became a Pfaltzgraff facility in 1973, and a new post office building was erected in 2001 (the 1934 post office was in Clyde Plank's warehouse).

The locale (Bendersville Station) and populated place (Aspers, the original post office name) were separately designated in 1979 for the Geographic Names Information System, and the Aspers census-designated place was named in 2008 to replace the 2000 census' Bendersville Station-Aspers CDP.
