= Carroll Township, Perry County, Pennsylvania =

Township in Pennsylvania, US

Coordinates: 40°20′00″N 77°09′59″W

- Township
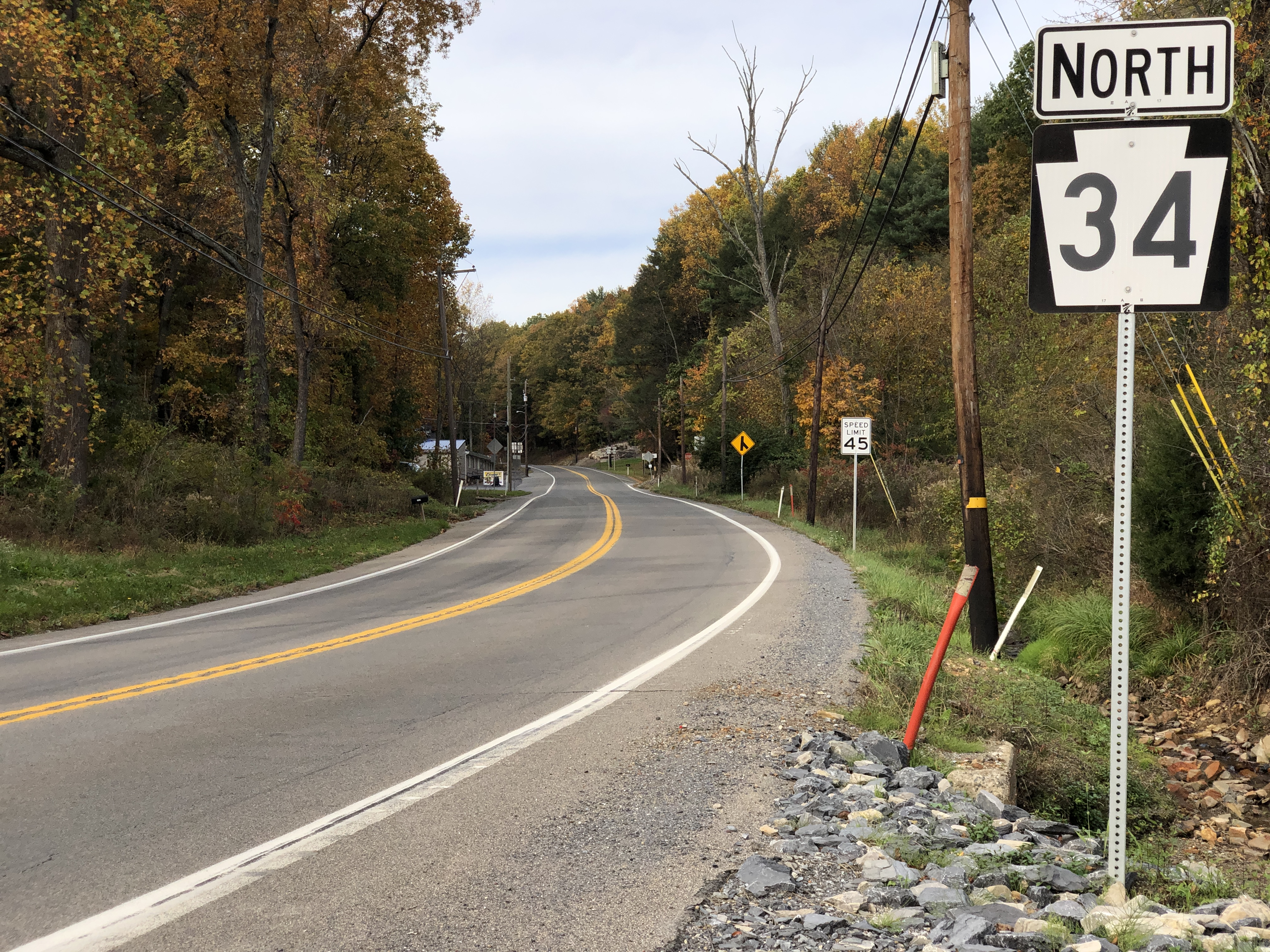
- PA 34 in Carroll Township

- Logo

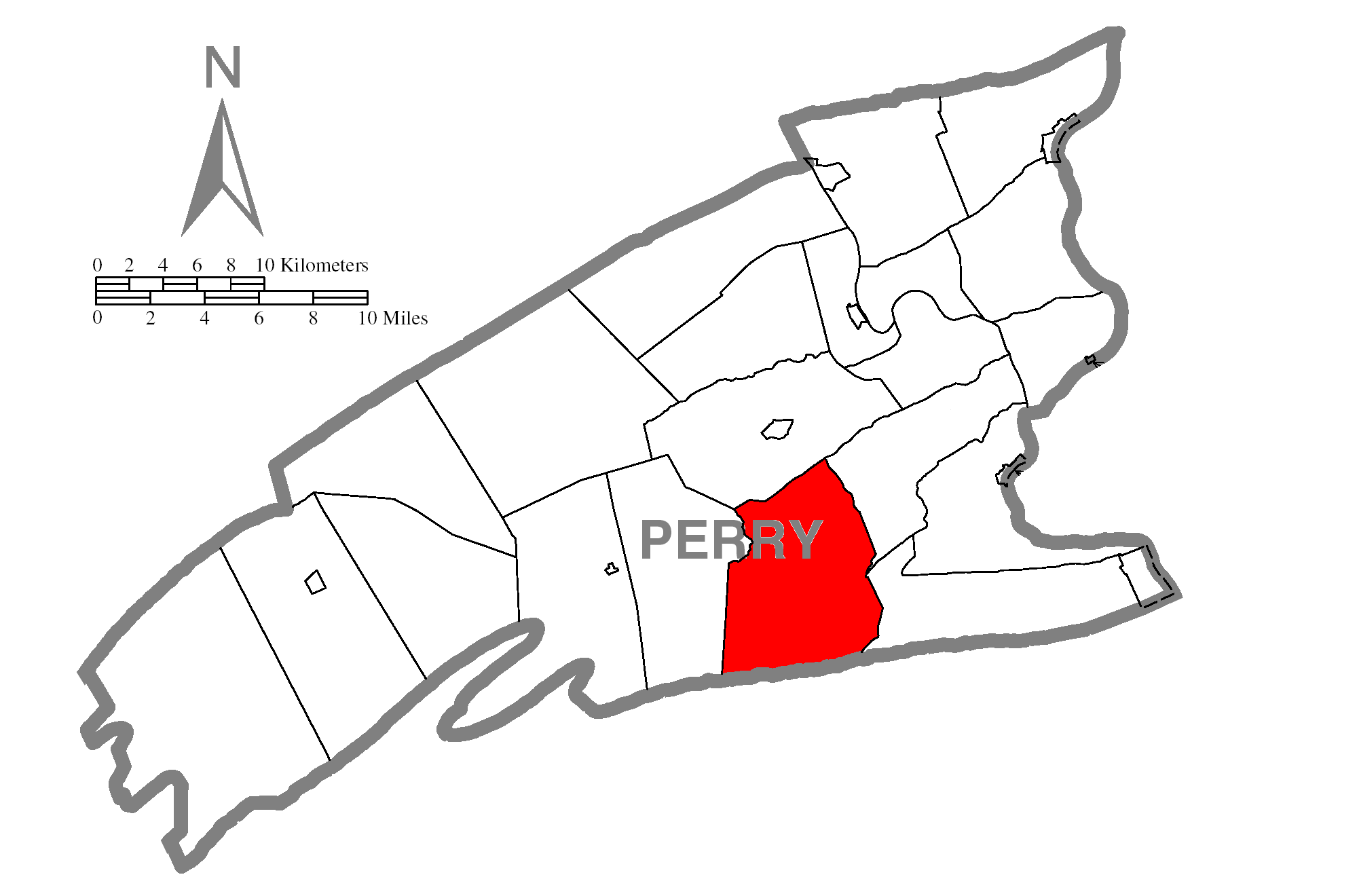
- Map of Perry County, Pennsylvania highlighting Carroll Township

- Map of Perry County, Pennsylvania
- Country: United States
- State: Pennsylvania
- County: Perry
- Settled: 1755
- Incorporated: 1834

Area
  - Total: 34.54 sq mi (89.45 km^{2})
  - Land: 34.27 sq mi (88.77 km^{2})
  - Water: 0.26 sq mi (0.68 km^{2})

Population (2020)
  - Total: 5,238 ▼
  - Estimate (2023): 5,270
  - Density: 153.1/sq mi (59.12/km^{2})
- Time zone: UTC-5 (Eastern (EST))
  - Summer (DST): UTC-4 (EDT)
- Area code: 717
- FIPS code: 42-099-11416
- Website: carrolltwp.org

Carroll Township is a second class township in Perry County, Pennsylvania, United States. The population was 5,238 at the 2020 census. It is one of twenty-two (22) townships in Perry County and one of 1,456 townships in the Commonwealth of Pennsylvania.

== Geography ==
According to the United States Census Bureau, the township has a total area of 34.4 square miles (89 km^{2}), of which 34.4 square miles (89 km^{2}) is land and 0.04 square miles (0.10 km^{2}) (0.09%) is water. The unincorporated community of Shermans Dale is located near the center of the township, along Sherman's Creek.

== Demographics ==
Historical population
| Census | Pop. | Note | %± |
|---|---|---|---|
| 2010 | 5,269 | | — |
| 2020 | 5,238 | | −0.6% |
| 2023 (est.) | 5,270 | | 0.6% |
U.S. Decennial Census

As of the census of 2000, there were 5,095 people, 1,897 households, and 1,472 families living in the township. The population density was 148.1 inhabitants per square mile (57.2/km^{2}). There were 2,036 housing units at an average density of 59.2 per square mile (22.9/km^{2}). The racial makeup of the township was 98.94% White, 0.26% African American, 0.12% Native American, 0.06% Asian, 0.02% Pacific Islander, 0.22% from other races, and 0.39% from two or more races. Hispanic or Latino of any race were 0.61% of the population.

There were 1,897 households, out of which 38.4% had children under the age of 18 living with them, 65.2% were married couples living together, 7.4% had a female householder with no husband present, and 22.4% were non-families. 16.1% of all households were made up of individuals, and 5.0% had someone living alone who was 65 years of age or older. The average household size was 2.69 and the average family size was 3.02.

In the township the population was spread out, with 26.7% under the age of 18, 8.0% from 18 to 24, 33.7% from 25 to 44, 24.1% from 45 to 64, and 7.6% who were 65 years of age or older. The median age was 35 years. For every 100 females, there were 99.6 males. For every 100 females age 18 and over, there were 100.2 males.

The median income for a household in the township was $45,011, and the median income for a family was $48,472. Males had a median income of $31,966 versus $24,677 for females. The per capita income for the township was $19,312. About 3.0% of families and 4.5% of the population were below the poverty line, including 5.7% of those under age 18 and 3.9% of those age 65 or over.

== Parks ==
Carroll Township residents maintain two sports focused, community parks: Burn Hill Park and Valley Road Park.
