= Benvenue, Pennsylvania =

Unincorporated community in Pennsylvania, U.S.

Coordinates: 40°24′14″N 77°00′34″W

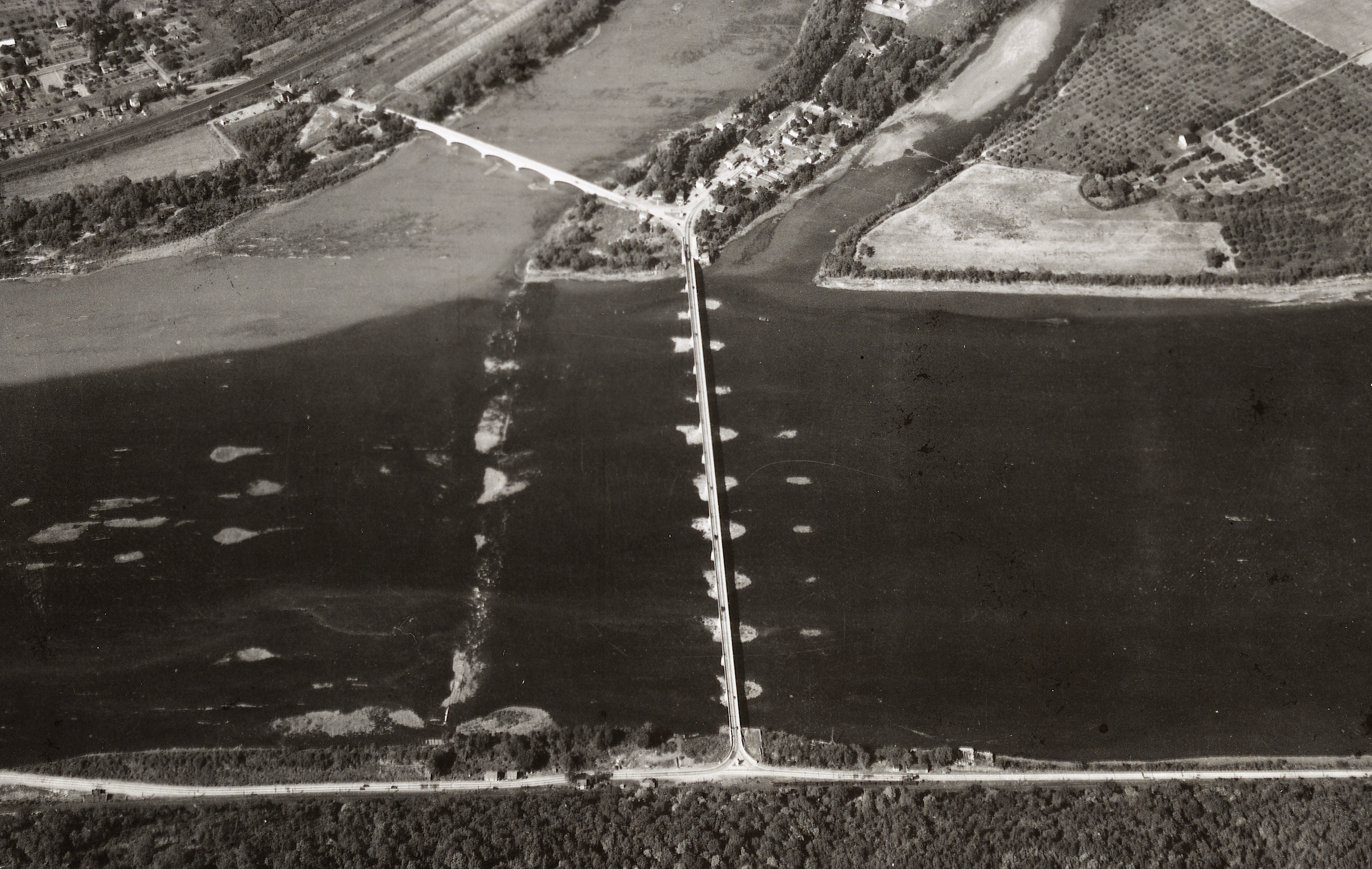
Clarks Ferry Bridge in 1936. Benvenue is the village at the west end of the bridge.

Benvenue is an unincorporated community in Dauphin County, in the U.S. state of Pennsylvania. It is situated on Duncan's Island in Reed Township on the intersection of US 22/US 322 and PA 849, just west of the Clarks Ferry Bridge.

== History ==
A post office called Benvenue was established in 1831, and remained in operation until it was discontinued in 1907. Benvenue is likely derived from Scottish meaning a "mountain and good entertainment therewith".
