= Upper Adams School District =

School district in Pennsylvania

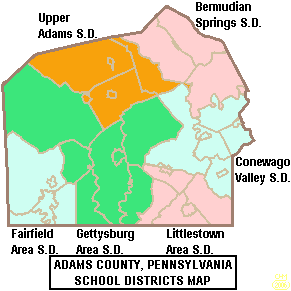
- Map of Adams County school districts

Address
- 161 North Main Street Biglerville, Pennsylvania, U.S. South Central Pennsylvania Biglerville, Pennsylvania, Adams County, 17307-9228; United States

District information
- Type: Public

Other information
- Website: www.upperadams.org

The Upper Adams School District is a small, rural public school district serving parts of Adams County, Pennsylvania, including the boroughs of Bendersville, Biglerville, Arendtsville. It also serves the residents of Tyrone Township, Butler Township, and Menallen Township. Upper Adams School District encompasses approximately 90 square miles (230 km^{2}). By 2010, the district's population rose to 10,836 people. According to 2000 federal census data, it served a resident population of 9,693. In 2009, the district residents' per capita income was $17,278, while the median family income was $44,835. and the United States median family income was $49,445, in 2010. By 2013, the median household income in the United States rose to $52,100.

Upper Adams School District operates: Biglerville Elementary School (K–3), Upper Adams Intermediate School (4–6), Upper Adams Middle School (7–8), and Biglerville High School (9–12). High school students may choose to attend Cumberland Perry Vocational Technical School for vocational training. The Lincoln Intermediate Unit IU12 provides the district with a wide variety of services like specialized education for disabled students and hearing, speech and visual disability services and professional development for staff and faculty.

== Extracurriculars ==
The district offers a variety of clubs, activities and sports. The district funds:

Varsity

Boys

- Baseball - AA
- Basketball- AA
- Cross country - A
- Football - AA
- Soccer - A
- Tennis - AA
- Track and field - AA
- Wrestling - AA

Girls

- Basketball - AA
- Cross country - AA
- Field hockey - AA
- Soccer (fall) - AA
- Softball - AA
- Girls' tennis - AA
- Track and field - AA

Middle school sports

Boys

- Basketball
- Football
- Soccer
- Track and field
- Wrestling

Girls

- Basketball
- Field hockey
- Soccer (fall)
- Track and field

According to PIAA directory July 2013
