= Shermans Dale, Pennsylvania =

Unincorporated community in Pennsylvania, US

Shermans Dale Sherman's Dale Sherman Valley
- Unincorporated community
- Interactive map of Shermans Dale
- Coordinates: 40°19′27″N 77°10′24″W
- Country: United States
- State: Pennsylvania
- County: Perry
- Township: Carroll
- Elevation: 468 ft (143 m)
- Time zone: UTC-5 (EST)
  - Summer (DST): UTC-4 (Eastern Daylight Time)
- ZIP code: 17090
- Area code: 717

Shermans Dale is an unincorporated community in Carroll Township, Perry County, Pennsylvania, United States, along Shermans Creek. It was originally settled by Scots-Irish settlers before the American Revolutionary War. Its ZIP code is 17090.

The public school that serves Shermans Dale is West Perry School District.

== Religion ==
Mt. Gilead United Methodist Church is located here. It is also the site of a former Presbyterian church with a pioneer graveyard. Although this church is no longer used for weekly services, it is maintained for use for weddings and funerals.

== Notable people ==
- Jerry G. Beck Jr., US Army brigadier general
- William Bigler, 12th governor of Pennsylvania and a former U.S. Senator
- Darrell Horcher, former UFC fighter, Bellator and Cage Fury Fighting Championships
- Alexander Kelly McClure, former Pennsylvania State Senator
