= Howe Township, Perry County, Pennsylvania =

Township in Pennsylvania, US

Coordinates: 40°30′06″N 77°06′59″W

- Township
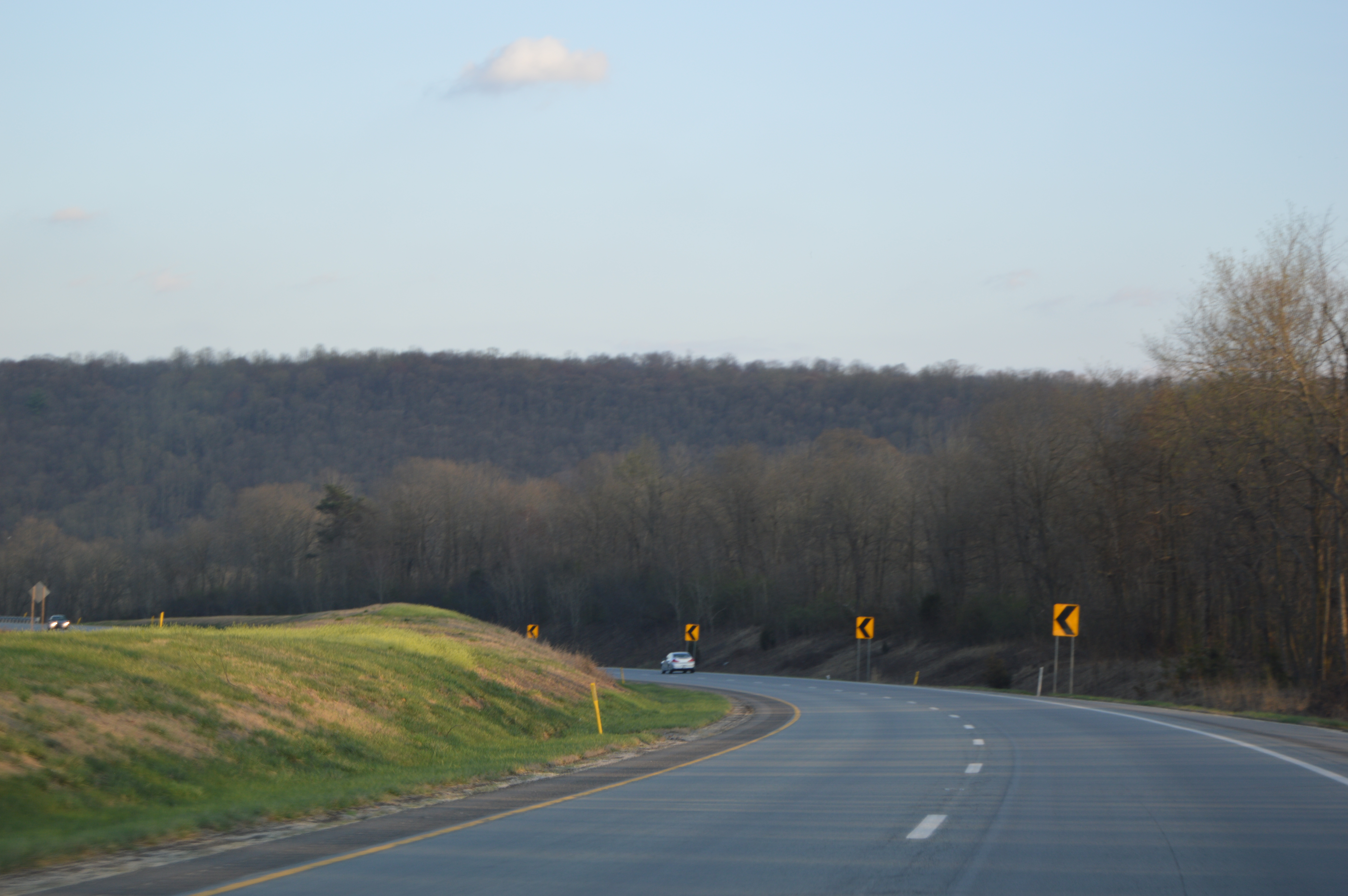
- Along U.S. Routes 22-322 east of Newport

- Flag Logo

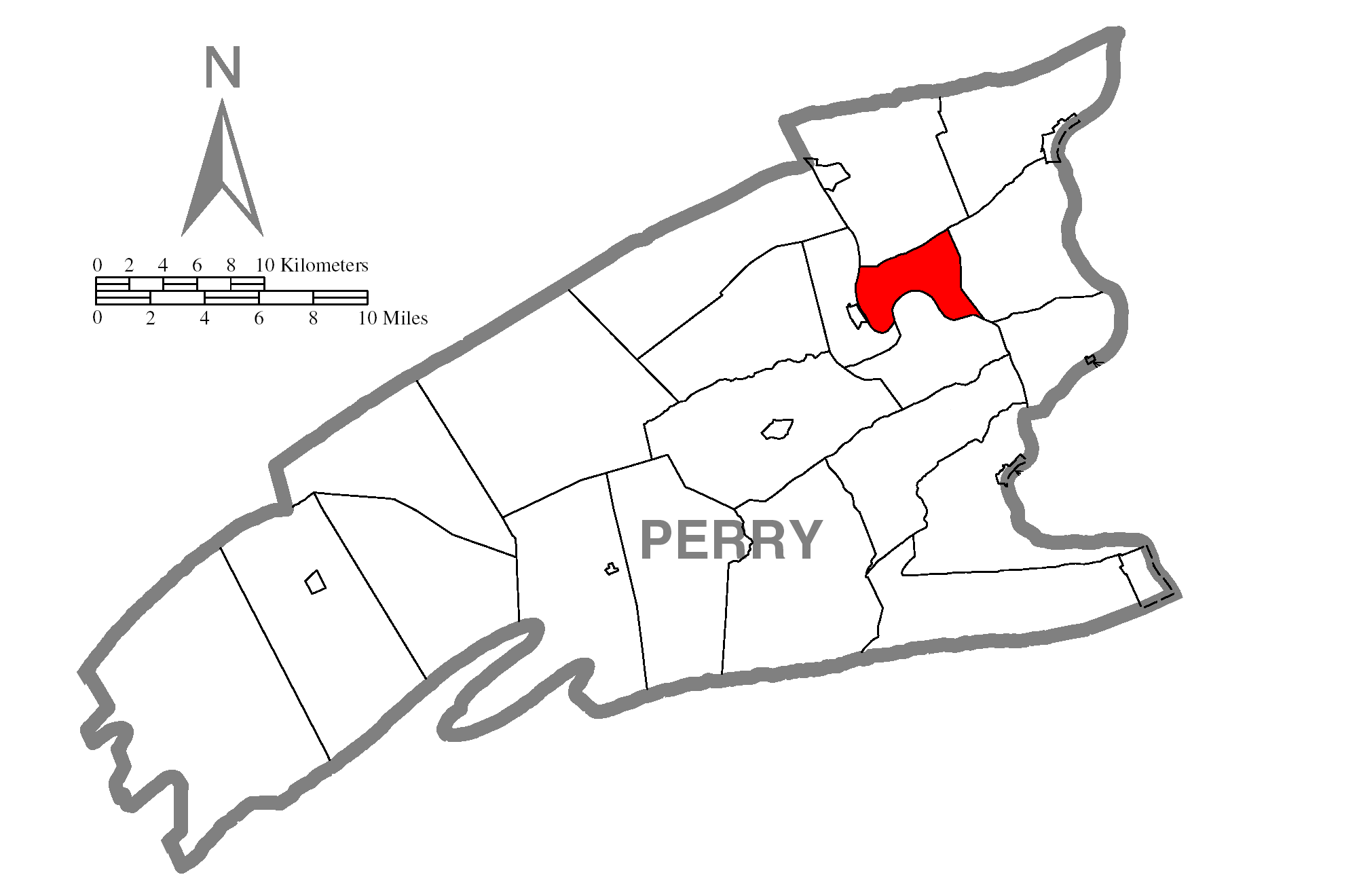
- Map of Perry County, Pennsylvania highlighting Howe Township

- Map of Perry County, Pennsylvania
- Country: United States
- State: Pennsylvania
- County: Perry
- Settled: 1762
- Incorporated: 1861

Area
  - Total: 8.54 sq mi (22.11 km^{2})
  - Land: 8.12 sq mi (21.02 km^{2})
  - Water: 0.42 sq mi (1.09 km^{2})

Population (2020)
  - Total: 376 ▼
  - Estimate (2023): 379
  - Density: 48.1/sq mi (18.56/km^{2})
- Time zone: UTC-5 (Eastern (EST))
  - Summer (DST): UTC-4 (EDT)
- Area code: 717
- FIPS code: 42-099-36000
- Website: Howe Township

Howe Township is a township in Perry County, Pennsylvania, United States. The population was 376 at the 2020 census.

== Geography ==
According to the United States Census Bureau, the township has a total area of 8.6 square miles (22 km^{2}), of which 8.2 square miles (21 km^{2}) is land and 0.4 square miles (1.0 km^{2}) (5.20%) is water.

== Demographics ==
Historical population
Census	Pop.	Note	%±
2010	393		—
2020	376		−4.3%
2023 (est.)	379		0.8%
U.S. Decennial Census

As of the census of 2000, there were 493 people living in 201 households, including 144 families. The population density was 60.1 inhabitants per square mile (23.2/km^{2}). There were 275 housing units at an average density of 33.5 per square mile (12.9/km^{2}). The racial makeup of the township was 97.77% White, 0.20% African American, 0.61% Native American, 0.41% from other races, and 1.01% from two or more races. Hispanic or Latino of any race were 0.61% of the population.

About 26.9% of households had children under 18 living, while 64.7% were married couples living together, 5.5% had a female householder with no husband present, and 27.9% were non-families. 20.9% of all households were made up of individuals, and 11.4% had someone living alone who was 65 years of age or older. The average household size was 2.45 and the average family size was 2.79.

In the township the population was spread out, with 21.9% under the age of 18, 5.1% from 18 to 24, 28.2% from 25 to 44, 26.2% from 45 to 64, and 18.7% who were 65 years of age or older. The median age was 42 years. For every 100 females there were 109.8 males. For every 100 females age 18 and over, there were 104.8 males.

The median income for a household in the township was $46,563, and the median income for a family was $46,875. Males had a median income of $38,542 versus $25,962 for females. The per capita income for the township was $22,521. About 4.8% of families and 4.0% of the population were below the poverty line, including none of those under age 18 and 12.8% of those age 65 or over.
