= Arendtsville, Pennsylvania =

Borough in Pennsylvania, United States

- Borough
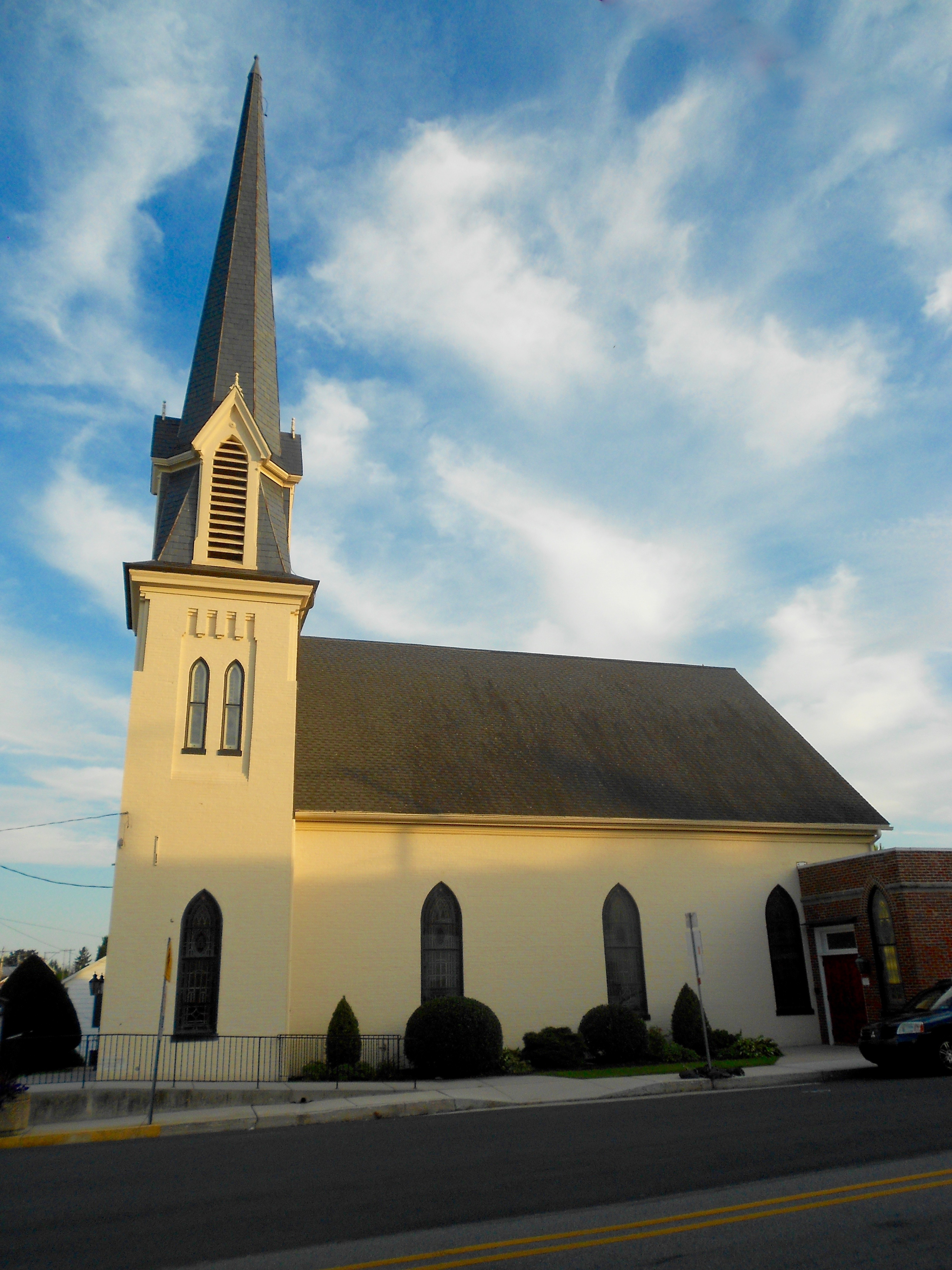
- Zion UCC Church

- Logo

- Location in Adams County and the U.S. state of Pennsylvania.

- Location in Pennsylvania Arendtsville (the United States) Arendtsville (North America)
- Coordinates: 39°55′28″N 77°17′30″W
- Country: United States
- State: Pennsylvania
- County: Adams
- Settled: 1810
- Incorporated: 1896

Government
  - Type: Borough Council

Area
  - Total: 0.80 sq mi (2.07 km^{2})
  - Land: 0.80 sq mi (2.07 km^{2})
  - Water: 0 sq mi (0.00 km^{2})
- Elevation: 702 ft (214 m)

Population (2020)
  - Total: 867
  - Density: 1,082.7/sq mi (418.04/km^{2})
- Time zone: UTC-5 (Eastern (EST))
  - Summer (DST): UTC-4 (EDT)
- Zip Code: 17303
- Area code: 717
- FIPS code: 42-02928
- Website: www.arendtsville.org

Arendtsville is a borough in Adams County, Pennsylvania, United States. The borough lies on Pennsylvania Route 234 and is well known for its annual Apple Harvest Festival in the fall. The population was 867 at the 2020 census.

== History ==
Arendtsville was named for John Arendt, an early settler.

== Geography ==
Arendtsville is located at 39°55′28″N 77°17′50″W (39.924548, -77.297132). According to the U.S. Census Bureau, the borough has a total area of 0.8 square miles (2.1 km^{2}), all land.

The borough is located near South Mountain, the northern extension of the Blue Ridge Mountain Range.

== Demographics ==
Historical population
Census	Pop.	Note	%±
1880	248		—
1900	393		—
1910	383		−2.5%
1920	358		−6.5%
1930	338		−5.6%
1940	381		12.7%
1950	409		7.3%
1960	588		43.8%
1970	589		0.2%
1980	600		1.9%
1990	693		15.5%
2000	848		22.4%
2010	952		12.3%
2020	867		−8.9%

As of the census of 2000, there were 848 people, 329 households, and 242 families residing in the borough. The population density was 1,221.0 inhabitants per square mile (471.4/km^{2}). There were 340 housing units at an average density of 489.5 per square mile (189.0/km^{2}). The racial makeup of the borough was 88.80% White, 1.30% African American, 0.12% Native American, 0.24% Asian, 8.61% from other races, and 0.94% from two or more races. Hispanic or Latino of any race were 16.04% of the population.

There were 329 households, out of which 39.2% had children under the age of 18 living with them, 59.3% were married couples living together, 8.2% had a female householder with no husband present, and 26.4% were non-families. 22.8% of all households were made up of individuals, and 13.1% had someone living alone who was 65 years of age or older. The average household size was 2.58 and the average family size was 3.01.

In the borough the population was spread out, with 29.5% under the age of 18, 6.6% from 18 to 24, 29.2% from 25 to 44, 19.2% from 45 to 64, and 15.4% who were 65 years of age or older. The median age was 34 years. For every 100 females there were 101.4 males. For every 100 females age 18 and over, there were 98.0 males.

The median income for a household in the borough was $41,087, and the median income for a family was $43,889. Males had a median income of $28,828 versus $27,813 for females. The per capita income for the borough was $18,256. About 6.3% of families and 10.6% of the population were below the poverty line, including 17.8% of those under age 18 and 1.7% of those age 65 or over.

== Education ==
The borough is served by the Upper Adams School District. Located in Arendtsville is the district's intermediate school, Upper Adams Intermediate School.
