= Biglerville, Pennsylvania =

Borough in Pennsylvania, US

- Borough
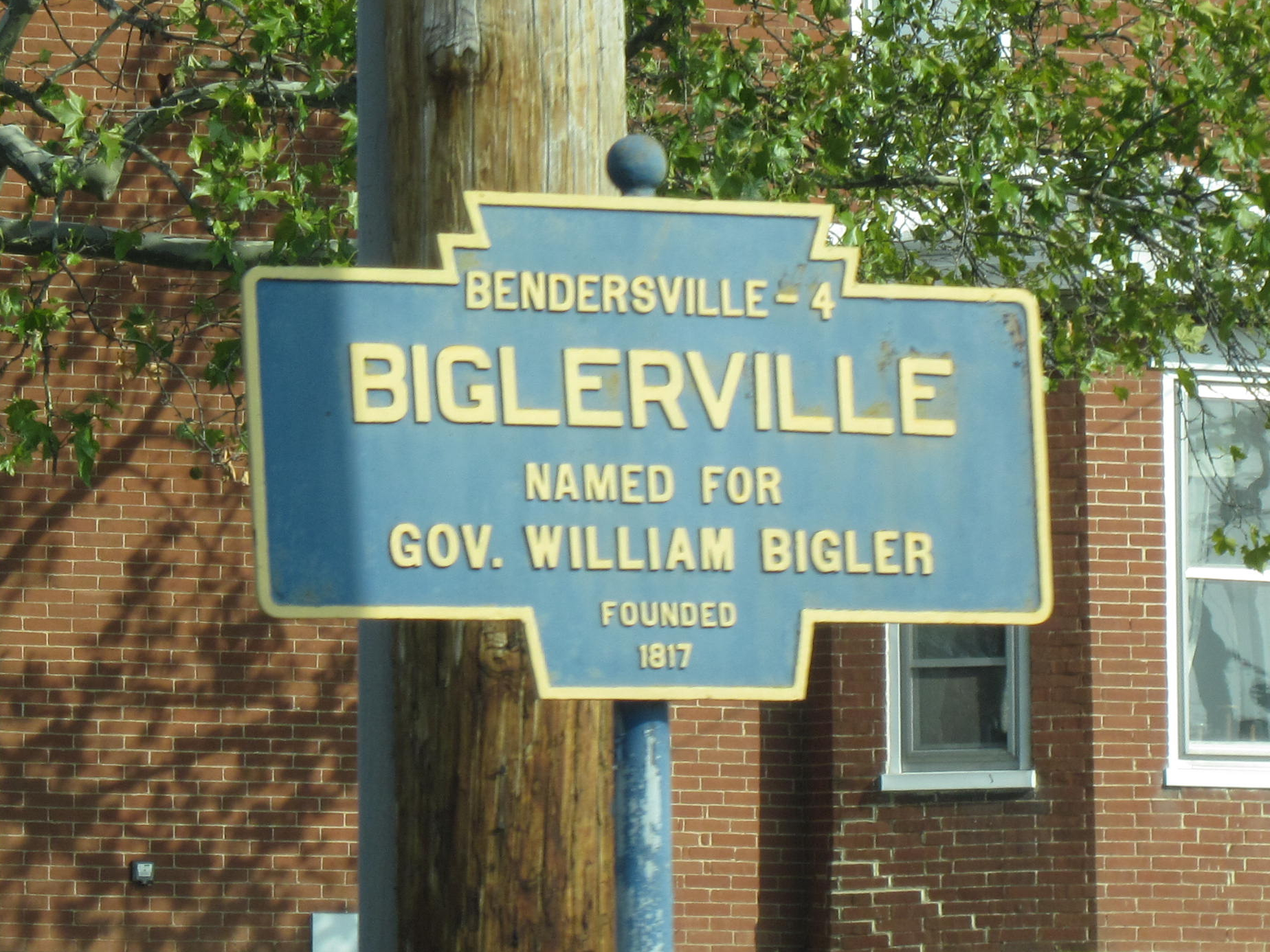
- Keystone Marker

- Logo

- Location in Adams County and the U.S. state of Pennsylvania.

- Location in Pennsylvania and the United States Biglerville (the United States)
- Coordinates: 39°55′49″N 77°14′49″W
- Country: United States
- State: Pennsylvania
- County: Adams
- Settled: 1817
- Incorporated: 1903

Government
  - Type: Borough Council
  - Mayor: Phil Wagner
  - Borough President: Neil Ecker
  - Borough Vice President: John Angstadt

Area
  - Total: 0.65 sq mi (1.69 km^{2})
  - Land: 0.65 sq mi (1.69 km^{2})
  - Water: 0.0039 sq mi (0.01 km^{2})
- Elevation: 640 ft (200 m)

Population (2020)
  - Total: 1,225
  - Density: 1,881.8/sq mi (726.55/km^{2})
- Time zone: UTC-5 (Eastern (EST))
  - Summer (DST): UTC-4 (EDT)
- Zip Code: 17307
- Area codes: 717 and 223
- FIPS code: 42-06296
- Website: http://www.biglerville.us/

Biglerville is a borough in Adams County, Pennsylvania, United States. The population was 1,225 at the 2020 census. The National Apple Museum is located on West Hanover St. in Biglerville. The borough is home to Biglerville High School.

== History ==
Originally named Middletown, it was renamed Biglerville in 1903 after William Bigler, the 12th Governor of Pennsylvania. The Thomas Brothers Store was added to the National Register of Historic Places in 2008. The National Apple Harvest Festival takes place in Biglerville on an annual basis.

== Geography ==
Biglerville is located at 39°55′49″N 77°14′49″W (39.930238, -77.246932). According to the U.S. Census Bureau, the borough has a total area of 0.6 square miles (1.6 km^{2}), all land.

=== Climate ===
Climate data for Biglerville, Pennsylvania (1991–2020 normals, extremes 1972–present)
Month	Jan	Feb	Mar	Apr	May	Jun	Jul	Aug	Sep	Oct	Nov	Dec	Year
Record high °F (°C)	71 (22)	81 (27)	86 (30)	92 (33)	95 (35)	100 (38)	103 (39)	100 (38)	96 (36)	93 (34)	83 (28)	76 (24)	102 (39)
Mean maximum °F (°C)	59.9 (15.5)	62.3 (16.8)	72.5 (22.5)	83.2 (28.4)	88.8 (31.6)	92.5 (33.6)	95.2 (35.1)	93.9 (34.4)	89.4 (31.9)	81.4 (27.4)	71.8 (22.1)	61.0 (16.1)	96.1 (35.6)
Mean daily maximum °F (°C)	38.1 (3.4)	41.0 (5.0)	49.5 (9.7)	62.2 (16.8)	71.9 (22.2)	80.9 (27.2)	85.5 (29.7)	83.8 (28.8)	76.8 (24.9)	64.9 (18.3)	53.0 (11.7)	42.5 (5.8)	62.5 (16.9)
Daily mean °F (°C)	29.8 (−1.2)	32.1 (0.1)	39.9 (4.4)	51.5 (10.8)	61.5 (16.4)	70.5 (21.4)	75.2 (24.0)	73.4 (23.0)	66.3 (19.1)	54.5 (12.5)	43.7 (6.5)	34.7 (1.5)	52.8 (11.6)
Mean daily minimum °F (°C)	21.6 (−5.8)	23.2 (−4.9)	30.3 (−0.9)	40.7 (4.8)	51.1 (10.6)	60.1 (15.6)	64.9 (18.3)	63.1 (17.3)	55.7 (13.2)	44.1 (6.7)	34.5 (1.4)	26.8 (−2.9)	43.0 (6.1)
Mean minimum °F (°C)	4.8 (−15.1)	7.3 (−13.7)	13.8 (−10.1)	27.3 (−2.6)	36.4 (2.4)	47.0 (8.3)	53.9 (12.2)	52.4 (11.3)	41.9 (5.5)	30.3 (−0.9)	20.4 (−6.4)	12.1 (−11.1)	2.0 (−16.7)
Record low °F (°C)	−18 (−28)	−9 (−23)	−2 (−19)	13 (−11)	28 (−2)	36 (2)	46 (8)	38 (3)	32 (0)	20 (−7)	8 (−13)	−8 (−22)	−18 (−28)
Average precipitation inches (mm)	3.47 (88)	2.61 (66)	3.62 (92)	3.91 (99)	4.42 (112)	4.16 (106)	3.64 (92)	3.70 (94)	5.24 (133)	3.90 (99)	3.21 (82)	3.44 (87)	45.32 (1,151)
Average snowfall inches (cm)	8.7 (22)	8.7 (22)	5.1 (13)	0.3 (0.76)	0.0 (0.0)	0.0 (0.0)	0.0 (0.0)	0.0 (0.0)	0.0 (0.0)	0.2 (0.51)	0.4 (1.0)	3.6 (9.1)	27.0 (69)
Average precipitation days (≥ 0.01 in)	10.3	9.1	10.0	11.8	13.3	10.8	10.7	9.4	9.5	9.4	8.7	9.9	122.9
Average snowy days (≥ 0.1 in)	3.9	3.6	2.1	0.3	0.0	0.0	0.0	0.0	0.0	0.0	0.2	1.9	12.0
Source: NOAA

== Demographics ==
Historical population
Census	Pop.	Note	%±
1910	386		—
1920	539		39.6%
1930	659		22.3%
1940	723		9.7%
1950	870		20.3%
1960	923		6.1%
1970	977		5.9%
1980	991		1.4%
1990	993		0.2%
2000	1,101		10.9%
2010	1,200		9.0%
2020	1,225		2.1%

As of the census of 2000, there were 1,101 people, 443 households, and 299 families residing in the borough. The population density was 1,725.3 inhabitants per square mile (666.1/km^{2}). There were 460 housing units at an average density of 720.8 per square mile (278.3/km^{2}). The racial makeup of the borough was 93.55% White, 0.82% African American, 0.18% Asian, 3.91% from other races, and 1.54% from two or more races.

There were 443 households, out of which 31.4% had children under the age of 18 living with them, 53.0% were married couples living together, 9.7% had a female householder with no husband present, and 32.3% were non-families. 25.3% of all households were made up of individuals, and 13.1% had someone living alone who was 65 years of age or older. The average household size was 2.49 and the average family size was 3.00.

In the borough, the population was spread out, with 24.7% under the age of 18, 7.6% from 18 to 24, 28.2% from 25 to 44, 22.7% from 45 to 64, and 16.7% who were 65 years of age or older. The median age was 38 years. For every 100 females there were 103.1 males. For every 100 females age 18 and over, there were 94.6 males.

The median income for a household in the borough was $39,861, and the median income for a family was $43,750. Males had a median income of $30,813 versus $22,938 for females. The per capita income for the borough was $18,142. About 7.9% of families and 9.2% of the population were below the poverty line, including 9.1% of those under age 18 and 20.6% of those age 65 or over.

== Education ==
It is in the Upper Adams School District.
