= Bendersville, Pennsylvania =

Borough in Pennsylvania, United States

- Borough
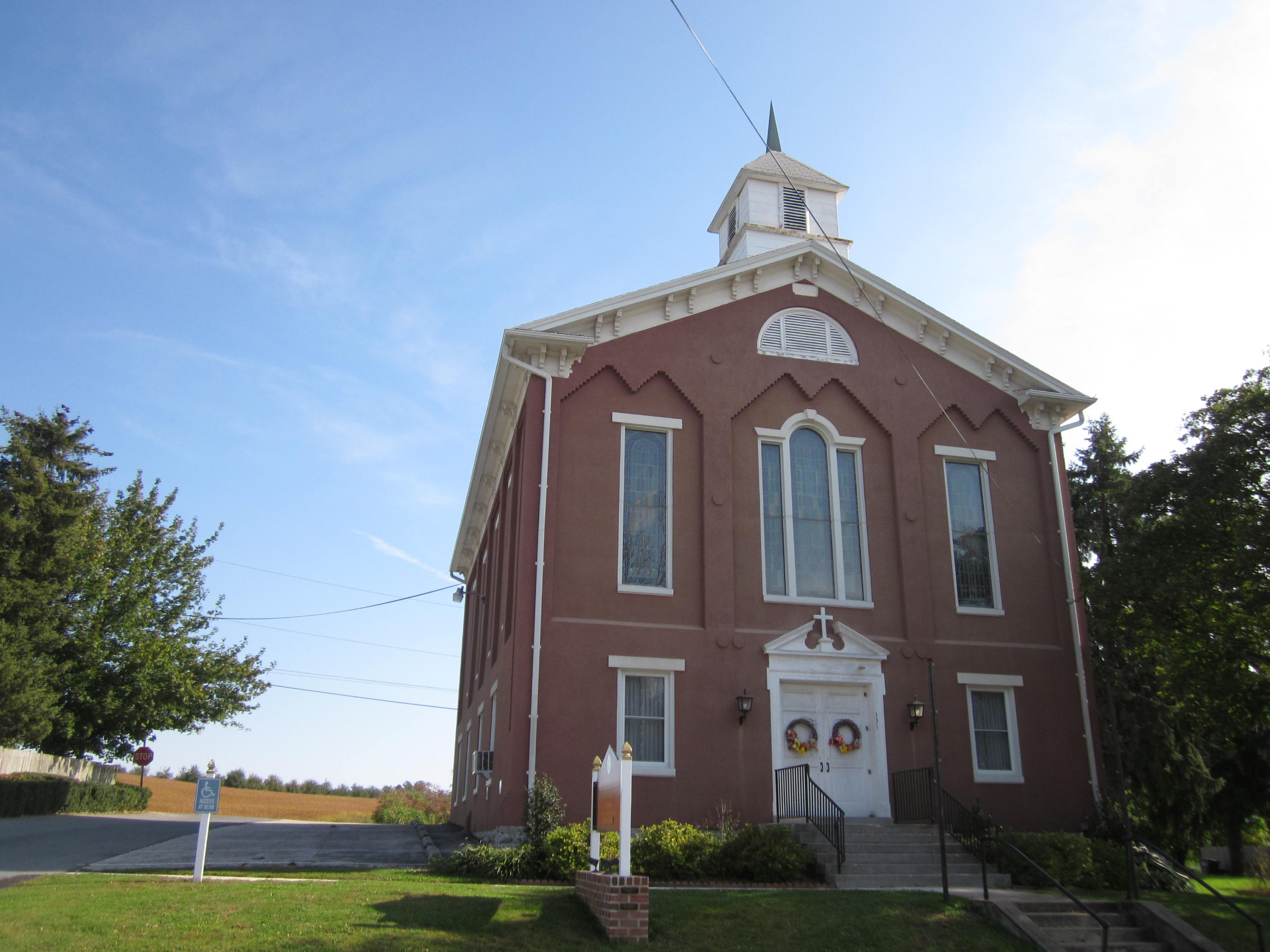
- Bendersville, Pennsylvania

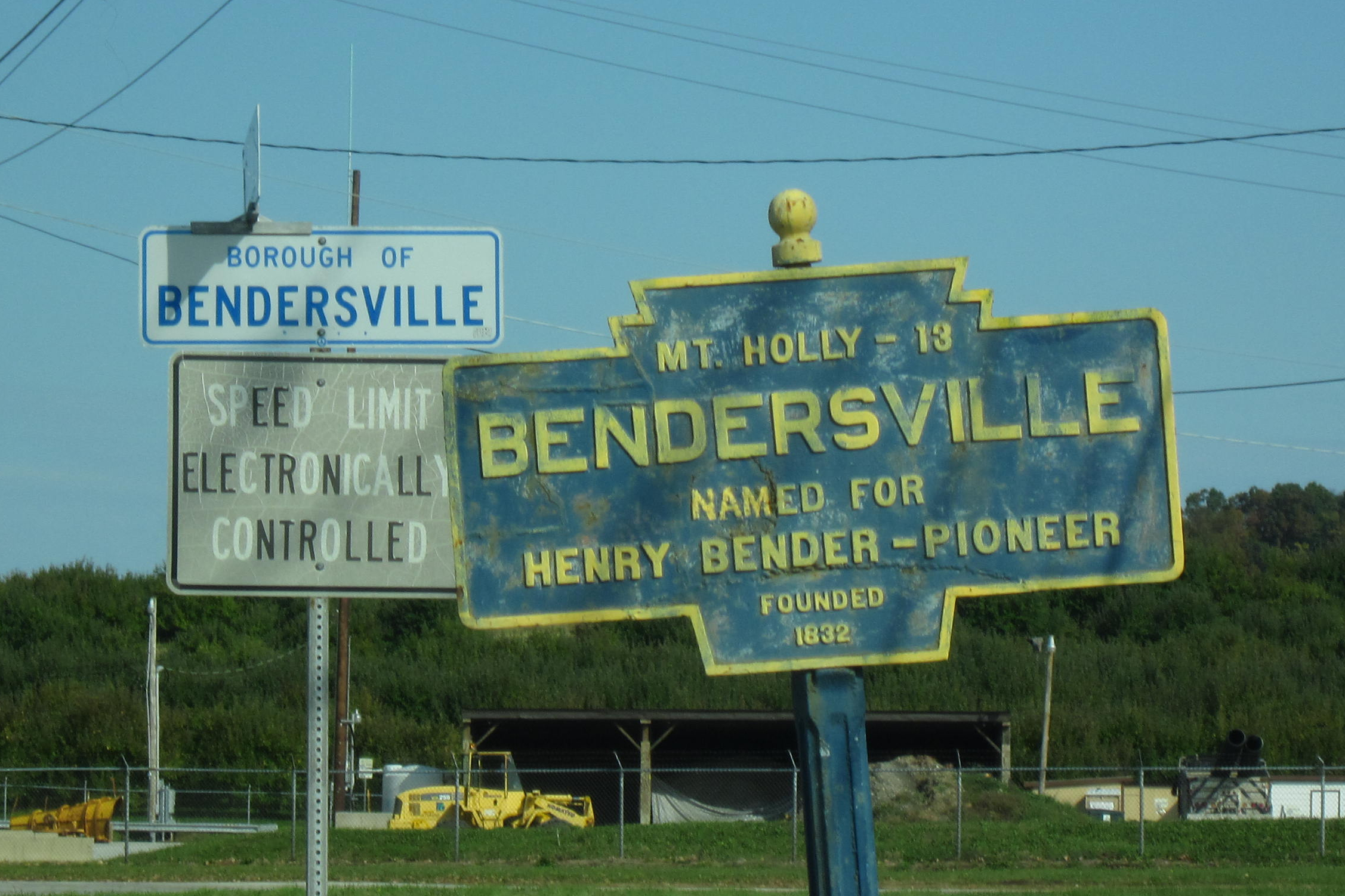
- Seal Keystone Marker

- Location in Adams County and the U.S. state of Pennsylvania.

- Location in Pennsylvania and the United States Bendersville (the United States)
- Coordinates: 39°58′57″N 77°14′59″W
- Country: United States
- State: Pennsylvania
- County: Adams
- Settled: 1811
- Incorporated: 1866

Government
  - Type: Borough Council

Area
  - Total: 0.45 sq mi (1.17 km^{2})
  - Land: 0.45 sq mi (1.17 km^{2})
  - Water: 0 sq mi (0.00 km^{2})
- Elevation: 705 ft (215 m)

Population (2020)
  - Total: 736
  - Density: 1,629.6/sq mi (629.18/km^{2})
- Time zone: UTC-5 (Eastern (EST))
  - Summer (DST): UTC-4 (EDT)
- Zip Code: 17306
- Area code: 717
- FIPS code: 42-05536
- Website: http://www.bendersvilleborough.net/

Bendersville is a borough in Adams County, Pennsylvania, United States. The population was 736 at the 2020 census.

== Geography ==
Bendersville is located at 39°58′57″N 77°14′59″W (39.982466, -77.249608). According to the U.S. Census Bureau, the borough has a total area of 0.4 square miles (1.0 km^{2}), all land.

== Demographics ==
Historical population
Census	Pop.	Note	%±
1880	331		—
1890	370		11.8%
1900	342		−7.6%
1910	355		3.8%
1920	356		0.3%
1930	384		7.9%
1940	414		7.8%
1950	409		−1.2%
1960	484		18.3%
1970	528		9.1%
1980	533		0.9%
1990	560		5.1%
2000	576		2.9%
2010	641		11.3%
2020	736		14.8%

As of the census of 2000, there were 576 people, 202 households, and 156 families residing in the borough. The population density was 1,391.9 inhabitants per square mile (537.4/km^{2}). There were 222 housing units at an average density of 536.5 per square mile (207.1/km^{2}). The racial makeup of the borough was 90.62% White, 2.26% African American, 0.17% Native American, 0.17% Asian, 5.90% from other races, and 0.87% from two or more races. Hispanic or Latino of any race were 12.67% of the population.

There were 202 households, out of which 38.6% had children under the age of 18 living with them, 64.9% were married couples living together, 9.4% had a female householder with no husband present, and 22.3% were non-families. 17.3% of all households were made up of individuals, and 10.4% had someone living alone who was 65 years of age or older. The average household size was 2.85 and the average family size was 3.21.

In the borough, the population was spread out, with 27.8% under the age of 18, 11.3% from 18 to 24, 28.3% from 25 to 44, 19.6% from 45 to 64, and 13.0% who were 65 years of age or older. The median age was 33 years. For every 100 females there were 92.6 males. For every 100 females age 18 and over, there were 96.2 males.

The median income for a household in the borough was $39,688, and the median income for a family was $41,250. Males had a median income of $30,000 versus $20,417 for females. The per capita income for the borough was $15,066. About 7.5% of families and 9.6% of the population were below the poverty line, including 15.4% of those under age 18 and 5.2% of those age 65 or over.

Mayor of Bendersville is Leon Stoner

== Education ==
It is in the Upper Adams School District.

== See also ==
- Bendersville station
