= Tyrone Township, Adams County, Pennsylvania =

Township in Pennsylvania, US

Coordinates: 39°57′54″N 77°10′10″W

- Township
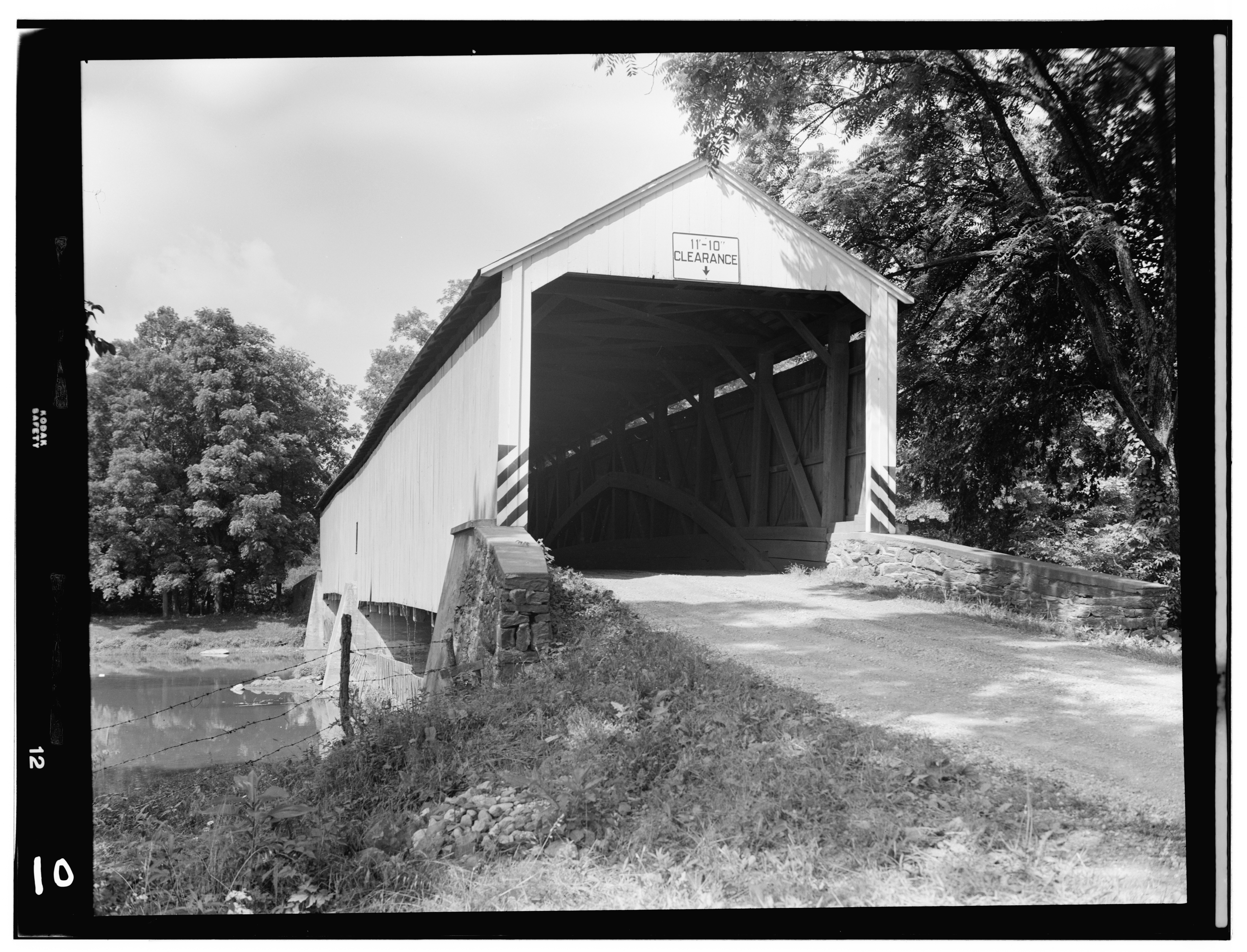
- Snyder's Fording Covered Bridge

- Seal

- Location in Adams County and the state of Pennsylvania.
- Country: United States
- State: Pennsylvania
- County: Adams
- Settled: 1749
- Incorporated: 1749

Area
  - Total: 21.56 sq mi (55.85 km^{2})
  - Land: 21.48 sq mi (55.62 km^{2})
  - Water: 0.089 sq mi (0.23 km^{2})

Population (2010)
  - Total: 2,298
  - Estimate (2016): 2,293
  - Density: 106.8/sq mi (41.22/km^{2})
- Time zone: UTC-5 (Eastern (EST))
  - Summer (DST): UTC-4 (EDT)
- Area code: 717
- FIPS code: 42-001-78160
- Website: https://tyrone.adamscountypa.gov/

Tyrone Township is a township that is located in Adams County, Pennsylvania, United States. The population was 2,298 at the time of the 2010 census.

It was named after County Tyrone in Ireland.

== Geography ==
According to the United States Census Bureau, the township has a total area of 21.6 square miles (55.9 km^{2}), of which 21.5 square miles (55.6 km^{2}) is land and 0.077 square miles (0.2 km^{2}), or 0.41%, is water. It contains part of the census-designated place of Gardners and the entirety of Heidlersburg.

== Recreation ==
A portion of the Pennsylvania State Game Lands Number 249 is located in Tyrone Township.

== Demographics ==
Historical population
Census	Pop.	Note	%±
2000	2,273		—
2010	2,298		1.1%
2016 (est.)	2,293		−0.2%
U.S. Decennial Census

As of the census of 2000, there were 2,273 people, 785 households, and 616 families residing in the township. The population density was 105.9 inhabitants per square mile (40.9/km^{2}). There were 835 housing units at an average density of 38.9 per square mile (15.0/km^{2}). The racial makeup of the township was 94.81% White, 1.28% African American, 0.40% Native American, 0.35% Asian, 1.94% from other races, and 1.23% from two or more races. Hispanic or Latino of any race were 5.06% of the population.

There were 785 households, out of which 37.6% had children under the age of 18 living with them, 67.9% were married couples living together, 6.5% had a female householder with no husband present, and 21.5% were non-families. 15.0% of all households were made up of individuals, and 3.9% had someone living alone who was 65 years of age or older. The average household size was 2.88 and the average family size was 3.22.

In the township the population was spread out, with 28.1% under the age of 18, 8.1% from 18 to 24, 31.5% from 25 to 44, 23.0% from 45 to 64, and 9.4% who were 65 years of age or older. The median age was 35 years. For every 100 females there were 106.6 males. For every 100 females age 18 and over, there were 106.1 males.

The median income for a household in the township was $43,523, and the median income for a family was $45,962. Males had a median income of $30,102 versus $22,250 for females. The per capita income for the township was $16,456. About 5.9% of families and 7.8% of the population were below the poverty line, including 9.7% of those under age 18 and 10.5% of those age 65 or over.
