= Cashtown-McKnightstown, Pennsylvania =

Cashtown-McKnightstown
- CDP
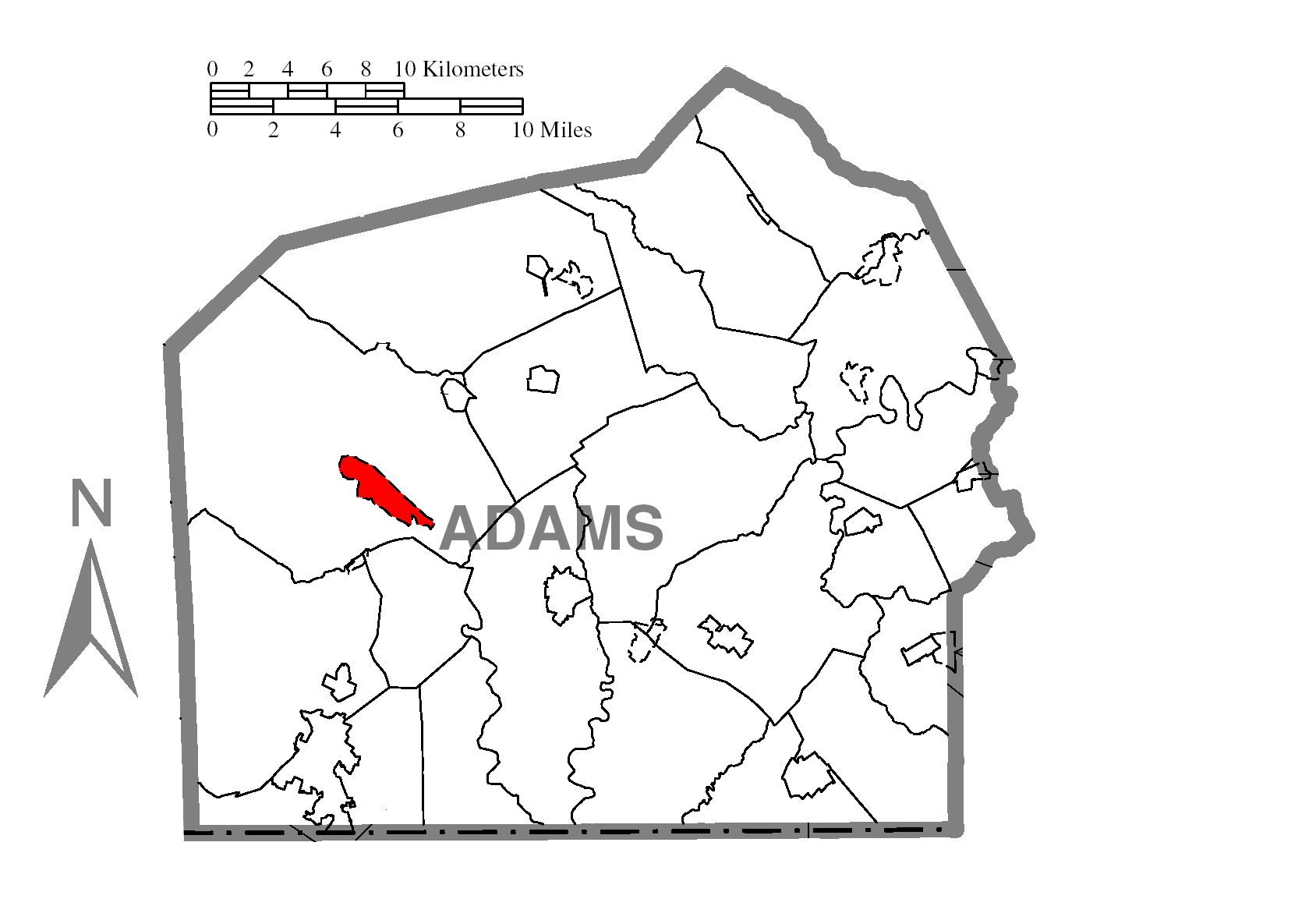
- Location within Adams County

- Location within the U.S. state of Pennsylvania Cashtown-McKnightstown (the United States)
- Coordinates: 39°52′33″N 77°20′17″W
- Country: United States
- State: Pennsylvania
- County: Adams

Area
  - Total: 2.4 sq mi (6.2 km^{2})
  - Land: 2.4 sq mi (6.2 km^{2})

Population (2010)
  - Total: 685
  - Density: 290/sq mi (110/km^{2})
- Time zone: UTC-5 (Eastern (EST))
  - Summer (DST): UTC-4 (EDT)
- ZIP codes: 17353, 17310, 17343, 17307

Cashtown-McKnightstown was a census-designated place (CDP) in Franklin Township, Adams County, Pennsylvania. It was the 2000 United States census area designated by obsolete Census Code 11588 and has been replaced by the CDPs of Cashtown and McKnightstown, which the USGS designated as separate named places on August 30, 2010.

== Geography ==
Cashtown-McKnightstown is located at 39°52′33″N 77°20′17″W (39.875934, -77.338137).

According to the United States Census Bureau, the CDP has a total area of 2.4 square miles (6.2 km^{2}), all of it land.

== History ==
In 1863 during the Civil War, General Robert E. Lee and the Army of Northern Virginia passed through Cashtown on its way to Gettysburg, and a few generals made their headquarters at the Cashtown Inn during the battle. After Lee's failure to defeat General Meade and the Army of the Potomac at the Battle of Gettysburg (July 1–3), Lee once again passed through Cashtown during the early morning hours of July 4, 1863 in heavy rain in his retreat to Virginia.

== Demographics ==
As of the census of 2000, there were 753 people, 289 households, and 223 families residing in the CDP. The population density was 315.9 inhabitants per square mile (122.0/km^{2}). There were 300 housing units at an average density of 125.9 per square mile (48.6/km^{2}). The racial makeup of the CDP was 95.75% White, 1.73% African American, 0.93% from other races, and 1.59% from two or more races. Hispanic or Latino of any race were 0.93% of the population.

There were 289 households, out of which 30.1% had children under the age of 18 living with them, 65.7% were married couples living together, 9.3% had a female householder with no husband present, and 22.8% were non-families. 20.8% of all households were made up of individuals, and 10.4% had someone living alone who was 65 years of age or older. The average household size was 2.61 and the average family size was 3.03.

In the CDP, the population was spread out, with 24.4% under the age of 18, 6.4% from 18 to 24, 27.5% from 25 to 44, 27.4% from 45 to 64, and 14.3% who were 65 years of age or older. The median age was 40 years. For every 100 females, there were 93.1 males. For every 100 females age 18 and over, there were 92.9 males.

The median income for a household in the CDP was $45,882, and the median income for a family was $49,732. Males had a median income of $35,382 versus $18,864 for females. The per capita income for the CDP was $19,105. None of the families and 0.9% of the population were living below the poverty line, including no under eighteens and 6.9% of those over 64.

== Education ==
The former CDP is in the Gettysburg Area School District. The district's comprehensive middle and high schools are Gettysburg Area Middle School and Gettysburg Area High School.

Franklin Township Elementary School has an Orrtanna post office address, but is physically in the Cashtown CDP. This is the zoned school for Cashtown and McKnightstown. The district's comprehensive middle and high schools are Gettysburg Area Middle School and Gettysburg Area High School.

== Notable natives ==
- Cheston Lee Eshelman
- William Addison Duncan
