= Pennsylvania House of Representatives, District 91 =

American legislative district

Pennsylvania's 91st State House of Representatives district
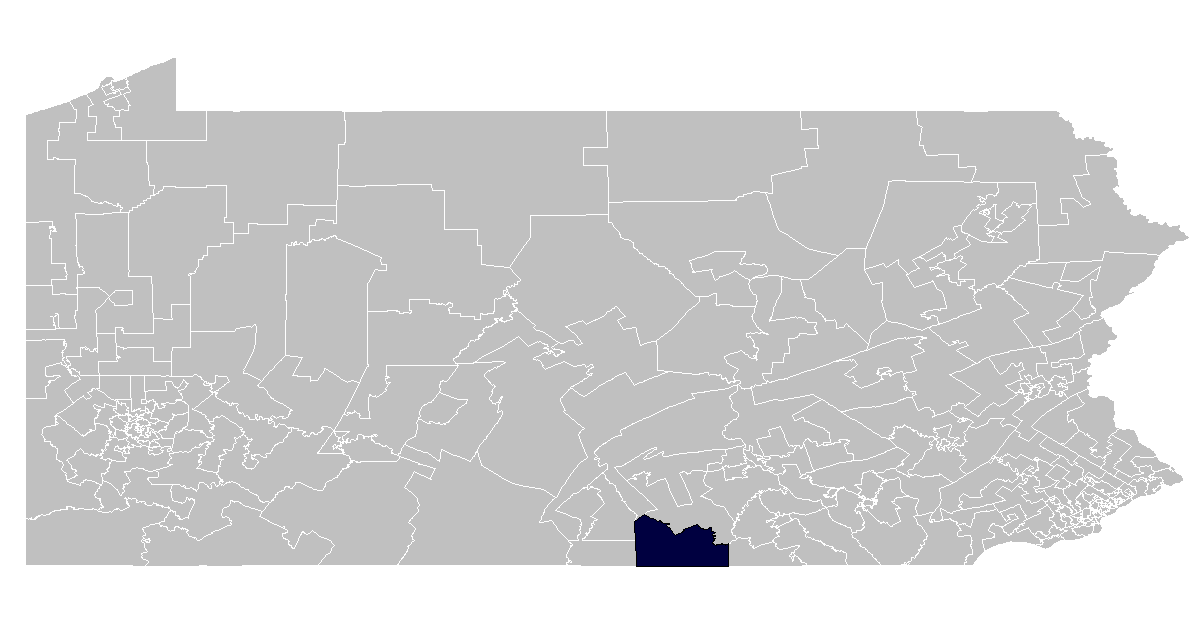
Representative
Dan Moul; R–Conewago Township
- Population (2022): 65,612

The 91st Pennsylvania House of Representatives District is located in South Central Pennsylvania and has been represented by Dan Moul since 2007.

== District profile ==
The 91st District is located in Adams County and includes the following areas:

- Bonneauville
- Carroll Valley
- Conewago Township
- Cumberland Township
- Fairfield
- Franklin Township
- Freedom Township
- Germany Township
- Gettysburg
- Hamiltonban Township
- Highland Township
- Liberty Township
- Littlestown
- McSherrystown
- Mount Joy Township
- Mount Pleasant Township
- Straban Township
- Union Township

== Representatives ==
Representative	Party	Years	District home	Note
Prior to 1969, seats were apportioned by county.
Francis Worley	Republican	1969 – 1970		
Fred G. Klunk	Democrat	1971 – 1972		
Clark S. Smith	Republican	1973 – 1974		
Kenneth J. Cole	Democrat	1975 – 1994		
Stephen R. Maitland	Republican	1995 – 2006		
Dan Moul	Republican	2007 – present	Conewago Township	Incumbent
