= Cashtown (disambiguation) =

Cashtown may refer to the following places:

- Cashtown, Pennsylvania, a census-designated place in Adams County
- Cashtown, Franklin County, Pennsylvania, an unincorporated community
- Cashtown Inn, an inn near Gettysburg, Pennsylvania
- Cashtown Corners, part of Clearview, Ontario
