= Gettysburg Area High School =

Location
- 1130 Old Harrisburg Road; Gettysburg address, Adams County, Pennsylvania 17325-8548; United States

Information
- Type: Public
- Motto: A Great Place to Learn
- School number: (717) 334-6254
- Principal: Jeremy Lusk
- Teaching staff: 74.06 (FTE)
- Enrollment: 1,069 (2024-2025)
- Student to teacher ratio: 14.43
- Campus type: Rural
- Colors: Maroon; White
- Mascot: Warriors
- Website: Gettysburg Area High School

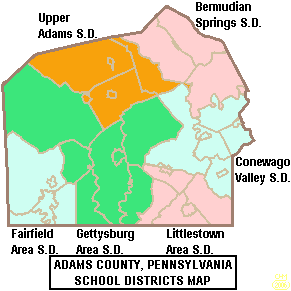
Map of Adams County, Pennsylvania school districts

Gettysburg Area High School is a public high school located in Straban Township, Pennsylvania, United States, with a Gettysburg postal address. It serves students from central, southern, and western Adams County, and is the sole high school operated by the Gettysburg Area School District. Gettysburg Area High School is located at 1130 Old Harrisburg Road, Gettysburg postal address, PA 17325. In 2016, enrollment was reported as 1067 pupils in 9th through 12th grades.

The district includes: Gettysburg Borough, as well as Cumberland, Freedom, Highland, Franklin and parts of Mt. Joy and Straban Townships. The district also includes the census-designated places of Cashtown, Hunterstown, and McKnightstown, as well as most of the Lake Heritage CDP and a portion of the Orrtanna CDP.

== Extracurriculars ==
The Gettysburg Area School District offers a variety of clubs and activities, and an extensive sports program. The school offers a JROTC program and a Technology Student Association (TSA) chapter, both of which are award-winning.

=== Sports ===
The district funds:

Varsity

- Boys:
  - Baseball - AAAAA
  - Basketball- AAAAA
  - Cross country - AA
  - Football - AAAA
  - Golf - AAA
  - Soccer - AAA
  - Swimming and diving - AA
  - Tennis - AAA
  - Track and field - AAA
  - Wrestling - AAA
- Girls:
  - Basketball - AAAAA
  - Cheer - AAAAAA
  - Cross country - AA
  - Field hockey - AA
  - Golf - AAA
  - Soccer (fall) - AAA
  - Softball - AAAAA
  - Swimming and diving - AA
  - Tennis - AAA
  - Track and field - AAA
  - Volleyball - AAA

== Notable alumni ==
- Butch Alberts, Class of 1968. Played baseball and football at the University of Cincinnati. Was a professional baseball player, making it to the major leagues for six games with the Toronto Blue Jays in 1978.
- Steve Courson, Class of 1973. Played college football at the University of South Carolina, before having an eight-year NFL career. Won two Super Bowls with the Pittsburgh Steelers. Only football player in Gettysburg history to have his number retired.
- Dawn Keefer, Class of 1991, representing the 92nd District in the Pennsylvania House of Representatives
- Eric Rosenbach, Class of 1991. Retired U.S. Army captain who served as Pentagon Chief of Staff from July 2015 to January 2017 and as Assistant Secretary of Defense for Homeland Defense and Global Security from September 2014 to September 2015
- Brandon Streeter, Class of 1995. Started at quarterback for two years at Clemson University. Currently the offensive coordinator and quarterbacks coach at Clemson.

== See also ==
- High schools in Pennsylvania
