= Carbaugh Run Rhyolite Quarry Site =

- Carbaugh Run Rhyolite Quarry Site (36AD30)
- U.S. National Register of Historic Places
- Location within Pennsylvania Location within the United States
- Location: On top of Snaggy Ridge, west of Carbaugh Run, in Franklin Township, Adams County, Pennsylvania
- Nearest city: Cashtown
- Coordinates: 39°53′2.4″N 77°27′26.4″W
- Area: 101 acres (41 ha)
- NRHP reference No.: 86000817
- Added to NRHP: January 15, 1986

The Carbaugh Run Rhyolite Quarry Site is an archaeological site in Franklin Township, Adams County, Pennsylvania, United States. It is composed of two smaller sites: a group of small quarries on top of Snaggy Ridge, and the remnants of what may have been a campsite along Carbaugh Run below the ridge.

Since their discovery by Norman Keefer in the 1920s, the quarries have been examined informally by a wide range of archaeologists, but no formal study of the site has been conducted. Several other prehistoric quarries are located in the area; it is one of three known quarries along South Mountain alone. The site has been rated as one of Pennsylvania's leading rhyolite quarries: with forty or more pits, it is one of the largest rhyolite quarry sites in the state. It is believed that the stone still present at the site can be used to determine the origins of rhyolite found in other sites statewide, thus providing clues about trade networks during the period that the quarries were worked. Also significant is the potential connection between the quarries and the streamside site, which may reveal evidence of settlement patterns in the region.

In 1986, the Carbaugh Run Rhyolite Quarry Site was listed on the National Register of Historic Places for its archaeological significance.
