= Stephen Maitland =

American politician

Stephen R. Maitland

Member of the Pennsylvania House of Representatives from the 91st district
- In office January 5, 1993 – November 30, 2006
- Preceded by: Kenneth J. Cole
- Succeeded by: Dan Moul

Personal details
- Born: August 19, 1962 (age 64) Arlington, Virginia
- Party: Republican
- Spouse: Melinda Keller Maitland
- Children: Elizabeth, Sarah, Emily

Stephen R. Maitland (born August 19, 1962) is a former Republican member of the Pennsylvania House of Representatives.

== Biography ==
Maitland is a 1980 graduate of Gettysburg Senior High School. He earned a degree in political science from Mount St. Mary's University in 1991. He then attended M.A. classes in the Science, Technology and Public Policy program at the Elliott School of International Affairs at George Washington University, and subsequently earned his Juris Doctor degree from Widener University Commonwealth Law School in December, 2006.

After working as the development officer for the Army Heritage Center Foundation in Carlisle, Pennsylvania, he went on to practice law in a solo general practice, specializing in the criminal defense of offenders with mental illness.

He was first elected to represent the 91st legislative district in the Pennsylvania House of Representatives in 1992. He was defeated for re-election in 2006.

In 2012, he moved with his family to suburban Atlanta, where he works as a business consultant in life sciences and data industries, and also serves as an attorney to local businesses.
