= Nellie V. Mark =

American physician, suffragist

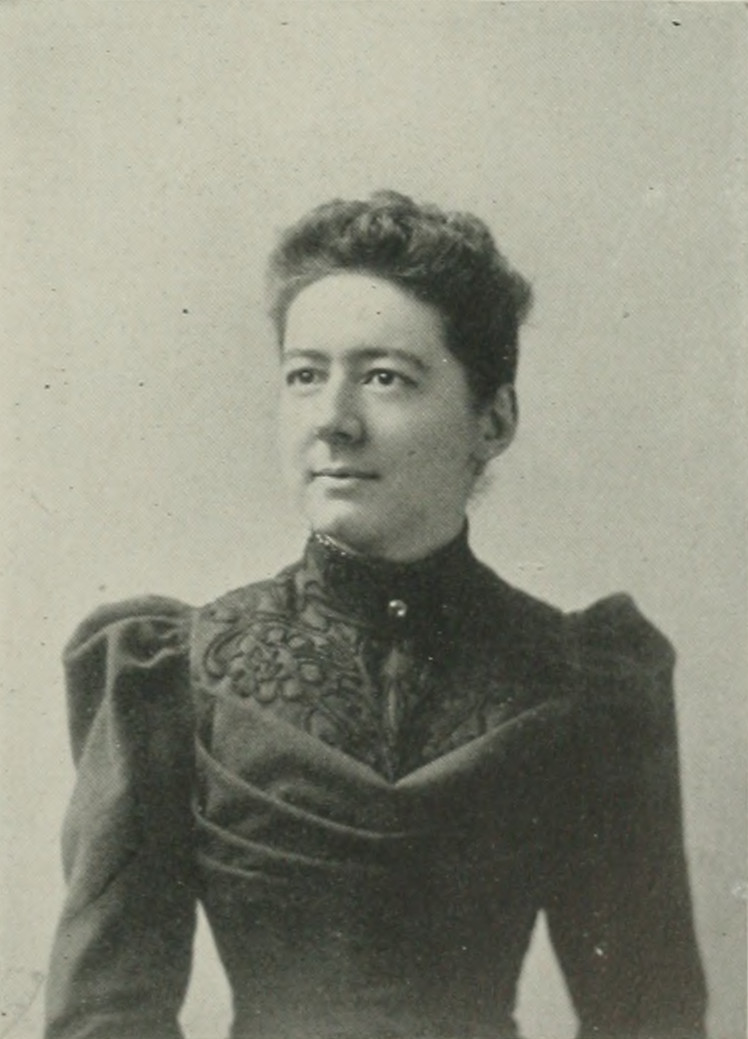
- Nellie V. Mark, "A woman of the century"
- Born: July 21, 1857; Cashtown, Pennsylvania
- Died: December 3, 1935 (aged 78); Los Angeles, California
- Education: Maryland College for Women, Boston University School of Medicine
- Occupation: Physician

Nellie V. Mark (July 21, 1857 – December 3, 1935) was an American physician and suffragist. In addition to looking after her medical practice, she lectured on personal hygiene, literary topics, and on woman suffrage. Mark served as vice-president of the Association for the Advancement of Women. She was a member of Just Government League of Baltimore, the Equal Suffrage League of Baltimore, the National Geographic Society, and the Arundell Club of Baltimore. Mark could not remember a time when she was not a suffragist and a doctor.

== Early years and education ==
Nellie Virginia Mark was born in Cashtown, Pennsylvania, near Gettysburg, Pennsylvania, July 21, 1857. Her parents were Jacob and Mary (Cover) Mark.

In July 1875, Mark graduated from the Maryland College for Women in Lutherville, Maryland. In 1883 she returned to make an address before the alumni on "Woman Suffrage and its Workers." Three years later, she delivered another on "Woman in the Medical Profession," which the faculty had printed in pamphlet form for distribution, and she was elected president of the Alumni Association.

After her graduation, she studied under the professors in Gettysburg for several years, during which time she was under allopathic treatment in that place and in Baltimore for inherited rheumatism, which affected her eyes. Experiencing no improvement, she tried homeopathy in Philadelphia, and, being benefited, read medicine with her physician, Dr. Anna M. Marshall, for about a year. In 1881, Mark began a course of study in the Boston University School of Medicine, and was graduated in 1884.

== Career ==
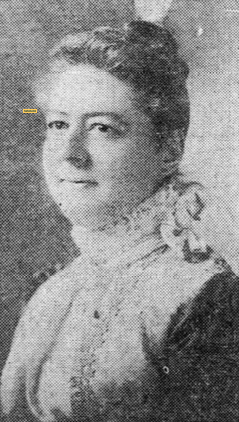
Nellie Mark, 1910

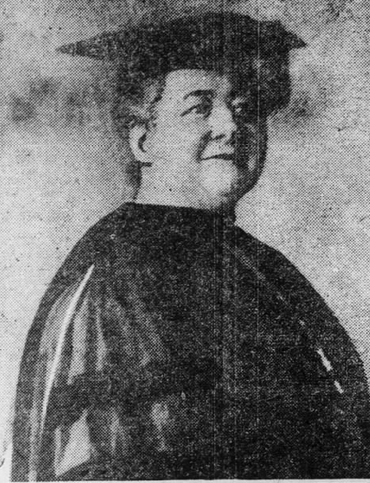
Nellie Mark, 1919

She settled in Baltimore and has built up a large and remunerative practice. In addition to her practice, she kept busy with addresses and discussions in medical and suffragist conventions. She gave health lectures to working women's clubs. She served as superintendent of the scientific instruction department of the Baltimore Woman's Christian Temperance Union (WCTU). She held the position of director for Maryland, and auditor, in the Association for the Advancement of Women. In the meeting of that society in Detroit, in 1887, she read a paper on "Women as Guardians of the Public Health." She also read a paper on "La Grippe" in the meeting of 1892, in Grand Rapids, Michigan, and was on the programme in November 1892, in Memphis, Tennessee, for one on "The Effect of Immigration on the Health of the Nation." During the Woman suffrage parade of 1913 of March 3, 1913, she served as marshal of the professional women of Maryland in the Maryland portion of the parade.

== Personal life and legacy ==
Mark attended as her physician and also entertained Julia Ward Howe. She also entertained Rev. Antoinette Brown Blackwell, Lucy Stone Blackwell, Dr. Anna Howard Shaw, Susan B. Anthony, Henrietta T. Wolcott, and Julia Marlowe. Mark died in Los Angeles, California, December 3, 1935, and was interred at Flohr's Lutheran Cemetery, near McKnightstown, Pennsylvania. Marks bequeathed her collections of Native America pottery, blankets, wall panels, and relics to the Enoch Pratt Free Library and the Maryland Academy of Sciences, named "The Nellie V. Mark Collections".
