= Beaverdam Creek (Conewago Creek tributary) =

Stream in Pennsylvania, United States

Beaverdam Creek (Conewago Creek)

Location
- Country: United States
- State: Pennsylvania
- County: Adams

Physical characteristics
- Source
  - location: near Granite Station
  - coordinates: 39.8637074°N 77.1602606°W
- Mouth: Conewago Creek (west)
  - coordinates: 39.9012072°N 77.1163705°W
  - elevation: 484 ft (148 m)

Beaverdam Creek is a Pennsylvania stream near Hunterstown, northeast of Gettysburg, Pennsylvania. The creek's intersection with the road leading to the Gettysburg Railroad's Granite station was the site of the Battle of Hunterstown on July 2, 1863.
