= Lower Marsh Creek Presbyterian Church =

Historic church in Pennsylvania, United States

- U.S. National Register of Historic Places
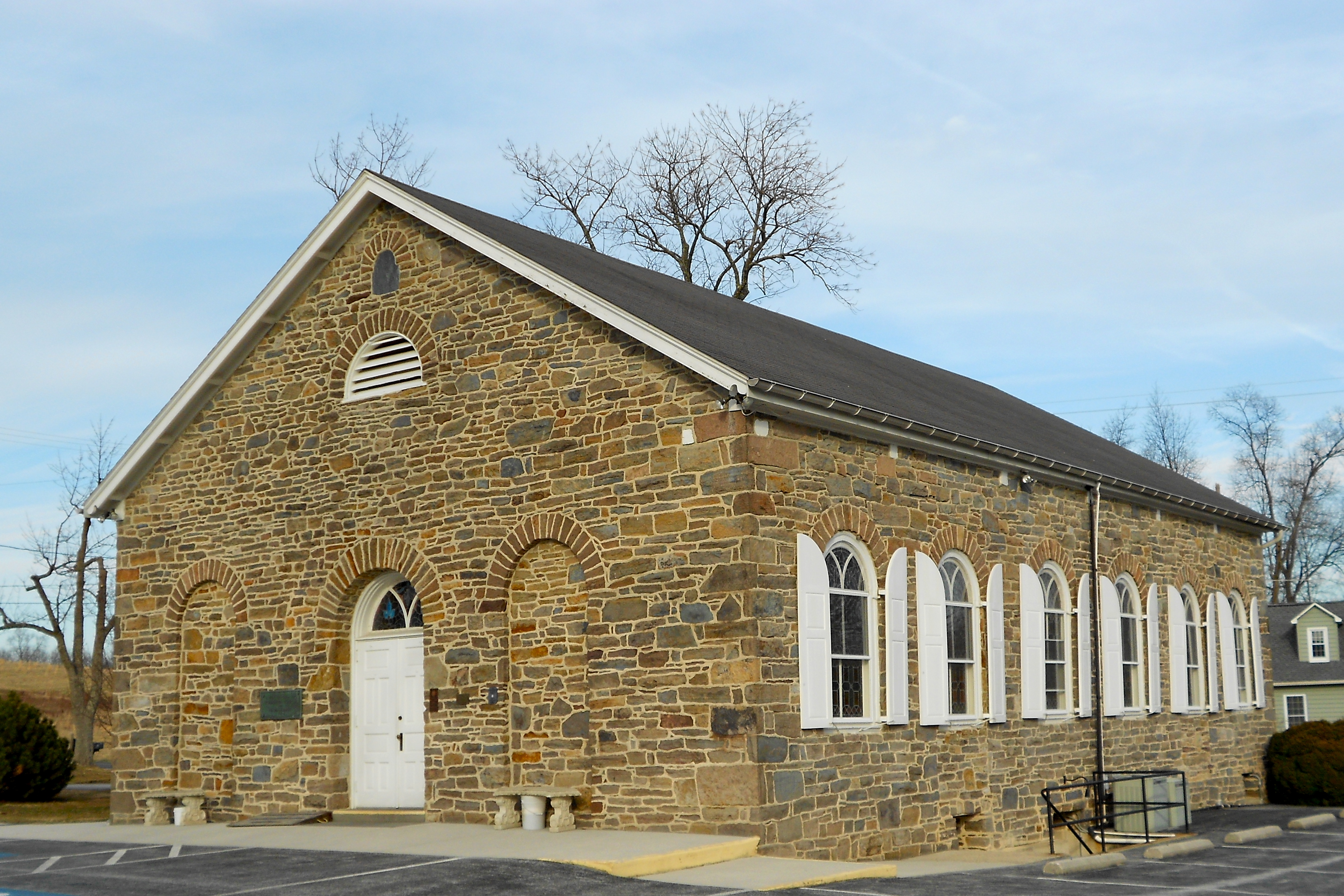
- Lower Marsh Creek Presbyterian Church, February 2012

- Location within Pennsylvania Location within the United States
- Nearest city: Southeast of Orrtanna on Legislative Route 01002, Highland Township, Pennsylvania
- Coordinates: 39°48′42″N 77°19′59″W
- Area: 3.3 acres (1.3 ha)
- Built: 1790
- Architectural style: Regional ecclesiastical
- NRHP reference No.: 80003399
- Added to NRHP: October 15, 1980

The Lower Marsh Creek Presbyterian Church is an historic Presbyterian church which is located near Orrtanna, Highland Township, Adams County, Pennsylvania, United States.

It was listed on the National Register of Historic Places in 1980.

== History and architectural features ==
Built in 1790, this historic church building is a three-bay wide and six-bay deep, rectangular, rubble fieldstone building, which features a semi-circular opening set in the front gable over the main entrance.

It was listed on the National Register of Historic Places in 1980.
