= Hunterstown Historic District =

Area in Pennsylvania, US

- U.S. National Register of Historic Places
- U.S. Historic district
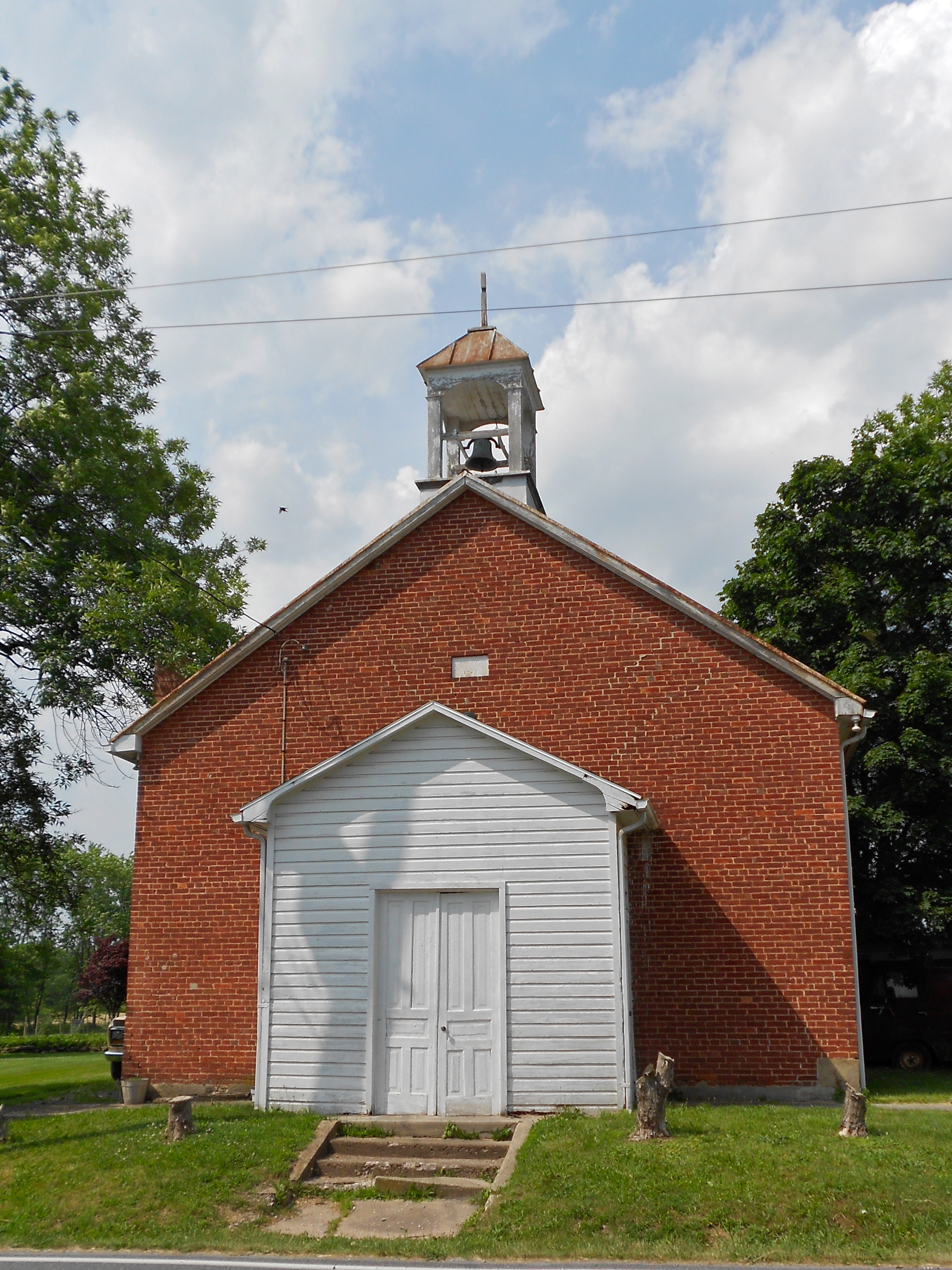
- Methodist Episcopal Church, built 1879

- Location within Pennsylvania Location within the United States
- Location: Pennsylvania Route 394 and Granite Station Road, in Hunterstown, Straban Township, Pennsylvania
- Coordinates: 39°53′03″N 77°09′36″W
- Area: 60 acres (24 ha)
- Architectural style: Early 19th-century vernacular
- NRHP reference No.: 79002154
- Added to NRHP: May 15, 1979

The Hunterstown Historic District is a national historic district which is located in Hunterstown, Straban Township in Adams County, Pennsylvania, United States.

It was listed on the National Register of Historic Places in 1979.

== History and architectural features ==
This historic district includes forty-eight contributing buildings within the original perimeters of Hunterstown. They primarily date from the late eighteenth to the mid-nineteenth century and consist of log, frame, and brick residential buildings and a farm complex. Also located in the district is the separately listed Great Conewago Presbyterian Church.

It was listed on the National Register of Historic Places in 1979.
