= Quadir Copeland =

American basketball player (born 2003)

No. 25 – Houston Rockets
- Position: Point guard
- League: NBA

Personal information
- Born: September 4, 2003 (age 23) Philadelphia, Pennsylvania, U.S.
- Listed height: 6 ft 5 in (1.96 m)
- Listed weight: 214 lb (97 kg)

Career information
- High school: Gettysburg (Gettysburg, Pennsylvania); Life Center Academy (Burlington, New Jersey); IMG Academy (Bradenton, Florida)
- College: Syracuse (2022–2024); McNeese (2024–2025); NC State (2025–2026)
- NBA draft: 2026: undrafted
- Playing career: 2026–present

Career history
- 2026–present: Houston Rockets
- 2026–present: →Rio Grande Valley Vipers

Career highlights
- Third-team All-ACC (2026); Second-team All-Southland (2025)
- Stats at NBA.com
- Stats at Basketball Reference

Quadir Shaquan Copeland (born September 4, 2003) is an American professional basketball player for the Houston Rockets of the National Basketball Association (NBA), on a two-way contract with the Rio Grande Valley Vipers of the NBA G League. He played college basketball for the Syracuse Orange, McNeese Cowboys and NC State Wolfpack.

== Early life ==
Copeland was born on September 4, 2003, in Philadelphia, Pennsylvania. He moved from Philadelphia to Gettysburg in middle school, later attending Gettysburg High School where he made the varsity team in basketball as a freshman. He was selected second-team All-YAIAA Division II as a sophomore. Copeland had a growth spurt after his sophomore year, reaching a height of 6 feet 6 inches (1.98 m) after gaining five inches. As a junior, he helped Gettysburg to the YAIAA Division II championship and a record of 23–5 while averaging 22.1 points, 11 rebounds and 4.2 assists per game. Copeland was selected first-team all-state, the lone player from the YAIAA to receive the honor.

After his junior year, Copeland transferred to Life Center Academy in Burlington, New Jersey, while reclassifying from the class of 2021 to the class of 2022. He averaged 17 points in his lone season there before transferring to IMG Academy in Bradenton, Florida. He played his final high school season at IMG and was also a member of the AAU Team Melo. A four-star recruit, and ranked one of the top-100 prospects nationally, Copeland committed to play college basketball for the Syracuse Orange.

== College career ==
As a freshman for the Orange during the 2022–23 season, Copeland averaged 2.1 points. He was the team's sixth man in 2023–24, appearing in 32 games while averaging 8.6 points, 4.6 rebounds and 2.8 assists. After his second season at Syracuse, Copeland entered the NCAA transfer portal and transferred to the McNeese Cowboys. Starting 24 of 32 games for the Cowboys in 2024–25, he averaged 9.5 points, 4.8 assists and 3.3 rebounds, placing first on the team in assists while being named second-team All-Southland Conference and to the Southland Conference All-Tournament team. After McNeese coach Will Wade left for the NC State Wolfpack, Copeland transferred there. In one season at NC State, he was named third-team All-Atlantic Coast Conference (ACC) after averaging 13.9 points and a conference-leading 6.5 assists per game.

== Professional career ==
After going unselected in the 2026 NBA draft, Copeland signed a two-way contract with the Houston Rockets.

== Career statistics ==
Legend
| GP | Games played | GS | Games started | MPG | Minutes per game |
| FG% | Field goal percentage | 3P% | 3-point field goal percentage | FT% | Free throw percentage |
| RPG | Rebounds per game | APG | Assists per game | SPG | Steals per game |
| BPG | Blocks per game | PPG | Points per game | **Bold** | Career high |

=== College ===
| Year | Team | GP | GS | MPG | FG% | 3P% | FT% | RPG | APG | SPG | BPG | PPG |
|---|---|---|---|---|---|---|---|---|---|---|---|---|
| 2022–23 | Syracuse | 20 | 0 | 9.3 | .341 | .111 | **.867** | 1.6 | .5 | .5 | .1 | 2.1 |
| 2023–24 | Syracuse | 32 | 1 | 22.4 | .478 | .250 | .683 | **4.6** | 2.8 | 1.5 | .2 | 9.6 |
| 2024–25 | McNeese | **35** | 24 | 21.9 | .488 | .154 | .681 | 3.3 | 4.5 | 1.4 | **.3** | 9.2 |
| 2025–26 | NC State | 34 | **34** | **28.9** | **.494** | **.397** | .775 | 3.6 | **6.5** | **1.8** | .1 | **13.9** |
| Career | | 121 | 59 | 21.9 | .480 | .285 | .727 | 3.5 | 3.9 | 1.4 | .2 | 9.5 |
