= Mount Joy Township, Pennsylvania =

Mount Joy Township is the name of some places in the U.S. state of Pennsylvania:

- Mount Joy Township, Adams County, Pennsylvania
- Mount Joy Township, Lancaster County, Pennsylvania
