= Francis Worley =

American politician

Member of the Pennsylvania House of Representatives from the 91st district
- In office 1969–1970
- Preceded by: District created
- Succeeded by: Fred G. Klunk

Member of the Pennsylvania House of Representatives from the Adams County district
- In office 1943–1968

Personal details
- Born: December 23, 1913 Latimore Township, Adams County, Pennsylvania
- Died: May 8, 2003 (aged 89) York Springs, Pennsylvania
- Party: Republican

Francis Worley (December 23, 1913 – May 8, 2003) was a Republican member of the Pennsylvania House of Representatives.
