= Pleasant Grove School (Mt. Joy Township, Pennsylvania) =

- U.S. National Register of Historic Places
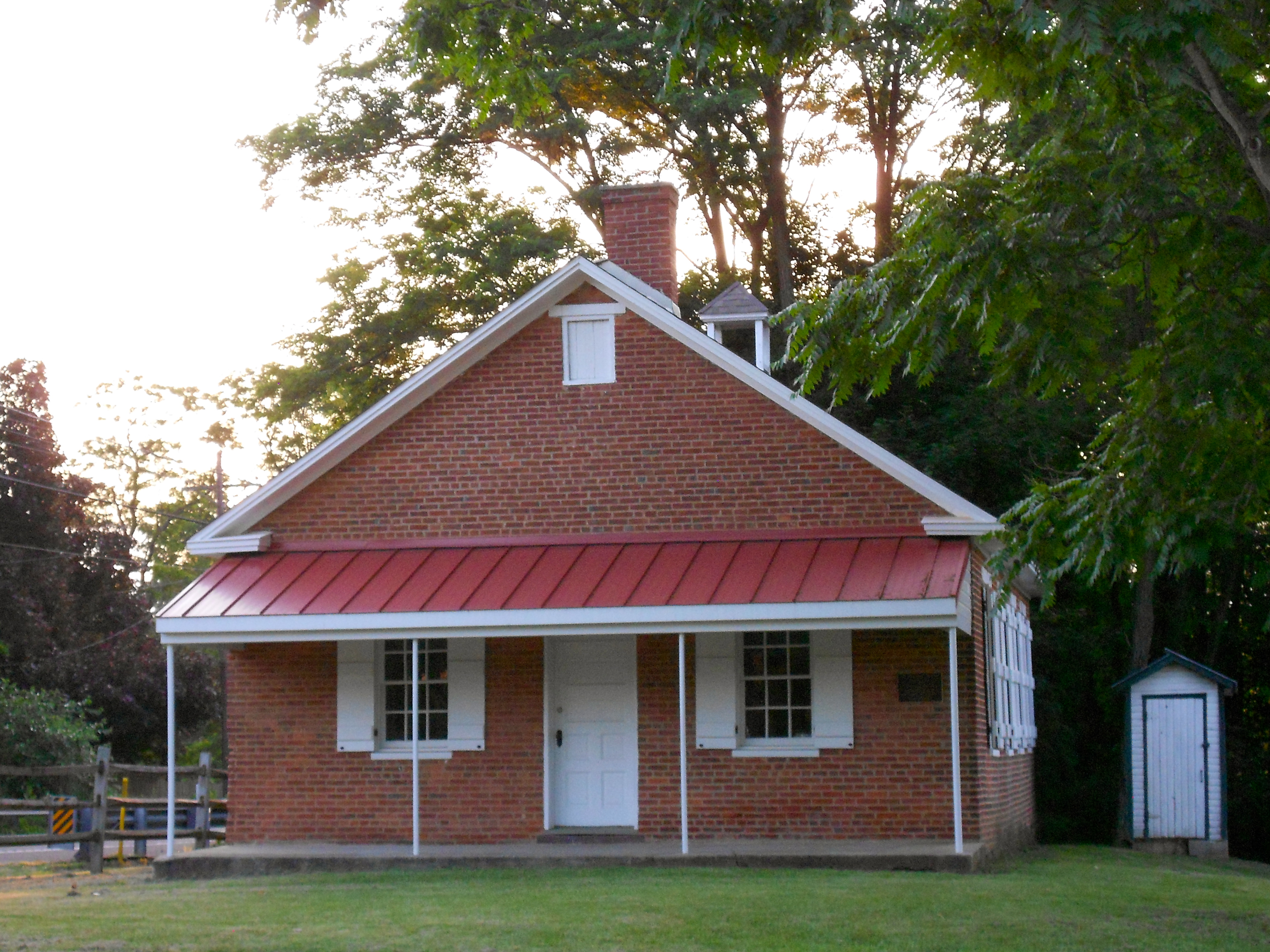
- Pleasant Grove School, June 2013

- Location within Pennsylvania
- Location: 4084 Baltimore Pike, Mount Joy Township, Adams County, Pennsylvania
- Coordinates: 39°45′51″N 77°08′16″W
- Area: less than one acre
- MPS: Educational Resources of Pennsylvania MPS
- NRHP reference No.: 12000603
- Added to NRHP: September 4, 2012

The Pleasant Grove School, also known as Mud College, is a historic one-room school building located at Mount Joy Township, Adams County, Pennsylvania, United States. It was built in 1869, and is a one-story gable-front brick building. Also on the property is one contributing outhouse, built in 1951. The school closed in 1949, and is owned by the township and operated as a living history museum.

It was listed on the National Register of Historic Places in 2012.
