= Wirts House =

Historic house in Pennsylvania, United States

- U.S. National Register of Historic Places
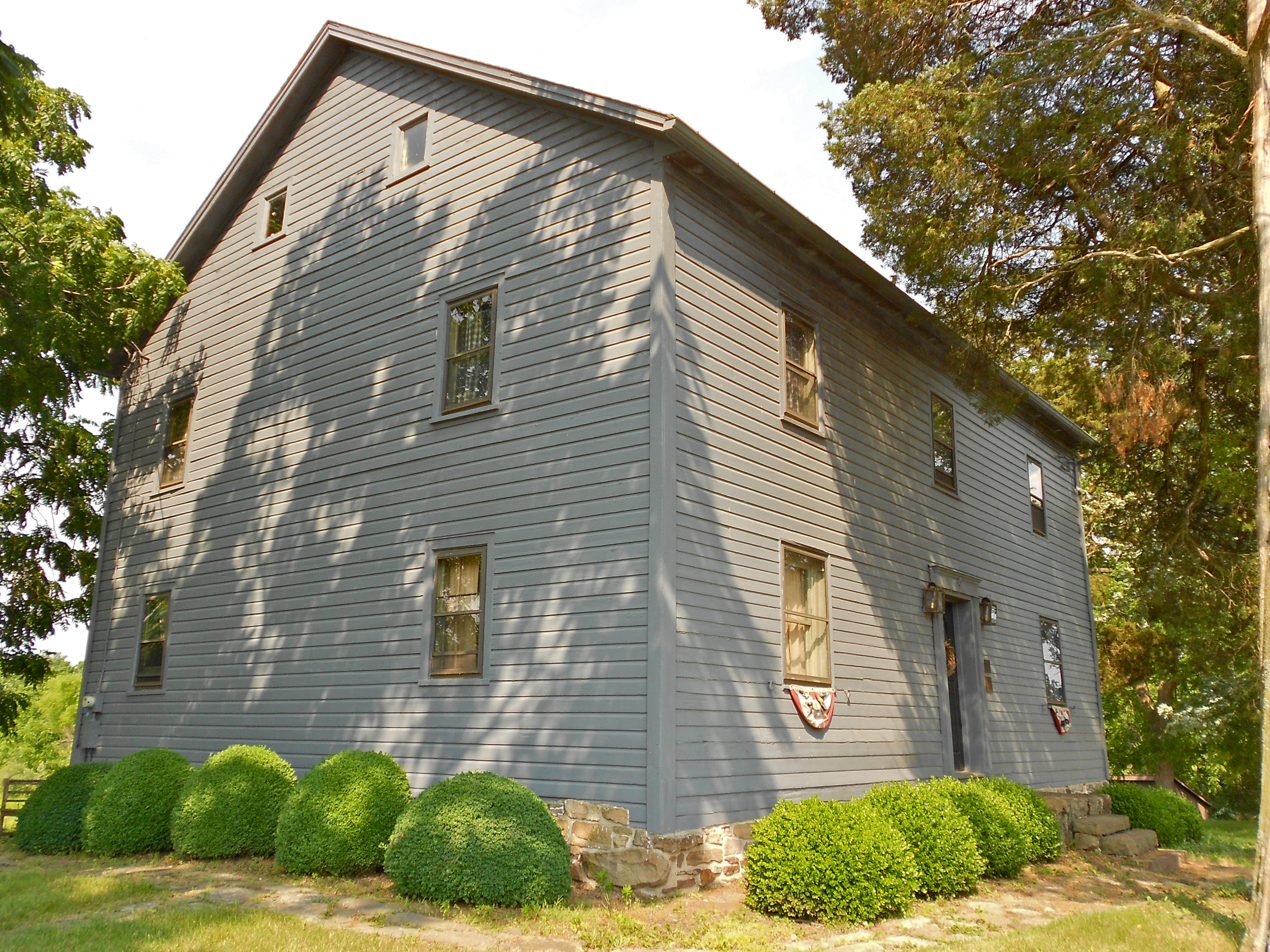

- Location within Pennsylvania Location within the United States
- Location: 798 Schrivers Corner Road (Pennsylvania Route 394), near Gettysburg, Straban Township, Pennsylvania
- Coordinates: 39°53′45″N 77°11′58″W
- Area: 4 acres (1.6 ha)
- Built: c. 1765
- Architectural style: Federal
- NRHP reference No.: 91002010
- Added to NRHP: January 22, 1992

Wirts House is an historic home that is located in Straban Township, Adams County, Pennsylvania, United States.

It was listed on the National Register of Historic Places in 1992.

== History and architectural features ==
A two-story, rectangular, log/wood-frame, vernacular, Federal-style dwelling, it is covered in wooden clapboard siding and sits on a rubble stone foundation. The original section dates to circa 1765, with a "back building" addition that was built roughly between 1786 and 1812.It also has a two-story addition that was built roughly between 1825 and 1830.

It was listed on the National Register of Historic Places in 1992.
