= Clark S. Smith =

American politician

Member of the Pennsylvania House of Representatives from the 91st district
- In office 1973–1974
- Preceded by: Fred Klunk
- Succeeded by: Kenneth J. Cole

Personal details
- Born: May 30, 1912 Pennsylvania, U.S.
- Died: October 28, 2014 (aged 102) Gettysburg, Pennsylvania, U.S.
- Party: Republican
- Spouse: Janet Ott Rhoads (1967–2005)

Clark S. Smith (May 30, 1912 – October 28, 2014) was an American Republican politician who was a member of the Pennsylvania House of Representatives. He turned 100 in May 2012 and died in October 2014.
