= McKnightstown, Pennsylvania =

Unincorporated community in Pennsylvania, US

- Census-designated place
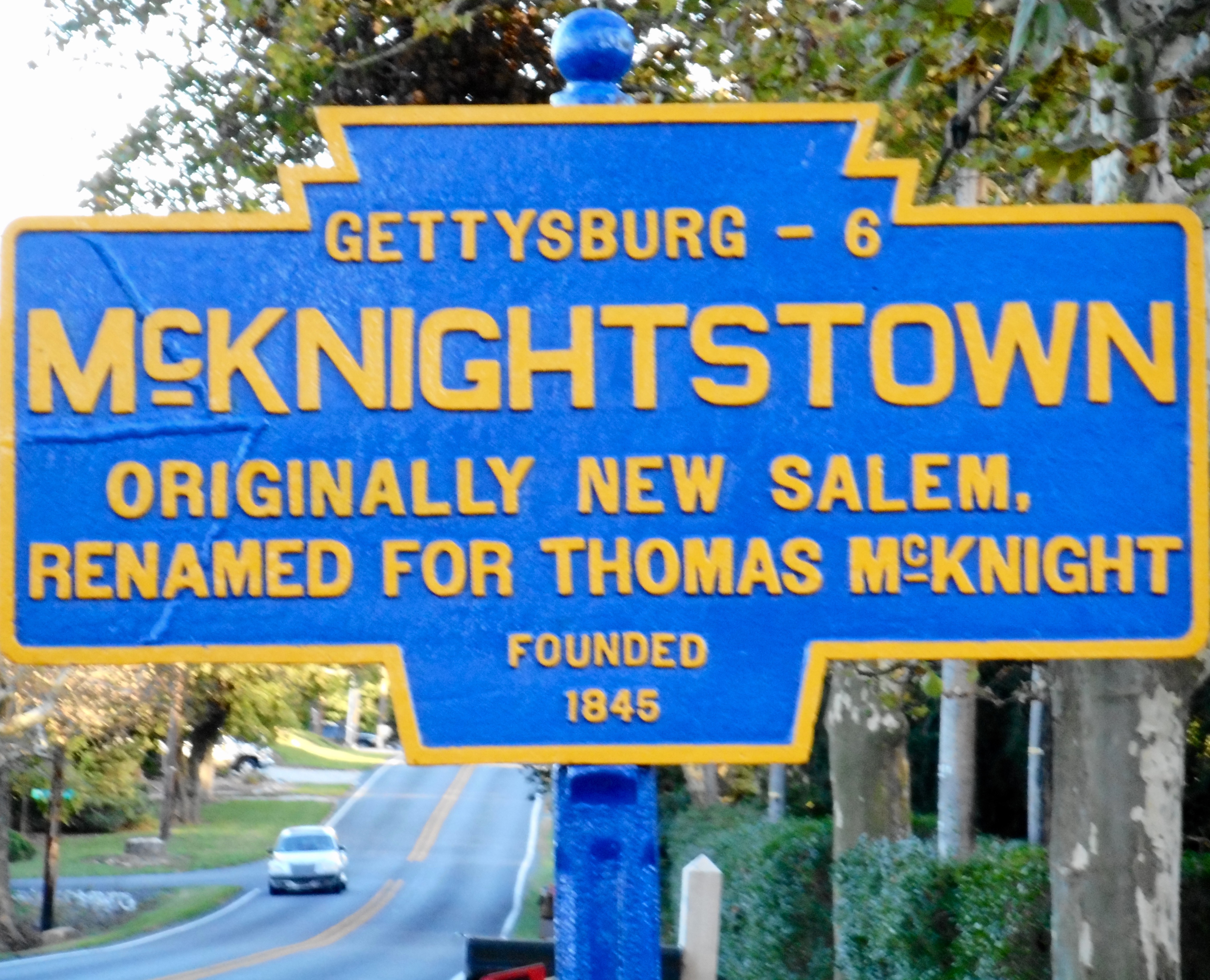
- Keystone Marker

- Location in Adams County and the state of Pennsylvania.
- Coordinates: 39°52′07″N 77°19′39″W
- Country: United States
- State: Pennsylvania
- County: Adams
- Township: Franklin

Area
  - Total: 1.44 sq mi (3.74 km^{2})
  - Land: 1.44 sq mi (3.74 km^{2})
  - Water: 0 sq mi (0.00 km^{2})
- Elevation: 640 ft (200 m)

Population (2020)
  - Total: 387
  - Density: 267.6/sq mi (103.34/km^{2})
- Time zone: UTC-5 (Eastern (EST))
  - Summer (DST): UTC-4 (EDT)
- ZIP Code: 17343 (established 1860)
- FIPS code: 42-46312
- GNIS feature ID: 2630025

McKnightstown is a census-designated place (CDP) in Franklin Township, Adams County, Pennsylvania, United States. It was formerly part of the Cashtown-McKnightstown CDP as of the 2000 census, and was then split into two separate CDPs for the 2010 census.

== History ==
The founder of the Eshelman manufacturing company was born in the town, and the 1919 Motor Transport Corps convoy travelled through the town on the Lincoln Highway before a modern highway bypassed the town in 1948–9.

== Demographics ==
Historical population
Census	Pop.	Note	%±
2010	226		—
2020	387		71.2%
U.S. Decennial Census

As of the 2020 census the population was 387.

== Education ==
It is in the Gettysburg Area School District.

Franklin Township Elementary School has an Orrtanna post office address, but is physically in the Cashtown CDP. This is the zoned school for McKnightstown. The district's comprehensive middle and high schools are Gettysburg Area Middle School and Gettysburg Area High School.

== Gallery ==
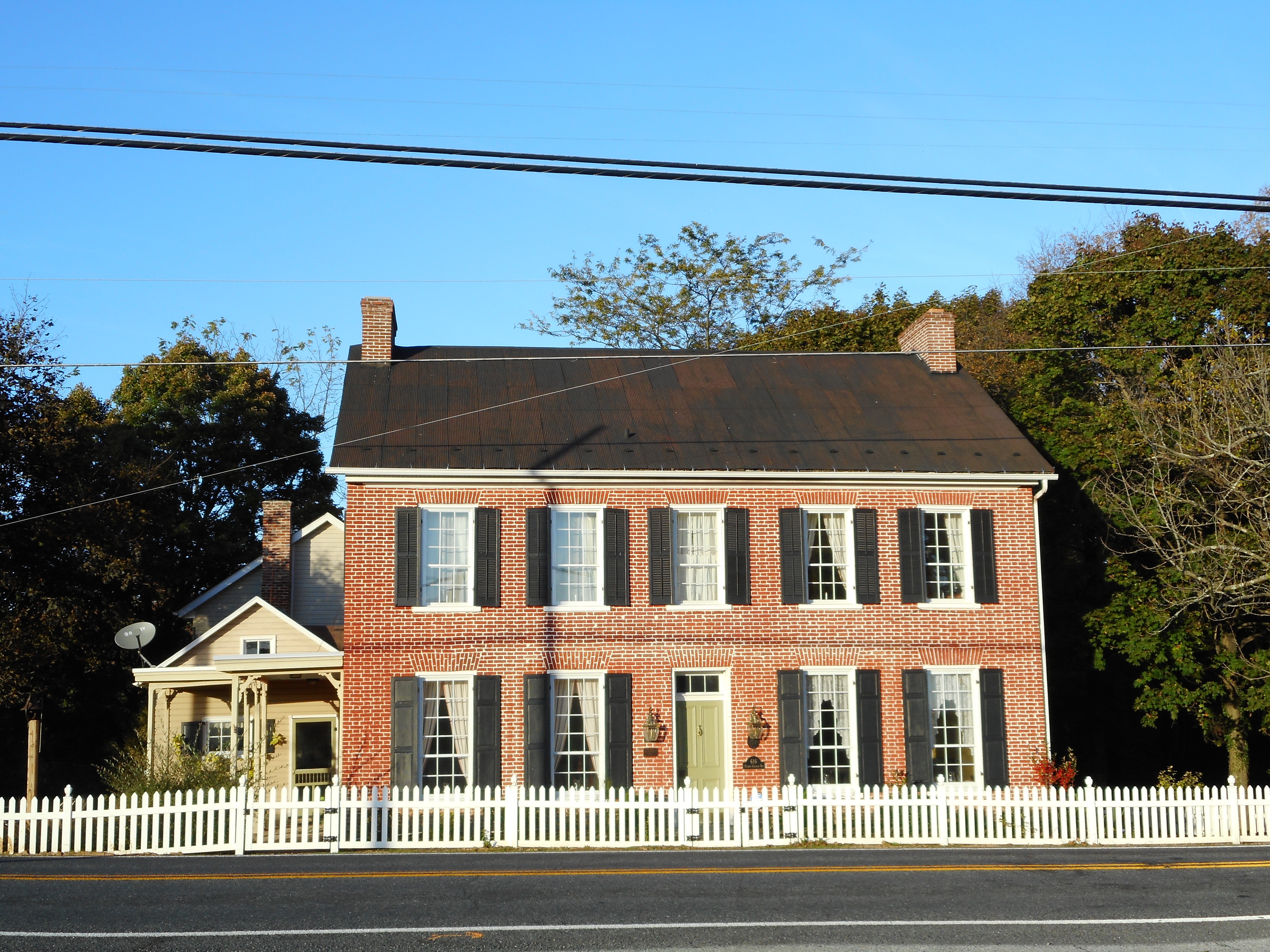
Lincoln Highway at Flohr's Church Road
