= Kenneth J. Cole =

American politician

Member of the Pennsylvania House of Representatives from the 91st district
- In office December 1, 1974 – December 1, 1992
- Preceded by: Clark S. Smith
- Succeeded by: Stephen Maitland

Personal details
- Born: February 13, 1936 (age 90) Gettysburg, Pennsylvania
- Party: Democratic

Kenneth Joseph Cole (born February 13, 1936) is a former Democratic member of the Pennsylvania House of Representatives.
