= Battle of Hunterstown =

Battle of the American Civil War

Coordinates: 39°52′57.18″N 77°09′42.42″W

- Part of the American Civil War
Date	July 2, 1863
Location	Beaverdam Creek near Hunterstown, Pennsylvania
Result	Draw

Belligerents
(United States) USA (Union)	(Confederate States of America) CSA (Confederacy)

Commanders and leaders
George Armstrong Custer	Wade Hampton

The Battle of Hunterstown was an American Civil War skirmish at Beaverdam Creek near Hunterstown, Pennsylvania, on July 2, 1863, in which Wade Hampton's Confederate cavalry withdrew after engaging George Armstrong Custer's and Elon Farnsworth's Union cavalry.

== Background ==
At dawn on July 2, 1863, the Union Army of the Potomac deployed near Gettysburg had cavalry posted elsewhere to protect the flanks and to look for Confederate activity, particularly Maj. Gen. J.E.B. Stuart's cavalry. Stuart arrived at Gen. Robert E. Lee's headquarters between noon and 1 p.m., and about an hour later Brig. Gen. Wade Hampton's exhausted brigade arrived. Stuart ordered Hampton to take a position to cover the left rear of the Confederate battle lines. Hampton moved into position astride the Hunterstown Road four miles northeast of Gettysburg, blocking access for any Union forces that might try to swing around behind Lee's lines. Two brigades of Union cavalry from Brig. Gen. Judson Kilpatrick's division under Brig. Gens. George Armstrong Custer and Elon J. Farnsworth were probing for the end of the Confederate left flank later the afternoon of July 2.

== Engagement ==
Custer's men collided with Hampton on the road between Hunterstown and Gettysburg. As he led a charge of Company A, 6th Michigan Cavalry, against the Confederate rear guard, Custer fell under his wounded horse and was saved by his orderly, Norvell F. Churchill. Hampton wanted to escalate the action, positioning most of his brigade along a ridge in readiness to charge Custer's position. At that stage, Elon Farnsworth arrived with his brigade. Hampton did not press his attack, and an artillery duel ensued until dark when Hampton withdrew towards Gettysburg.

== Aftermath ==
The battlefield (colloq. "North Cavalry Field", which is northeast of the Gettysburg Battlefield) is privately owned and includes a power plant. The village of Hunterstown has a small plaque commemorating the nearby engagement, and on July 2, 2008, a marble monument honoring Custer was unveiled and dedicated.
