= Dan Moul =

American politician

Member of the Pennsylvania House of Representatives from the 91st district
- Incumbent
- Assumed office January 2, 2007
- Preceded by: Stephen R. Maitland

Personal details
- Born: October 10, 1959 (age 67) Hanover, Pennsylvania, U.S.
- Party: Republican
- Spouse: Lori
- Children: 2
- Education: York College of Pennsylvania
- Alma mater: New Oxford High School
- Website: www.repmoul.com

Daniel P. Moul (born October 10, 1950) is an American politician and businessman currently serving as a Republican member of the Pennsylvania House of Representatives from the 91st District since 2007.

== Early life and education ==
Moul was born on October 10, 1950, in Hanover, Pennsylvania. He graduated from New Oxford High School in 1977 and studied finance at York College of Pennsylvania.

== Career ==
Prior to his run for political office, Moul worked in sales at Utz Brands. After that Moul operated his own real estate development business.

=== Pennsylvania House of Representatives ===
Moul was first elected to the Pennsylvania House of Representatives in 2006. He was re-elected to eight more consecutive terms.

In 2020, Moul was among twenty-six Pennsylvania House Republicans who called for the reversal of Joe Biden's certification as the winner of Pennsylvania's electoral votes in the 2020 United States presidential election, citing false claims of election irregularities.

==== Committee Assignments, 2023-2024 ====
- Agriculture and Rural Affairs (Minority Chair)

==== Committee Assignments, 2021-2022 ====
- Tourism and Recreational Development
- Local Government (Majority Chair)

== Personal life ==
Moul lives in Conewago Township, Adams County, Pennsylvania, with his wife Lori. They have two children and five grandchildren.
