= Fred Klunk =

American politician

Fred G. Klunk

Member of the Pennsylvania House of Representatives from the 91st district
- In office 1971–1972
- Preceded by: Francis Worley
- Succeeded by: Clark S. Smith

Personal details
- Born: July 30, 1910 Mount Pleasant Township, Pennsylvania, United States
- Died: March 23, 1975 (aged 64) York, Pennsylvania
- Party: Democratic

Fred G. Klunk (July 30, 1910 – March 23, 1975) is a former Democratic member of the Pennsylvania House of Representatives.
