= Spangler–Benner Farm =

Historic house in Pennsylvania, United States

- U.S. National Register of Historic Places
- U.S. Historic district
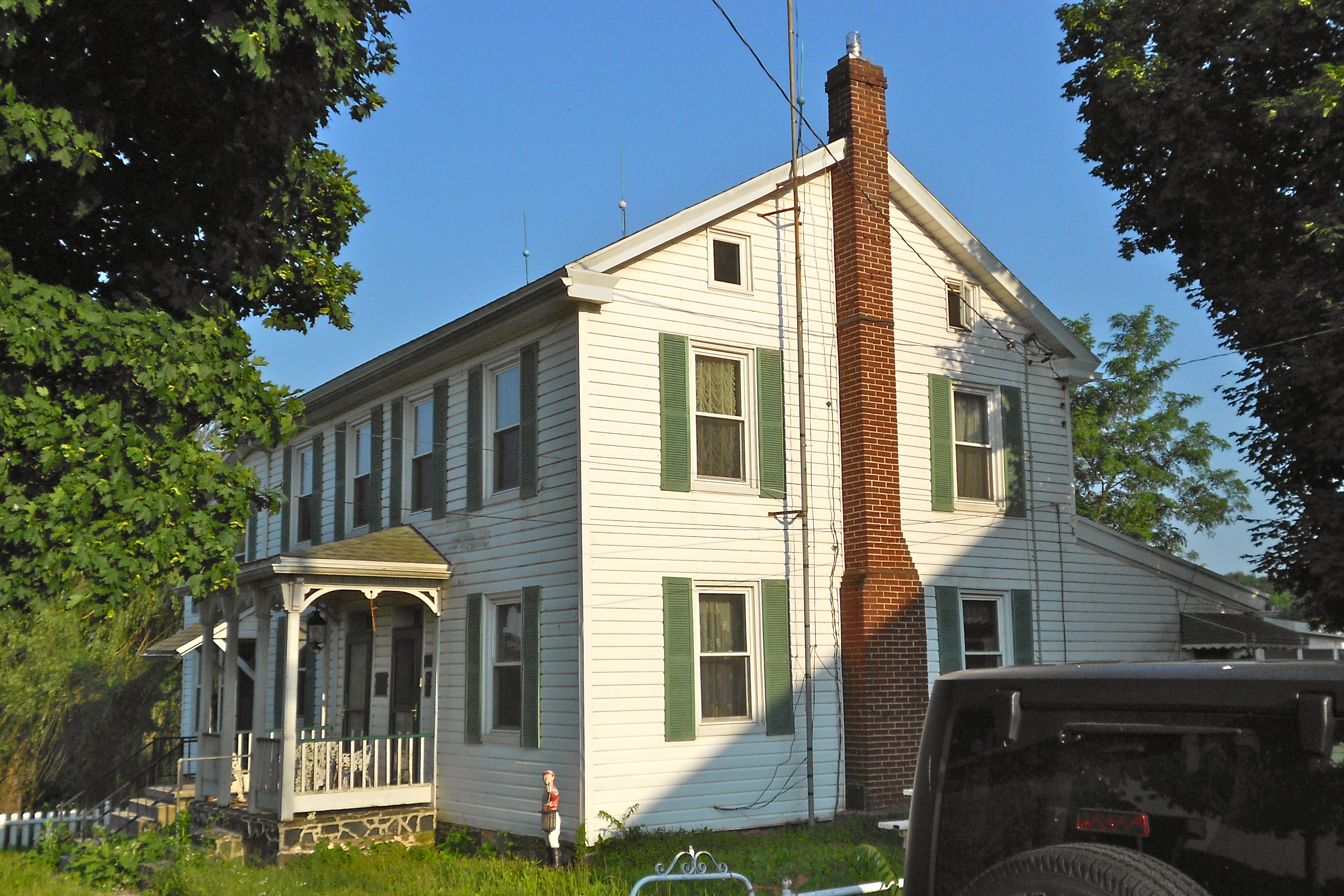
- Farmhouse

- Location within Pennsylvania Location within the United States
- Location: 230 Benner Road, near Gettysburg, Mount Joy Township, Pennsylvania
- Coordinates: 39°44′39″N 77°13′34″W
- Area: 145.5 acres (58.9 ha)
- Built: 1864
- Architectural style: 19th century farm house
- NRHP reference No.: 92001493
- Added to NRHP: October 29, 1992

The Spangler–Benner Farm is an historic farm and national historic district that is located in Mount Joy Township in Adams County, Pennsylvania, United States.

== History and architectural features ==
This district includes nine contributing buildings and two contributing structures. The contributing buildings are the sided log farmhouse (1870), a frame bank barn (1864), a log summer kitchen (1802), a smoke house, a spring house, wagon sheds, tools sheds, and machine shops. The contributing structures consist of a wooden silo and a metal windmill, both erected in 1900. The farm has remained in continuous ownership by the same family since 1802.

It was listed on the National Register of Historic Places in 1992.

== Gallery ==
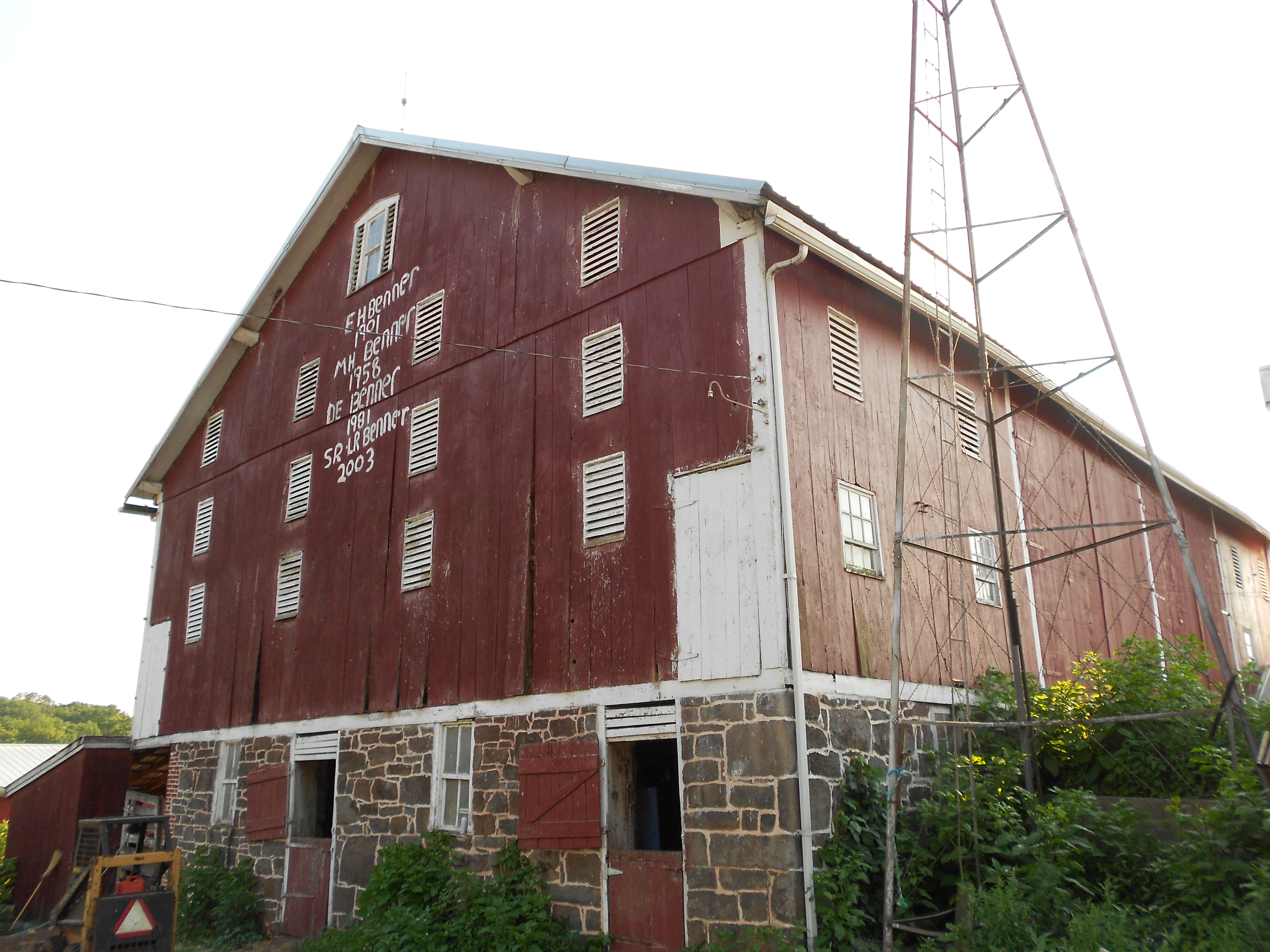
Barn
