= Cashtown, Franklin County, Pennsylvania =

Unincorporated community in Pennsylvania, U.S.

Coordinates: 39°52′04″N 77°44′11″W

Cashtown is an unincorporated community in Franklin County, in the U.S. state of Pennsylvania.

== History ==
Cashtown had approximately 50 inhabitants in 1878.
