= Cashtown Inn =

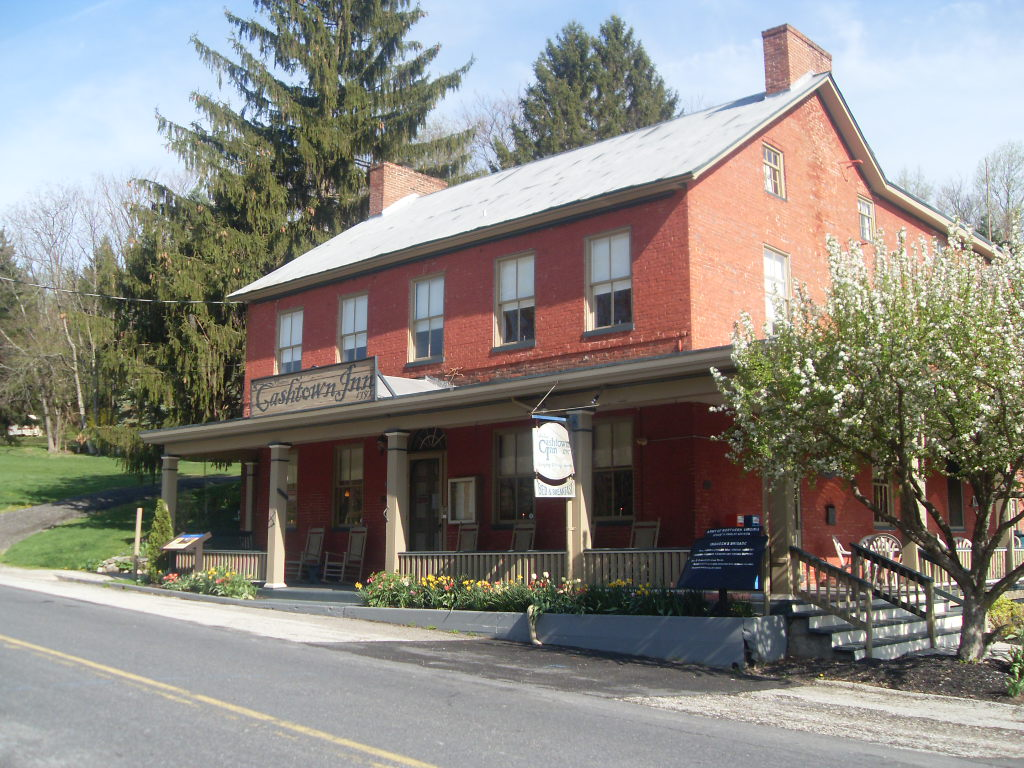
- Cashtown Inn

- Location within Pennsylvania

General information
- Type: Bed and breakfast
- Location: Cashtown, Pennsylvania
- Coordinates: 39°53.078′N 77°21.625′W
- Owner: Jeremy and Danielle Davis

Website
- http://www.cashtowninn.com/

Cashtown Inn is a bed and breakfast in Cashtown, Pennsylvania, about eight miles from Gettysburg.

== History ==
The Cashtown Inn was built in 1797. The crossroads it sat near would eventually bear the same name, Cashtown. In 1815, owner Peter Marck acquired a tavern license and originally had four rooms available.

During the Gettysburg campaign, the inn became the headquarters for many Confederate officers and staff, including Generals A. P. Hill, John D. Imboden, and Henry Heth. The basement also served as a field hospital during the battle, and it is said that so many amputations were performed, that the limbs piled up outside blocked any sunlight from coming in the cellar window.

The Cashtown Inn now has four rooms and three suites, each named after a Confederate general. In recent years, the inn has gotten a lot of media attention, especially due to paranormal activity. It was the subject of the season four Ghost Hunters episode "The Fear Cage." The inn is also seen in the movie Gettysburg and actor Sam Elliott stayed here during filming.

== Paranormal activity ==
The Cashtown Inn is often a topic that guests talk about with their Gettysburg ghost tour guides. Multiple guests mentioned that there was a swing at the front porch that would swing back and forth with neither someone sitting on it, nor wind to move it. Others shared that footsteps could be heard running through the hallways, lights were flickering, strange noises were frequently heard, and other disruptive sounds were discovered. The strange noises were mostly men’s cries.

D.E. Pope, a Gettysburg ghost tour guide, has a family friend who frequently visits The Cashtown Inn. “He had a heart condition and was therefore on some potent medication. Along with being strong, the medicine was quite pricey, so because of its life-saving effectiveness, and the expenses associated with it, he was always cognizant of where this particular medication was. Every evening, as a nightly routine, he would always pull out his medication for the next day and place it on his nightstand so he would know where it was the following morning. Following protocol, during one of his stays at the inn, he did just that. The next morning when he went to take his pills, he quickly realized the medication he had sat out the night before was not on the nightstand. He asked his wife where she moved his pills to, and she was dumbfounded. Despite getting down on their hands and knees, and looking all over the floor, including underneath the bed and nightstand, his pills were nowhere to be found. Up to this day if you ask him what happened to his medication that night, he will tell you that someone or something took it, and it was not one of them.” It was unknown whether this experience was paranormal or had a logical explanation.

An example of what was said to be a definite paranormal experience was a story about Debbie and Mark L.’s stay at The Cashtown Inn. “At some point in the middle of the night, they both were awakened by a noise that to them sounded like someone jiggling their doorknob, as if they were trying to get into their guestroom. Mark quickly checked the door and found nothing. Certain that they had heard something, they had trouble falling back to sleep. Eventually they did, but then Debbie was awoken to the same noise she had heard previously. Checking her watch on the nightstand, she noticed it was quarter after four in the morning. Still hearing the noise after several minutes, she nudged Mark awake, and they both listened once again. The noise eventually stopped, but sleep at that point was impossible, so the couple watched some early morning television before embarking on the activities of the day.” The cause of the noise is unknown; maybe it is the ghosts of Confederate soldiers who died during the American Civil War. Thus, the most popular suite for ghost enthusiasts to book at the Cashtown Inn once belonged to General Robert E. Lee: Room 5.
