= Straban Township, Pennsylvania =

Township in Pennsylvania, US

Coordinates: 39°52′00″N 77°07′59″W

Straban Township, Adams County, Pennsylvania
- Township
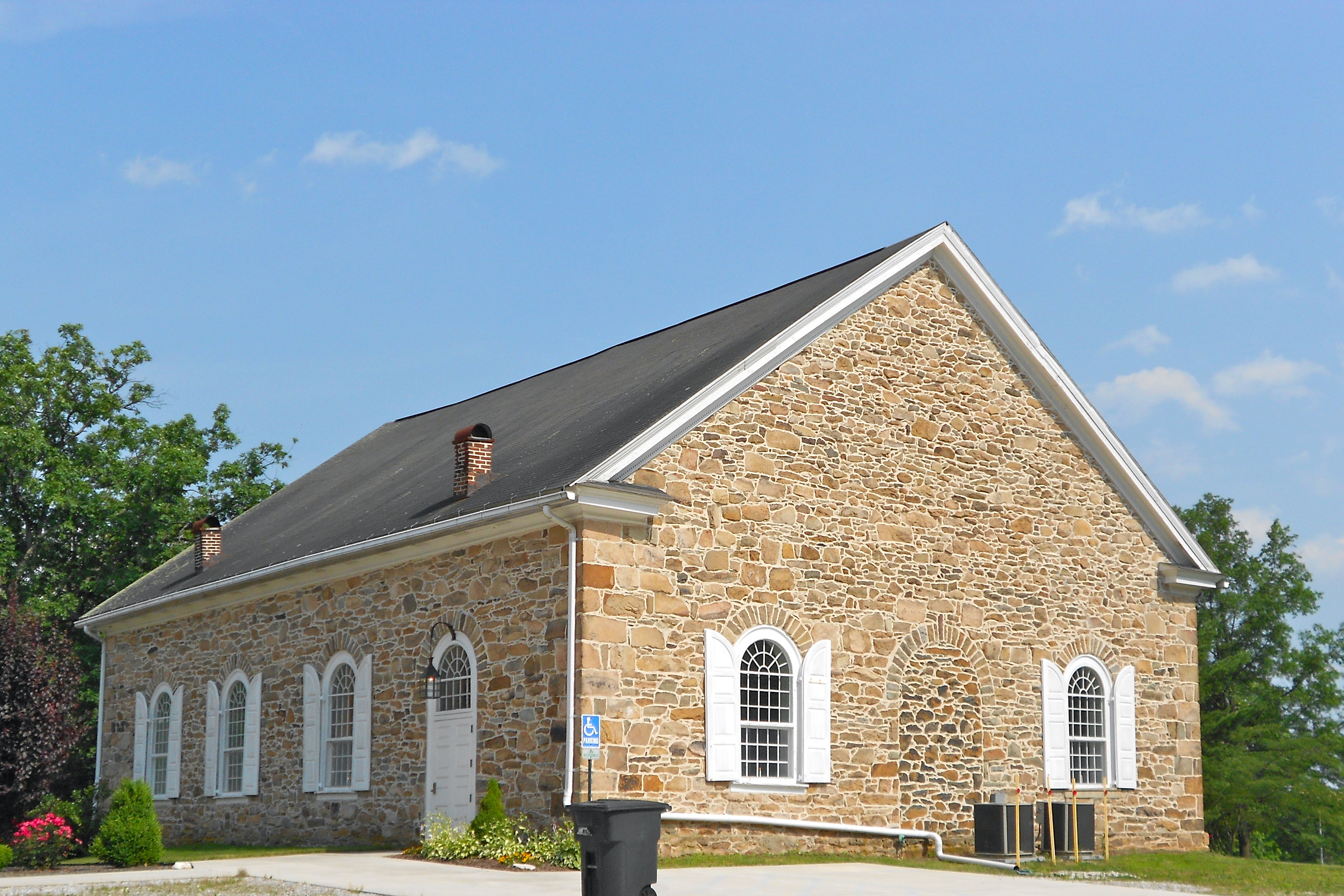
- Great Conewago Presbyterian Church

- Location in Adams County and the state of Pennsylvania.
- Country: United States
- State: Pennsylvania
- County: Adams
- Settled: 1741
- Incorporated: 1746

Area
  - Total: 34.46 sq mi (89.24 km^{2})
  - Land: 34.30 sq mi (88.83 km^{2})
  - Water: 0.16 sq mi (0.41 km^{2})

Population (2010)
  - Total: 4,928
  - Estimate (2016): 4,943
  - Density: 144.1/sq mi (55.65/km^{2})
- Time zone: UTC-5 (Eastern (EST))
  - Summer (DST): UTC-4 (EDT)
- Area code: 717
- FIPS code: 42-001-74680
- Website: www.strabantownship.com

Straban Township is a township in Adams County, Pennsylvania, United States. The population was 4,928 at the 2010 census.

== Geography ==
Straban Township is located in central Adams County, adjacent to the eastern border of Gettysburg. A portion of the Gettysburg National Military Park is within the township. According to the United States Census Bureau, the township has a total area of 34.4 square miles (89.2 km^{2}), of which 34.3 square miles (88.8 km^{2}) is land and 0.15 square miles (0.4 km^{2}), or 0.46%, is water. It contains the census-designated place of Hunterstown and part of Lake Heritage.

== History ==
=== Founding ===
Straban Township was created in 1746 when the area was still part of Lancaster County. Named for Strabane, a town in Northern Ireland, this spelling was in use as late as the 1870s. For the most part, the original boundaries remain unchanged to this day. York County was formed out of Lancaster County in 1749, and for the next 51 years, Straban Township was a part of York County, until Adams County was formed in 1800.

The Hunterstown Historic District, Great Conewago Presbyterian Church and Wirts House are listed on the National Register of Historic Places.

=== Casino proposal ===
During 2006 there was debate about the proposed construction of a casino in Straban Township near the intersection of U.S. Route 15 and U.S. Route 30, not far from the East Cavalry Field battle site. Legislation enacted in 2005 known as "Act 71" permitted up to 60,000 slot machines to be located in casinos throughout the state in an effort to offset high property taxes. One of two available casino licenses was pursued by Chance Enterprises Inc. and Millennium Management Group for their proposed "Crossroads Gaming Resort & Spa". Many of the residents of neighboring Gettysburg and tourists believed that a casino near Gettysburg and the resulting increase in traffic would have had a negative impact on Gettysburg's hallowed ground. A group called "No Casino Gettysburg", made up of local citizens as well as students and faculty of Gettysburg College, was formed to lobby against the proposal. On April 3, 2006, the Gettysburg borough council voted by 6–3 to support the proposal.

The Pennsylvania Gaming Control Board (PGCB) began hearings on the proposal on April 5, 2006, at Gettysburg College. A second hearing was held on April 7, 2006, in Harrisburg, and a third and final hearing occurred on May 17, 2006, at Gettysburg College. On December 20, 2006, the PGCB opted not to award Crossroads a casino license, effectively killing the proposal. Crossroads' president soon announced that he would not appeal the decision. In February 2007, the activist group, No Casino Gettysburg, disbanded.

== Demographics ==
Historical population
Census	Pop.	Note	%±
2000	4,539		—
2010	4,928		8.6%
2016 (est.)	4,943		0.3%
U.S. Decennial Census

As of the census of 2000, there were 4,539 people, 1,687 households, and 1,233 families residing in the township. The population density was 131.9 inhabitants per square mile (50.9/km^{2}). There were 1,816 housing units at an average density of 52.8 per square mile (20.4/km^{2}). The racial makeup of the township was 95.86% White, 1.43% African American, 0.18% Native American, 0.73% Asian, 0.90% from other races, and 0.90% from two or more races. Hispanic or Latino of any race were 2.29% of the population.

There were 1,687 households, out of which 30.8% had children under the age of 18 living with them, 61.3% were married couples living together, 7.8% had a female householder with no husband present, and 26.9% were non-families. 21.9% of all households were made up of individuals, and 11.0% had someone living alone who was 65 years of age or older. The average household size was 2.55 and the average family size was 2.97.

In the township, the population was spread out, with 22.2% under the age of 18, 6.8% from 18 to 24, 25.4% from 25 to 44, 25.7% from 45 to 64, and 19.9% who were 65 years of age or older. The median age was 42 years. For every 100 females, there were 92.7 males. For every 100 females age 18 and over, there were 89.4 males.

The median income for a household in the township was $44,008, and the median income for a family was $51,979. Males had a median income of $30,231 versus $22,336 for females. The per capita income for the township was $19,530. About 4.5% of families and 5.4% of the population were below the poverty line, including 3.6% of those under age 18 and 3.5% of those age 65 or over.

== Education ==
The majority of Straban Township is in the Gettysburg Area School District, while a portion is in the Conewago Valley School District.

Gettysburg Area High School, of the Gettysburg District, is in the township. The Conewago District's comprehensive high school is New Oxford High School.
