= Gettysburg Area School District =

School district in Pennsylvania

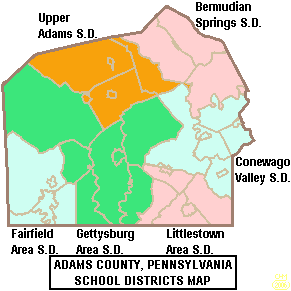
- Map of Adams County school districts

Location
- Gettysburg, Pennsylvania South Central Pennsylvania United States
- Coordinates: 39.850500°N 77.233520°W

District information
- Type: Public
- Motto: A Great Place to Learn
- Grades: K-12
- Established: 1971

Students and staff
- District mascot: Gettysburg Warriors

Other information
- Website: www.gettysburg.k12.pa.us

The Gettysburg Area School District is a mid-sized, rural, public school district which serves students in a area of Adams County, Pennsylvania. The district includes: Gettysburg Borough, as well as Cumberland, Freedom, Highland, Franklin and parts of Mt. Joy and Straban Townships. Staff over the years have changed most recently 2 staff from lincoln elementary are retirering, Mike Ginter and Leslie woodward another one from lincoln has retired recently sharon

martin

The district also includes the census-designated places of Cashtown, Hunterstown, and McKnightstown, as well as most of the Lake Heritage CDP and a portion of the Orrtanna CDP.

According to 2000 federal census data, Gettysburg Area School District served a resident population of 26,205 people. By 2010, the district's population increased to 27,614 people. The educational attainment levels for the Gettysburg Area School District population (25 years old and over) were 87.4% high school graduates and 27.4% college graduates. The district is one of the 500 public school districts of Pennsylvania.

According to the Pennsylvania Budget and Policy Center, 42.3% of the district's pupils lived at 185% or below the Federal Poverty Level as shown by their eligibility for the federal free or reduced price school meal programs in 2012. In 2013, the Pennsylvania Department of Education, reported that 130 students in Gettysburg Area School District were homeless. In 2009, the district residents' per capita income was $18,982, while median family income was $50,396 a year. In the Commonwealth, the median family income was $49,501 and the United States median family income was $49,445, in 2010. In Adams County, the median household income was $59,492. By 2013, the median household income in the United States rose to $52,100. In 2014, the median household income in the USA was $53,700.

The district operates three elementary schools Franklin Township Elementary School - K-5, James Gettys Elementary School - K-5, Lincoln Elementary School - K-5, one middle school (grades 6–8) and Gettysburg Area High School (grades 9–12.) Since 2010, the district has also offered a Virtual Academy program to pupils in grades 7th through 12th. There is no cost to the parent for the program; with: computer, software, books are all provided by the district. The pupils have access to all extracurricular programs in the district and can earn a Gettysburg Area School District diploma.

Lincoln Intermediate Unit #12 provides a wide variety of services to children living in its region which includes Gettysburg Area School District. Early screening, special educations services, speech and hearing therapy, Head Start preschool classes and many other services are available. Services for children during the preschool years are provided without cost to their families when the child is determined to meet eligibility requirements.

== Schools ==
Name	Level	Information
Gettysburg Area High School	9-12	A new facility was built and moved into in January 1998. Sports Mascot: Warriors.
Gettysburg Area Middle School	6-8	Formerly Gettysburg Area Junior High School. Sports Mascot: Warriors. New building built and moved into in 2014.
Lincoln Elementary School	K-5	Former site of Gettysburg Area High School. Named for former president Abraham Lincoln, who visited Gettysburg in November 1863 when he delivered his famous Gettysburg Address.
Franklin Township Elementary School	K-5	Located west of Gettysburg in Cashtown.
James Gettys Elementary School	K-5	Named for James Gettys, the founder of the borough of Gettysburg.

In June 2011, the school board voted to close Eisenhower Elementary School. The school had opened in the 1959–60 school year. Closing the school was projected to save $500,000. The building was leased to two public charter schools: Vida Charter School and Gettysburg Montessori Charter School beginning with the 2011–12 school year. Gettysburg Montessori has moved out of this building recently. The lease provides the district with over $150,000 in rent.

== Extracurriculars ==
The Gettysburg Area School District offers a variety of clubs, activities and an extensive sports program. The district funds:

=== Sports ===
Varsity

Boys

- Baseball - AAA
- Basketball- AAA
- Cross Country - AA
- Football - AAA
- Golf - AAA
- Soccer - AA
- Swimming and Diving - AA
- Tennis - AAA
- Track and Field - AAA
- Wrestling - AAA

Girls

- Basketball - AAA
- Cheer - AAAA
- Cross Country - AAA
- Field Hockey - AAA
- Golf - AAA
- Soccer (Fall) - AAA
- Softball - AAA
- Swimming and Diving - AAA
- Girls' Tennis - AAA
- Track and Field - AAA
- Volleyball - AAA
- Wrestling - AAA

Middle School Sports

Boys

- Basketball
- Football
- Soccer
- Track and Field
- Wrestling

Girls

- Basketball
- Field Hockey
- Softball (Fall)
- Track and Field
- Volleyball
- Wrestling

According to PIAA directory July 2013
