= Great Conewago Presbyterian Church =

Historic church in Pennsylvania, United States

- U.S. National Register of Historic Places
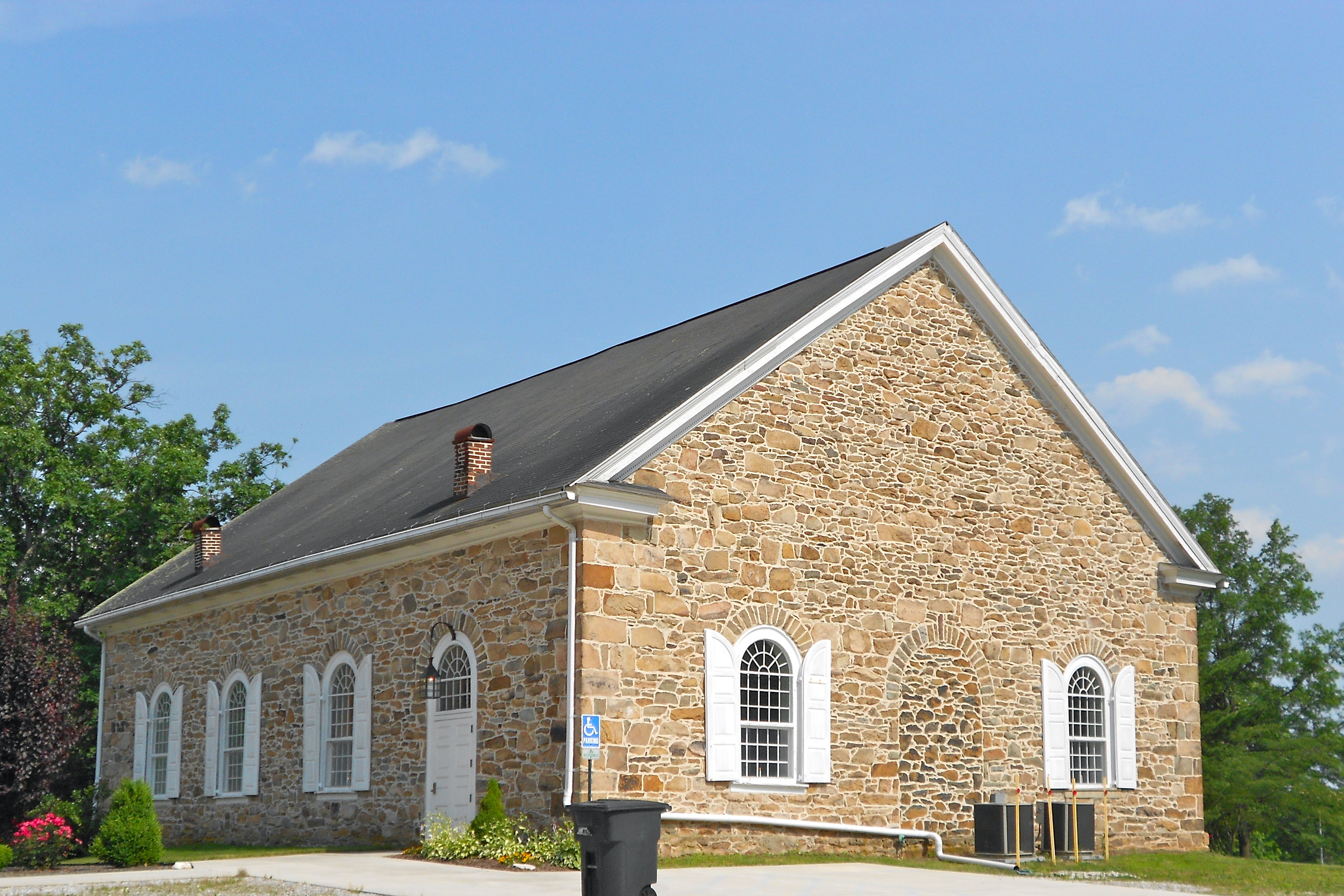

- Location within Pennsylvania Location within the United States
- Location: Church Road, near Hunterstown, Straban Township, Pennsylvania
- Coordinates: 39°53′15″N 77°9′46″W
- Area: 1 acre (0.40 ha)
- Built: 1787
- NRHP reference No.: 74001730
- Added to NRHP: December 27, 1974

The Great Conewago Presbyterian Church is an historic Presbyterian church, which is located on Church Road near Hunterstown, Straban Township, Adams County, Pennsylvania, United States.

It was listed on the National Register of Historic Places in 1974.

== History and architectural features ==
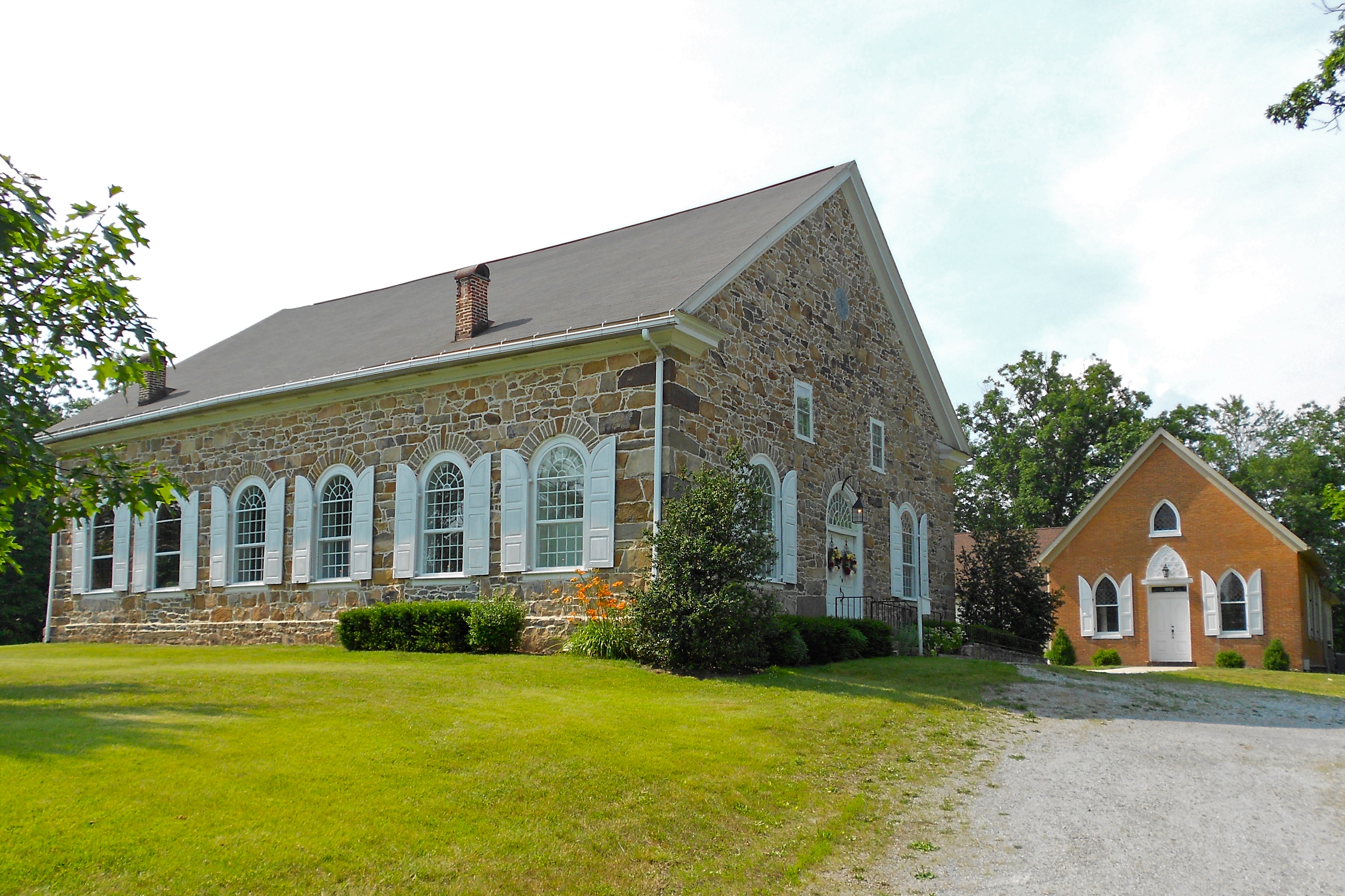
Stone church with brick chapel to the right

Built in 1787, it is a six-bay-wide and three-bay-deep rectangular fieldstone building, which features rounded arched doors and windows and a rounded arch ceiling.

During the Gettysburg campaign of the American Civil War, it was used as a Confederate Army hospital.

It was listed on the National Register of Historic Places in 1974.

The congregation is part of the Presbyterian Church (USA).
