= Highland Township, Adams County, Pennsylvania =

Township in Pennsylvania, US

Coordinates: 39°48′00″N 77°17′59″W

- Township
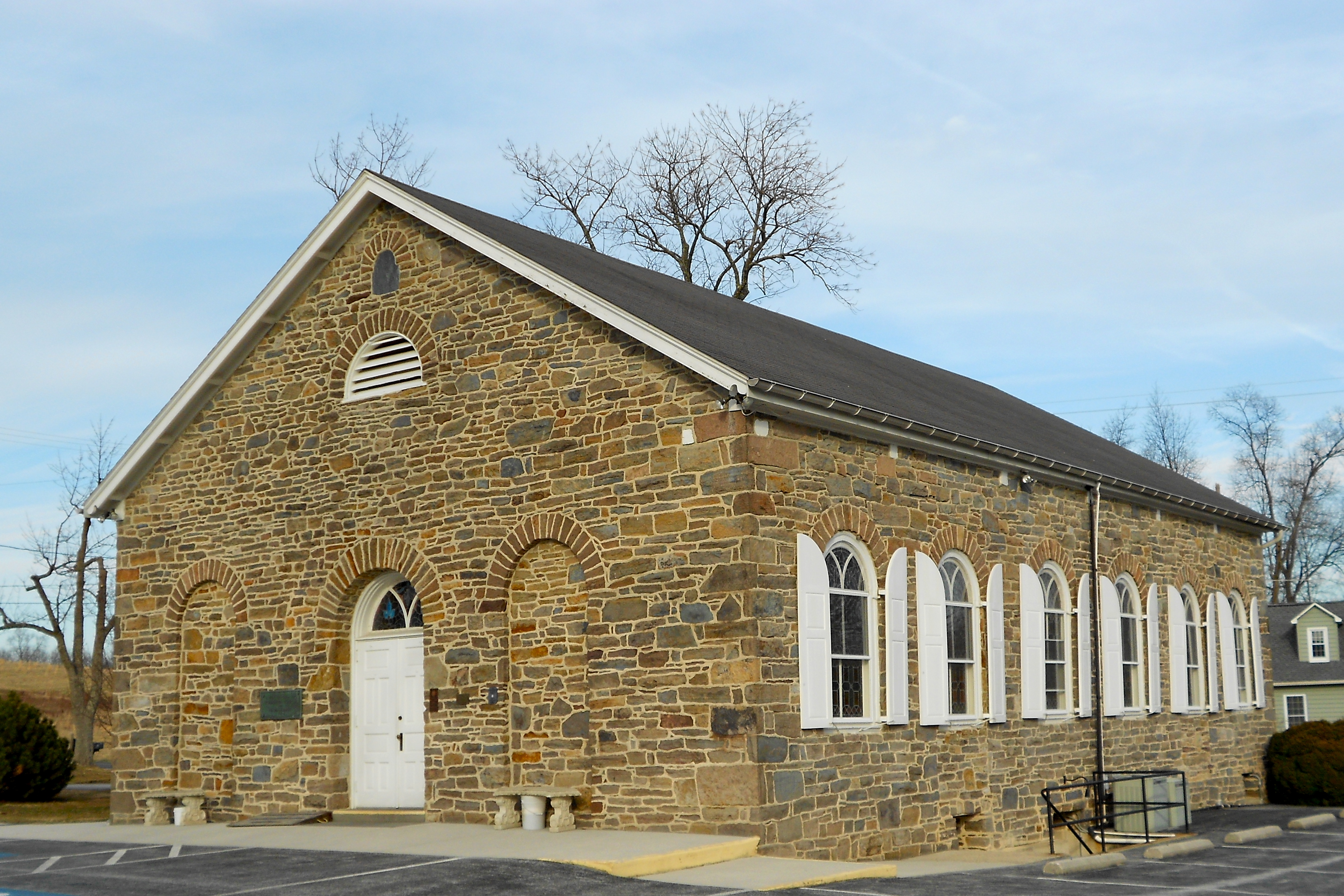
- Lower Marsh Creek Presbyterian Church, a historic site in the township

- Logo

- Location in Adams County and the state of Pennsylvania.
- Country: United States
- State: Pennsylvania
- County: Adams
- Settled: 1733
- Incorporated: 1863

Area
  - Total: 12.17 sq mi (31.52 km^{2})
  - Land: 12.14 sq mi (31.43 km^{2})
  - Water: 0.035 sq mi (0.09 km^{2})

Population (2020)
  - Total: 997
  - Estimate (2023): 1,013
  - Density: 82/sq mi (31.7/km^{2})
- Time zone: UTC-5 (Eastern (EST))
  - Summer (DST): UTC-4 (EDT)
- Area code: 717
- FIPS code: 42-001-34424
- Website: https://highland.adamscountypa.gov/

Highland Township is a township in Adams County, Pennsylvania, United States, which was created in 1863 from parts of Hamiltonban, Cumberland, and Franklin townships.

The population was 997 at the time of the 2020 census.

== Geography ==
According to the United States Census Bureau, the township has a total area of 12.2 square miles (31.5 km^{2}), of which 12.1 square miles (31.4 km^{2}) is land and 0.039 square miles (0.1 km^{2}), or 0.29%, is water. It contains part of the census-designated place of Orrtanna.

== Demographics ==
Historical population
Census	Pop.	Note	%±
2000	825		—
2010	943		14.3%
2020	997		5.7%
2023 (est.)	1,013		1.6%

As of the census of 2000, there were 825 people, 317 households, and 244 families residing in the township.

The population density was 68.0 inhabitants per square mile (26.3/km^{2}). There were 330 housing units at an average density of 27.2 per square mile (10.5/km^{2}).

The racial makeup of the township was 97.33% White, 0.12% African American, 0.61% Asian, 0.12% Pacific Islander, 0.61% from other races, and 1.21% from two or more races. Hispanic or Latino of any race were 1.45% of the population.

There were 317 households, out of which 30.9% had children under the age of eighteen living with them; 66.2% were married couples living together, 5.4% had a female householder with no husband present, and 23.0% were non-families. 18.6% of all households were made up of individuals, and 7.9% had someone living alone who was sixty-five years of age or older.

The average household size was 2.60 and the average family size was 2.98.

In the township the population was spread out, with 23.2% under the age of eighteen, 6.3% from eighteen to twenty-four, 27.6% from twenty-five to forty-four, 29.3% from forty-five to sixty-four, and 13.6% who were sixty-five years of age or older. The median age was forty-one years.

For every one hundred females, there were 98.3 males. For every one hundred females who were aged eighteen or older, there were 96.3 males.

The median income for a household in the township was $50,066, and the median income for a family was $55,694. Males had a median income of $35,188 compared with that of $27,500 for females.

The per capita income for the township was $21,834.

Roughly 1.7% of families and 4.1% of the population were living below the poverty line, including 5.5% of those who were under the age of eighteen and 3.6% of those who were aged sixty-five or older.
