= Hunterstown, Pennsylvania =

Unincorporated community in Pennsylvania, US

- Census-designated place
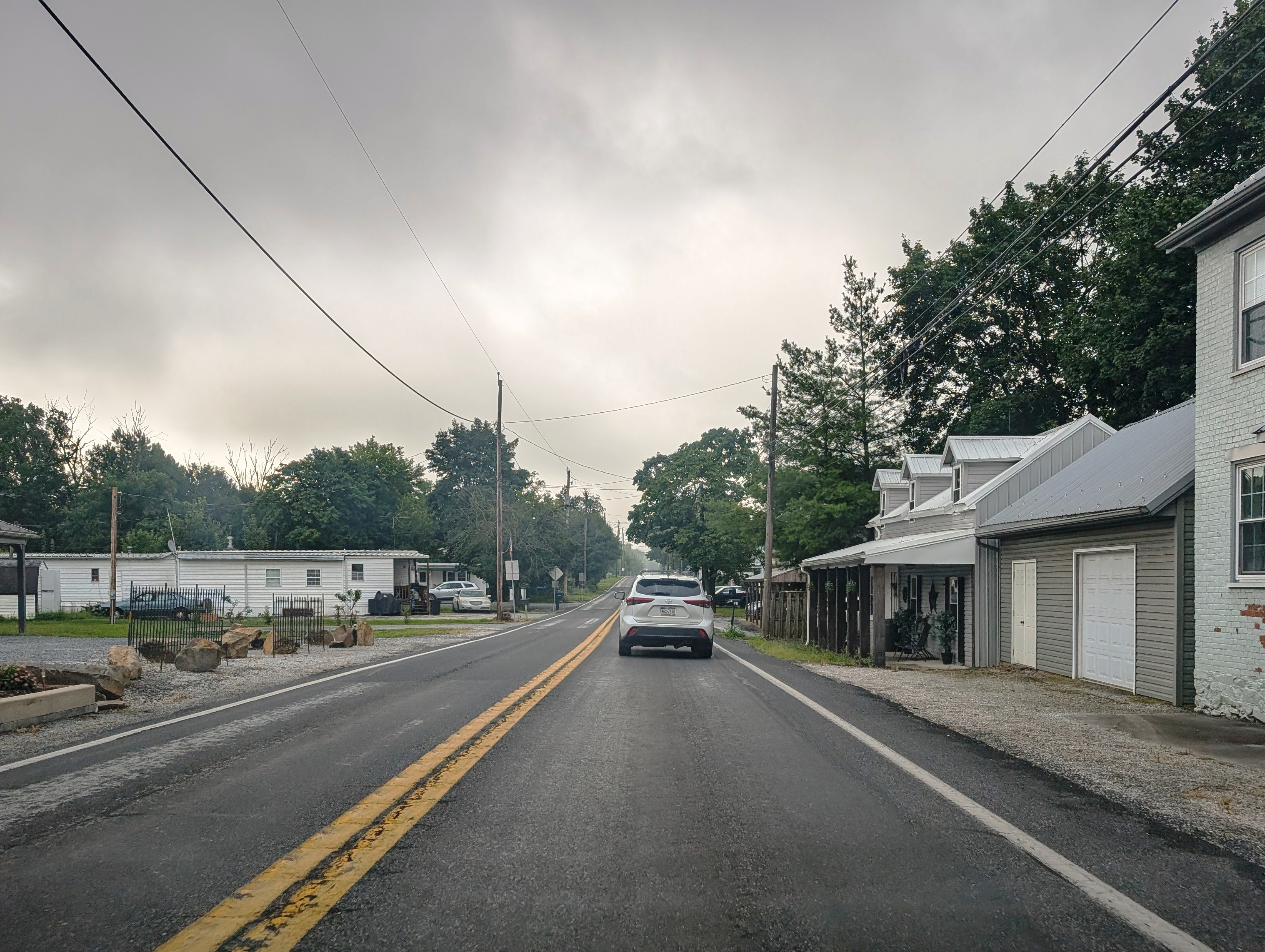
- PA 394 eastbound through Hunterstown

- Location in Adams County and the state of Pennsylvania.
- Coordinates: 39°52′56″N 77°09′37″W
- Country: United States
- State: Pennsylvania
- County: Adams
- Township: Straban

Area
  - Total: 1.73 sq mi (4.48 km^{2})
  - Land: 1.73 sq mi (4.47 km^{2})
  - Water: 0.0039 sq mi (0.01 km^{2})
- Elevation: 554 ft (169 m)

Population (2020)
  - Total: 506
  - Density: 293.5/sq mi (113.31/km^{2})
- Time zone: UTC-5 (Eastern (EST))
  - Summer (DST): UTC-4 (EDT)
- Area code: 717
- GNIS feature ID: 1177622
- FIPS code: 42-36352

Hunterstown is an unincorporated community and census-designated place in Straban Township, Pennsylvania, United States. As of the 2020 census, the population was 506.

Hunterstown is located along Pennsylvania Route 394, (Shrivers Corner Road), 5 miles (8 km) northeast of Gettysburg.

The Hunterstown Historic District and Great Conewago Presbyterian Church are listed on the National Register of Historic Places.

== History ==
During the Battle of Gettysburg in 1863, there was a brief cavalry skirmish at Hunterstown, today known as the Battle of Hunterstown.

== Demographics ==
Historical population
Census	Pop.	Note	%±
2010	547		—
2020	506		−7.5%
U.S. Decennial Census

== Education ==
It is in the Gettysburg Area School District.
