= Franklin Township, Adams County, Pennsylvania =

Township in Pennsylvania, US

Coordinates: 39°53′27″N 77°20′52″W

- Township
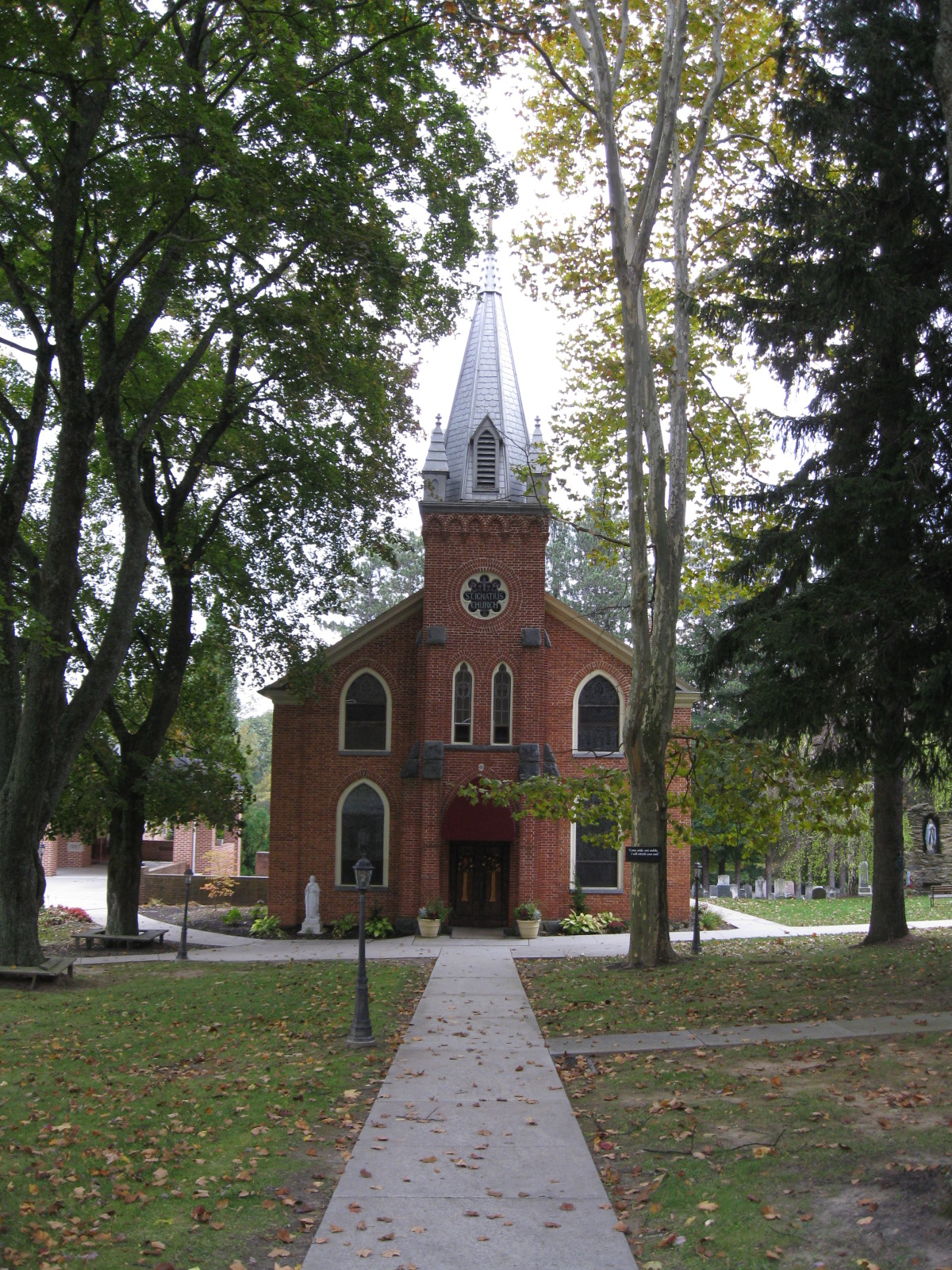
- St. Ignatius Loyola Catholic Church in the Buchanan Valley of Franklin Township

- Seal

- Location of Franklin Township in Adams County, Pennsylvania and of Adams County in Pennsylvania
- Country: United States
- State: Pennsylvania
- County: Adams
- Settled: 1738
- Incorporated: Before 1800

Area
  - Total: 68.48 sq mi (177.36 km^{2})
  - Land: 68.16 sq mi (176.54 km^{2})
  - Water: 0.32 sq mi (0.82 km^{2})

Population (2020)
  - Total: 4,671
  - Estimate (2023): 4,745
  - Density: 71.9/sq mi (27.75/km^{2})
- Time zone: UTC-5 (Eastern (EST))
  - Summer (DST): UTC-4 (EDT)
- Area code: 717
- FIPS code: 42-001-27320
- Website: www.franklintwp.us

Franklin Township is a township in Adams County, Pennsylvania, United States. The population was 4,671 at the 2020 census.

== History ==
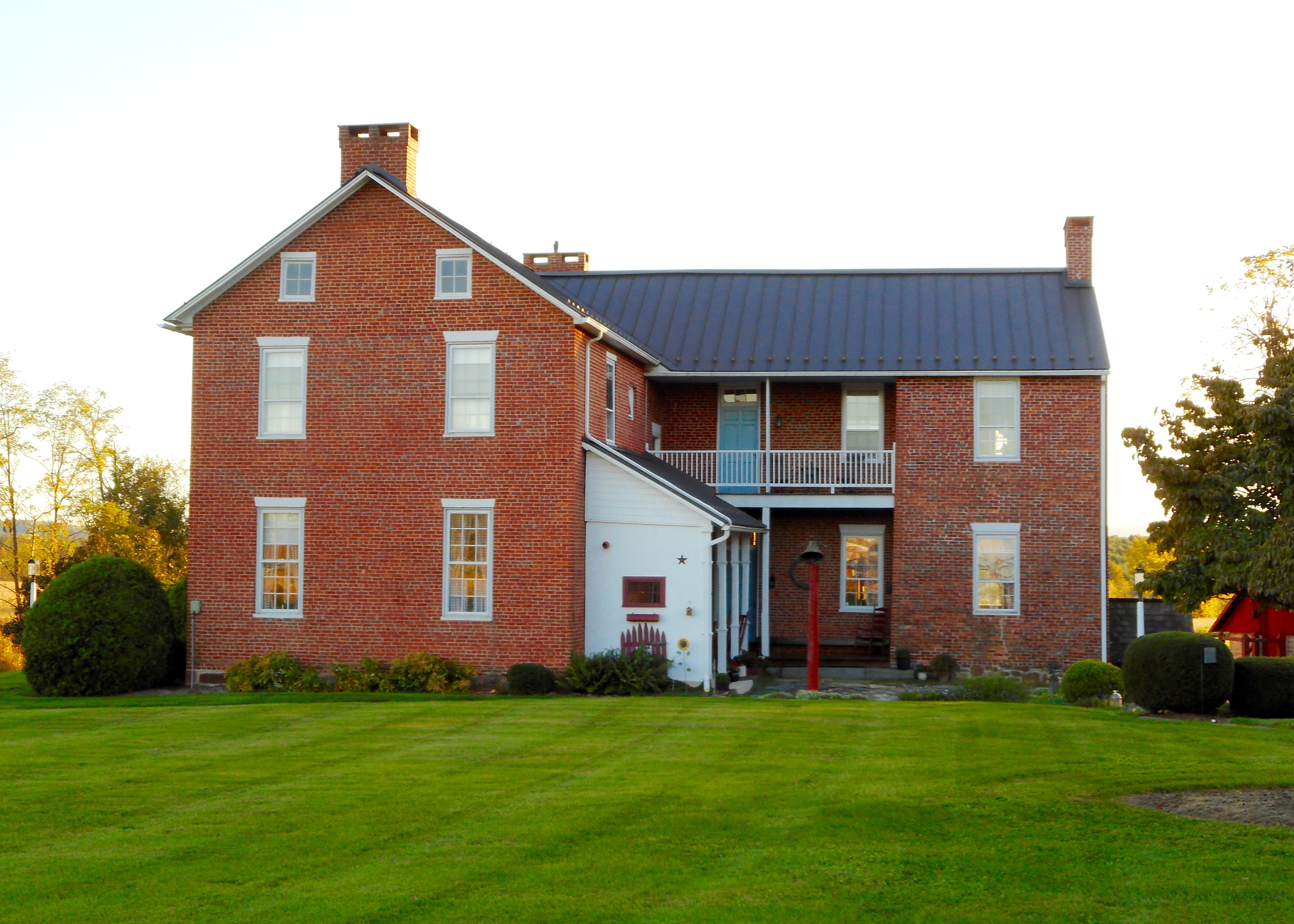
Middlekauf House, listed on the National Register of Historic Places

The township is the location of the Carbaugh Run Rhyolite Quarry Site, where Native Americans mined rhyolite for stone tools. It is an archaeological site and is listed on the National Register of Historic Places.

== Geography ==
Franklin Township occupies the northwestern portion of Adams County. The western and northern portions of the township are covered by several ridges that make up South Mountain, the northern extension of the Blue Ridge Mountains. U.S. Route 30, the Lincoln Highway, passes through the center of the township, around the northern edges of the unincorporated communities of Cashtown and McKnightstown. Along U.S. 30, it is 3.5 miles (5.6 km) from the eastern border of the township to Gettysburg and 10.6 miles (17.1 km) from the western border of the township to Chambersburg. Franklin Township is one of 21 townships in Adams County, Pennsylvania.

According to the U.S. Census Bureau, the township has a total area of 68.5 square miles (177.3 km^{2}), of which 68.1 square miles (176.3 km^{2}) is land and 0.39 square miles (1.0 km^{2}), or 0.58%, is water. Franklin Township is the largest township in area, and fourth in population, in Adams County. One-third of the township consists of State Forest. Land held by the State and Federal government is nontaxable for both the school property taxes, township taxes and county taxes.

== Demographics ==
Historical population
Census	Pop.	Note	%±
2000	4,590		—
2010	4,877		6.3%
2020	4,671		−4.2%
2023 (est.)	4,745		1.6%
U.S. Decennial Census

As of the census of 2000, there were 4,590 people, 1,651 households, and 1,264 families residing in the township. The population density was 67.1 inhabitants per square mile (25.9/km^{2}). There were 1,824 housing units at an average density of 26.7 per square mile (10.3/km^{2}). The racial makeup of the township was 93.64% White, 1.74% African American, 0.35% Native American, 0.09% Asian, 3.22% from other races, and 0.96% from two or more races. Hispanic or Latino of any race were 5.75% of the population.

There were 1,651 households, out of which 33.1% had children under the age of 18 living with them, 64.7% were married couples living together, 7.4% had a female householder with no husband present, and 23.4% were non-families. 18.8% of all households were made up of individuals, and 7.0% had someone living alone who was 65 years of age or older. The average household size was 2.67 and the average family size was 3.05.

In the township the population was spread out, with 25.2% under the age of 18, 7.1% from 18 to 24, 28.7% from 25 to 44, 25.8% from 45 to 64, and 13.3% who were 65 years of age or older. The median age was 39 years. For every 100 females, there were 99.2 males. For every 100 females age 18 and over, there were 96.6 males.

The median income for a household in the township was $44,974, and the median income for a family was $47,256. Males had a median income of $32,585 versus $20,898 for females. The per capita income for the township was $18,510. About 4.1% of families and 6.3% of the population were below the poverty line, including 5.2% of those under age 18 and 6.1% of those age 65 or over.

== Education ==
The township is in the Gettysburg Area School District.

Franklin Township Elementary School has an Orrtanna post office address, but is physically in the Cashtown CDP. This is the zoned school for Cashtown, McKnightstown, and portions of Orrtanna. The district's comprehensive middle and high schools are Gettysburg Area Middle School and Gettysburg Area High School.
