= Hamiltonban Township, Pennsylvania =

Township in Pennsylvania, US

Coordinates: 39°50′00″N 77°21′59″W

Hamiltonban Township, Adams County, Pennsylvania
- Township
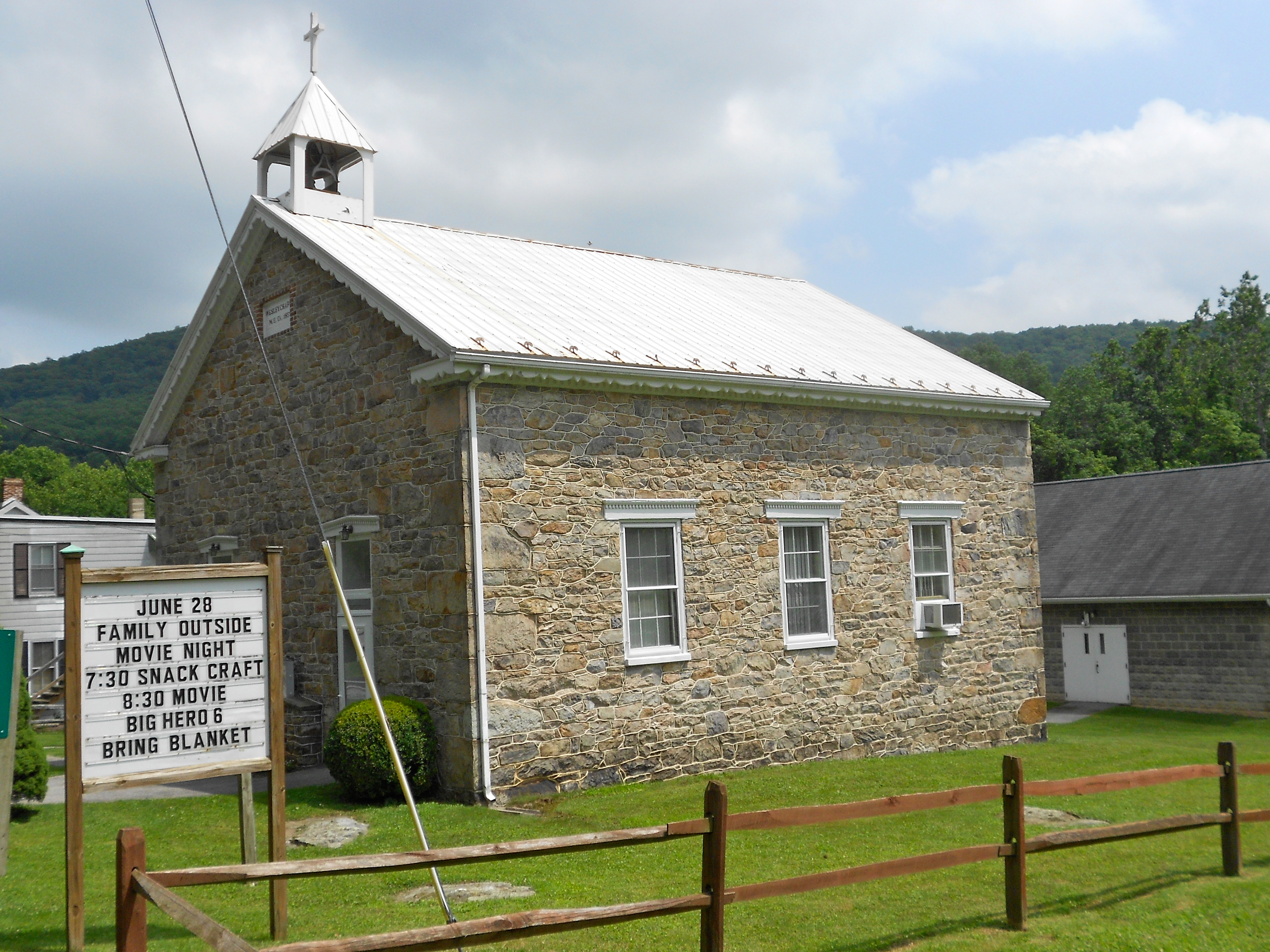
- Wesley United Methodist Church

- Seal

- Location in Adams County and the state of Pennsylvania.
- Country: United States
- State: Pennsylvania
- County: Adams
- Settled: 1741
- Incorporated: 1800

Area
  - Total: 39.28 sq mi (101.74 km^{2})
  - Land: 39.17 sq mi (101.44 km^{2})
  - Water: 0.12 sq mi (0.30 km^{2})

Population (2020)
  - Total: 2,296
  - Estimate (2023): 2,333
  - Density: 59/sq mi (22.7/km^{2})
- Time zone: UTC-5 (Eastern (EST))
  - Summer (DST): UTC-4 (EDT)
- Area code: 717
- FIPS code: 42-001-32200
- Website: Township website

Hamiltonban Township is a township in Adams County, Pennsylvania, United States. The population was 2,296 at the 2020 census.

The township is named after Hamiltonsbawn in County Armagh, Northern Ireland.

== Geography ==
According to the United States Census Bureau, the township has a total area of 39.3 square miles (101.7 km^{2}), of which 39.2 square miles (101.4 km^{2}) is land and 0.12 square miles (0.3 km^{2}), or 0.29%, is water. It contains part of the census-designated place of Orrtanna.

== Demographics ==
Historical population
Census	Pop.	Note	%±
2000	2,216		—
2010	2,372		7.0%
2020	2,296		−3.2%
2023 (est.)	2,333		1.6%
U.S. Decennial Census

As of the census of 2000, there were 2,216 people, 827 households, and 621 families residing in the township. The population density was 56.6 inhabitants per square mile (21.9/km^{2}). There were 898 housing units at an average density of 22.9/sq mi (8.8/km^{2}). The racial makeup of the township was 96.98% White, 0.23% African American, 0.27% Native American, 0.36% Asian, 0.09% Pacific Islander, 1.17% from other races, and 0.90% from two or more races. Hispanic or Latino of any race were 1.31% of the population.

There were 827 households, out of which 31.0% had children under the age of 18 living with them, 61.4% were married couples living together, 8.7% had a female householder with no husband present, and 24.8% were non-families. 19.0% of all households were made up of individuals, and 8.3% had someone living alone who was 65 years of age or older. The average household size was 2.60 and the average family size was 2.97.

In the township the population was spread out, with 23.6% under the age of 18, 5.5% from 18 to 24, 29.4% from 25 to 44, 26.7% from 45 to 64, and 14.8% who were 65 years of age or older. The median age was 40 years. For every 100 females there were 101.3 males. For every 100 females age 18 and over, there were 98.9 males.

The median income for a household in the township was $42,235, and the median income for a family was $48,750. Males had a median income of $32,250 versus $22,500 for females. The per capita income for the township was $19,344. About 4.0% of families and 7.5% of the population were below the poverty line, including 11.5% of those under age 18 and 4.8% of those age 65 or over.
