= Cashtown, Pennsylvania =

Unincorporated community in Pennsylvania, US

- Census-designated place
- Location in Adams County and the U.S. state of Pennsylvania.
- Coordinates: 39°53′2″N 77°21′31″W
- Country: United States
- State: Pennsylvania
- County: Adams
- Township: Franklin

Area
  - Total: 1.51 sq mi (3.92 km^{2})
  - Land: 1.50 sq mi (3.89 km^{2})
  - Water: 0.012 sq mi (0.03 km^{2})
- Elevation: 746 ft (227 m)

Population (2020)
  - Total: 453
  - Density: 301.3/sq mi (116.33/km^{2})
- Time zone: UTC-5 (Eastern (EST))
  - Summer (DST): UTC-4 (EDT)
- ZIP Codes: 17310
- FIPS code: 42-11576
- GNIS feature ID: 1171306

Cashtown is a census-designated place in Franklin Township, Adams County, Pennsylvania, United States. The community was part of the Cashtown-McKnightstown CDP, until it was split into two separate CDPs for the 2010 census. As of 2020, the population of Cashtown was 453.

A post office called Cashtown has been in operation since 1833. According to tradition, the community was named for the fact a local tavern owner required that all payments be made in cash.

== Geography ==
Cashtown is located west of Gettysburg in western Adams County. U.S. Route 30 bypasses the center of the community and forms the northern edge of the CDP. Old U.S. 30, the original Lincoln Highway, is the main street of Cashtown. McKnightstown is 1.5 miles (2.4 km) to the east.

== Demographics ==
Historical population
Census	Pop.	Note	%±
2020	453		—
U.S. Decennial Census

== Education ==
It is in the Gettysburg Area School District.

Franklin Township Elementary School has an Orrtanna post office address, but is physically in the Cashtown CDP. This is the zoned school for Cashtown. The district's comprehensive middle and high schools are Gettysburg Area Middle School and Gettysburg Area High School.

== Notable person ==
- Nellie V. Mark (1857–1935), physician, suffragist
