= Mount Joy Township, Adams County, Pennsylvania =

Township in Pennsylvania, US

Coordinates: 39°45′30″N 77°09′59″W

- Township
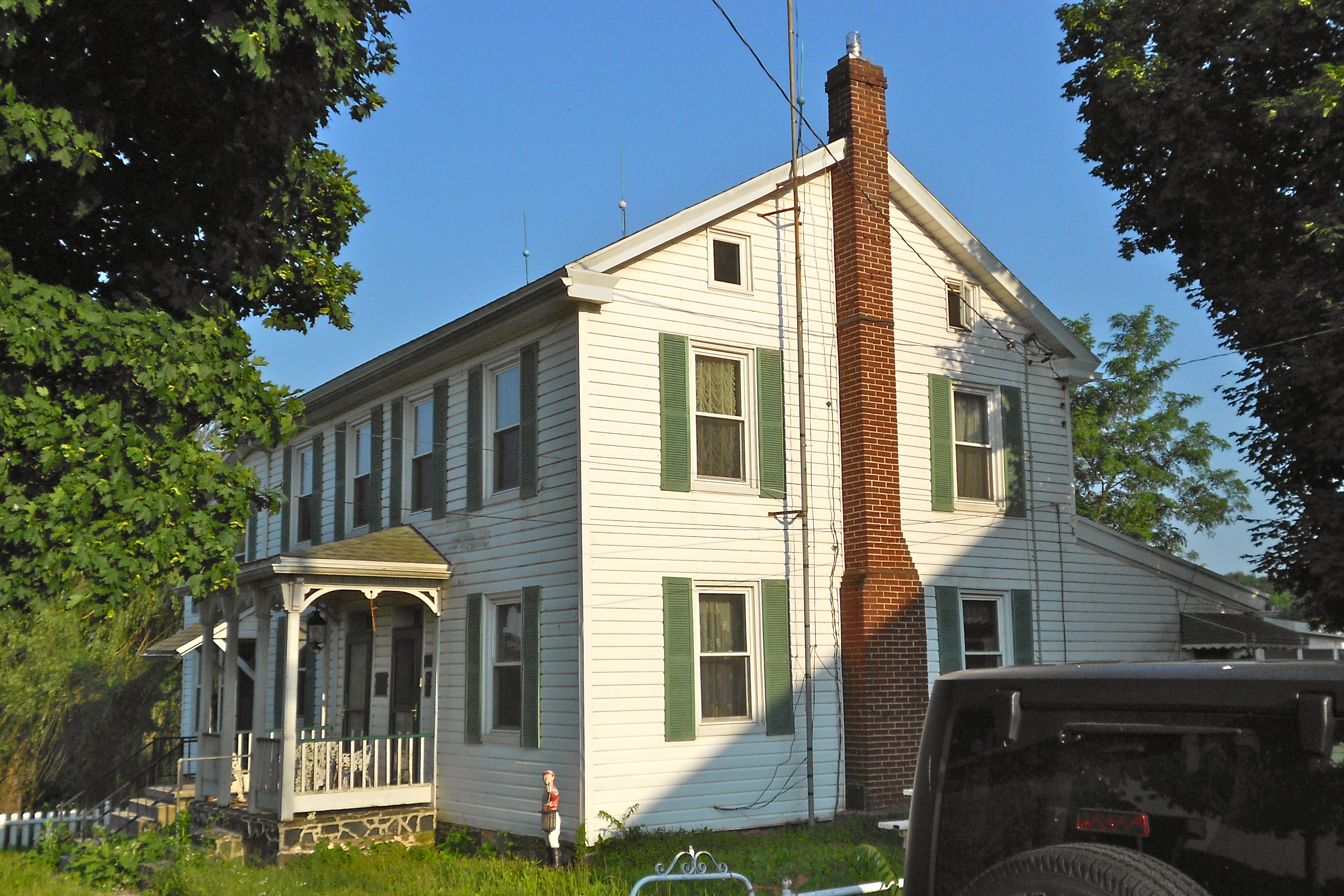
- The Spangler-Benner Farm, a historic site in the township

- Location in Adams County and the state of Pennsylvania.
- Country: United States
- State: Pennsylvania
- County: Adams
- Settled: 1749
- Incorporated: Before 1800

Area
  - Total: 26.23 sq mi (67.93 km^{2})
  - Land: 26.00 sq mi (67.35 km^{2})
  - Water: 0.22 sq mi (0.58 km^{2})

Population (2020)
  - Total: 3,782
  - Estimate (2023): 3,839
  - Density: 142.3/sq mi (54.94/km^{2})
- Time zone: UTC-5 (Eastern (EST))
  - Summer (DST): UTC-4 (EDT)
- Area code: 717
- FIPS code: 42-001-51640
- Website: www.mtjoytwp.us

Mount Joy Township is a township in Adams County, Pennsylvania, United States. The population was 3,670 at the 2010 census.

== History ==
The Pleasant Grove School and Spangler-Benner Farm are listed on the National Register of Historic Places.

== Geography ==
According to the United States Census Bureau, the township has a total area of 26.2 square miles (67.9 km^{2}), of which 26.0 square miles (67.3 km^{2}) is land and 0.23 square miles (0.6 km^{2}), or 0.86%, is water. It contains part of the census-designated place of Lake Heritage.

== Demographics ==
Historical population
Census	Pop.	Note	%±
2000	3,232		—
2010	3,670		13.6%
2020	3,782		3.1%
2023 (est.)	3,839		1.5%
U.S. Decennial Census

As of the census of 2000, there were 3,232 people, 1,191 households, and 943 families residing in the township. The population density was 124.8 inhabitants per square mile (48.2/km^{2}). There were 1,267 housing units at an average density of 48.9 per square mile (18.9/km^{2}). The racial makeup of the township was 96.38% White, 1.45% African American, 0.34% Native American, 0.46% Asian, 0.68% from other races, and 0.68% from two or more races. Hispanic or Latino of any race were 1.98% of the population.

There were 1,191 households, out of which 32.8% had children under the age of 18 living with them, 66.8% were married couples living together, 8.5% had a female householder with no husband present, and 20.8% were non-families. 17.0% of all households were made up of individuals, and 7.4% had someone living alone who was 65 years of age or older. The average household size was 2.62 and the average family size was 2.93.

In the township the population was spread out, with 27.2% under the age of 18, 5.2% from 18 to 24, 25.1% from 25 to 44, 29.0% from 45 to 64, and 13.6% who were 65 years of age or older. The median age was 40 years. For every 100 females there were 96.1 males. For every 100 females age 18 and over, there were 93.1 males.

The median income for a household in the township was $46,101, and the median income for a family was $53,802. Males had a median income of $37,068 versus $27,346 for females. The per capita income for the township was $21,181. About 2.1% of families and 3.3% of the population were below the poverty line, including 2.0% of those under age 18 and 6.2% of those age 65 or over.
