= Orrtanna, Pennsylvania =

Unincorporated community in Pennsylvania, US

- Census-designated place
- Location in Adams County and the U.S. state of Pennsylvania.
- Coordinates: 39°50′53″N 77°21′27″W
- Country: United States
- State: Pennsylvania
- County: Adams
- Townships: Hamiltonban, Highland

Area
  - Total: 0.20 sq mi (0.53 km^{2})
  - Land: 0.20 sq mi (0.53 km^{2})
  - Water: 0.0039 sq mi (0.01 km^{2})
- Elevation: 670 ft (200 m)

Population (2020)
  - Total: 183
  - Density: 902.7/sq mi (348.53/km^{2})
- Time zone: UTC-5 (Eastern (EST))
  - Summer (DST): UTC-4 (EDT)
- ZIP codes: 17353
- Area code: 717
- FIPS code: 42-57120
- GNIS feature ID: 1183049

Orrtanna is a census-designated place (CDP) in Adams County, Pennsylvania, United States. The population was 183 at the 2020 census.

== History ==
Orrtanna was established in 1885 around Orr Station, a stop on the Baltimore and Harrisburg Railway. It originally was known as Wortzville after George Wortz, a local businessman, but was changed to Orr Station and then Orr Glen. The establishment of the post office in 1892 lead to the realization that Orr Glen was already a registered town name in Pennsylvania, so the name finally became Orrtanna in 1892, for Isaiah Orr, a large property owner in the area, and a nearby tannery.

A number of businesses have existed in Orrtanna. The Orrtanna Canning Company was founded in 1913 by John S. Musselman and Ivan Z. Musselman. Notably, in October 1919, approximately 30 women apple peelers walked out of the factory as part of a general movement for greater wages in canning factories in Gardners and Biglerville. In 1949, the Orrtanna Canning Company was sold to Knouse Foods Cooperative. The Adams County Winery opened in 1975, making it the fifth oldest operating winery in Pennsylvania and Hickory Bridge Farm opened in 1977 as a bed and breakfast. The post office was closed at the end of 2010 though.

The U.S. Census Bureau began to define the Orrtanna CDP in the 2000 U.S. census.

== Geography ==
Orrtanna is located in western Adams County at 39°50′53″N 77°21′27″W (39.848021, -77.357446), at the eastern foot of South Mountain. The community is primarily in the northeastern corner of Hamiltonban Township, with a small portion extending into the northwestern corner of Highland Township.

According to the United States Census Bureau, the CDP has a total area of 0.19 square miles (0.5 km^{2}), all land.

== Demographics ==
Historical population
Census	Pop.	Note	%±
2010	173		—
2020	183		5.8%
U.S. Decennial Census

As of the census of 2010, there were 173 people and 72 households residing in the CDP. The population density was 865 inhabitants per square mile (334/km^{2}). There were 75 housing units at an average density of 375 per square mile (145/km^{2}). The racial makeup of the CDP was 99.42% White and 0.58% from two or more races.

There were 72 households, out of which 30.6% had children under the age of 18 living with them, 61.1% were married couples living together, 13.9% had a female householder with no husband present, and 25.0% were non-families. 20.8% of all households were made up of individuals, and 9.7% had someone living alone who was 65 years of age or older. The average household size was 2.40 and the average family size was 2.72.

In the CDP, the population was spread out, with 17.92% under the age of 18, 5.20% from 18 to 24, 31.21% from 25 to 44, 28.32% from 45 to 64, and 17.34% who were 65 years of age or older. The median age was 42.3 years. For every 100 females, there were 88 males. For every 100 females age 18 and over, there were 94.5 males.

The median income for a household in the CDP was $41,875, and the median income for a family was $54,063. Males had a median income of $40,000 versus $20,673 for females. The per capita income for the CDP was $21,257. About 10.6% of families and 19.9% of the population were below the poverty line, including 43.2% of those under the age of eighteen and none of those sixty five or over.

== Education ==
It is mostly in the Fairfield Area School District, with a portion in the Gettysburg Area School District.

The Gettysburg district's Franklin Township Elementary School has an Orrtanna post office address, but is physically in the Cashtown CDP. This school is the zoned elementary school for that part of Orrtanna. The Gettysburg district's comprehensive middle and high schools are Gettysburg Area Middle School and Gettysburg Area High School.
