= Danville, Hazleton and Wilkes-Barre Railroad =

The Danville, Hazleton and Wilkes-Barre Railroad, also called the D.H. & W.B. Railroad, was a railroad in northeastern Pennsylvania. It ran from Sunbury to Tomhicken, a total of 43.44 miles plus 10.1 miles of branch lines, making the whole railroad 53.54 miles long. The railroad was completed in 1870. As of 2010, the Danville, Hazleton and Willkes-Barre Railroad tracks belong to the Pennsylvania Railroad. The railroad's gauge was 4 ft 9 in (1,448 mm).

== History ==
The Danville, Hazleton and Wilkes-Barre Railroad began in April 1859 as the Wilkes-Barre and Pittston Railroad. Their plan was to build a railroad along the east side of the Susquehanna River from above Pittston to Danville or Sunbury. It was renamed the Danville, Hazleton, and Wilkes-Barre Railroad in 1867. Railroad construction began in late 1867 or early 1868. Simon P. Kase was a critical force in the building of the railroad. In 1870 an anthracite-burning locomotive was built for the railroad. By 1870, the Danville, Hazleton, and Wilkes-Barre Railroad linked Sunbury and Danville. By 1871, the railroad extended 43 miles from Sunbury to Tomhicken. In 1872, the Philadelphia and Erie Railroad started to operate the Danville, Hazleton and Wilkes-Barre tracks. In 1878, the railroad was sold under foreclosure and the name was changed to the Sunbury, Hazleton and Wilkes-Barre Railroad.

== Financial information ==
In 1888, the railroad's president was J. N. DuBarry, the secretary was Albert Hewson, and the treasurer was Taber Ashton. Many of the officers and directors of the railroad lived in Philadelphia at that time.

By 1887, the total cost of the Danville, Hazleton and Wilkes-Barre Railroad was $3,535,109. At this time, they had 20,000 shares of stock each being worth $50. Their total funded debt was $2,535,000.

== Route ==
Sunbury was the railroad's western terminus. Proceeding east, the route passed through Danville and terminated at Tomhicken. There were an additional ten miles (16 km) of branch lines.

In 1888, the D.H. & W.B. railroad, then named the Sunbury, Hazleton and Wilkes-Barre Railroad, comprised 25 bridges and trestles totalling 3,193 feet (973 m) in length. These consisted of ten wooden bridges totalling 917 feet (280 m), three stone bridges totalling 36 feet (11 m), six iron bridges totalling 264 feet (80 m), and six wooden trestles totalling 1,976 feet (602 m).

The D.H. & W.B. was laid on white oak ties and had stone cinder and culm ballast. As of 1888, the railroad had 32 at-grade highway crossings, one highway that went over the railroad, and two that went under it. None of these crossings were gated. At this time, 47.29 miles (76.11 km) of the railroad were on steel rails and 6.25 miles (10.06 km) were on iron rails.

== Stations and intersections ==
In 1871, the Lehigh Valley Railroad connected with the D.H. & W.B. in Tomhicken. The Catawissa Railroad (which later became part of the Reading Railroad) crossed the D.H. & W.B. The Philadelphia and Erie Railroad crossed the D.H. & W.B. at Sunbury.

There were a total of five railroad stations along the route. The stations included Mountain Grove Campground, (Note: In this context, "campground" refers to an area where people went over the summer for multiple religious services.) halfway between Bloomsburg and Hazleton, and Mainville.

== Uses ==
The Danville, Hazleton and Wilkes-Barre Railroad helped provide coal access to the market. The railroad was also used to transport furniture and other supplies to the Mountain Grove Campground. The railroad also carried cars full of worshipers to the Mountain Grove Campground, and sometimes even ran especially for them. In the campground's later years, the Danville, Hazleton and Wilkes-Barre Railroad carried such items as bands to the campground. The railroad provided a direct path from Sunbury to Danville, and aided communication between Danville and Sunbury. The railroad established an alternative route from the Lehigh Valley Railroad's Hazleton Branch to Sunbury.

== See also ==
- Bloomsburg and Sullivan Railroad
- Susquehanna, Bloomsburg, and Berwick Railroad
- Lackawanna and Bloomsburg Railroad
- List of Pennsylvania railroads
- Catawissa Railroad
