= David Waller (disambiguation) =

David Waller (1920–1997) was an English actor.

David Waller may also refer to:

- David Waller (priest) (born 1958), English Anglican priest
- David Waller (bishop) (born 1961), English former Anglican priest, now Catholic bishop
- David Jewett Waller Sr. (1815–1893), American Presbyterian minister and civic leader
- David Jewett Waller Jr. (1846–1941), minister and educator in Pennsylvania
