= Nathan Waller =

Nathan Waller may refer to:

- Nathan Waller (cricketer) (born 1991), Zimbabwean first-class cricketer
- Nathan Waller (soldier) (1753–1831), American Revolutionary War soldier
