= The Children's Museum =

The Children's Museum may refer to:

== India ==
- Children's Museum, Siri Fort, Siri Fort, Delhi, India

== Taiwan ==
- Children's Art Museum in Taipei

== United States ==
- The Children's Museum, Connecticut, in West Hartford
- The Children's Museum of Indianapolis, Indiana
- Boston Children's Museum, Massachusetts
- Brooklyn Children's Museum, New York
- Children's Museum of Utica, New York
- The Children's Museum (Pennsylvania), in Bloomsburg
- Seattle Children's Museum, Washington

== Venezuela ==
- Children's Museum of Caracas

== See also ==
- Children's museum, type of museum geared to children
