= Lackawanna and Bloomsburg Railroad =

Overview
- Headquarters: Scranton, Pennsylvania
- Locale: Lackawanna, Luzerne, Columbia, Montour and Northumberland Counties in Pennsylvania
- Dates of operation: 1856–1873
- Successor: Delaware, Lackawanna and Western Railroad

Technical
- Track gauge: 4 feet 8-1/2 inches (1,435 mm) (standard gauge)
- Length: 80 miles (130 km)

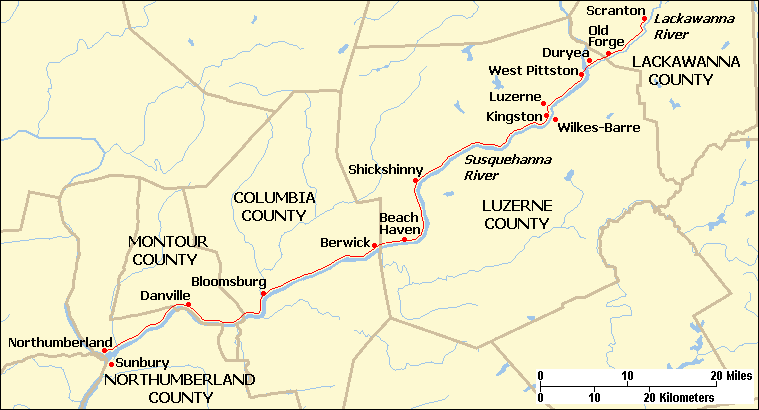
Map of the Lackawanna and Bloomsburg Railroad, showing counties and places mentioned in the article.

The Lackawanna and Bloomsburg Railroad (LBR) was an 80-mile (130 km) long 19th century railroad that ran between Scranton and Northumberland in Pennsylvania in the United States. Incorporated in 1852, the railroad began operation in 1856 and was taken over by the Delaware, Lackawanna and Western Railroad in 1873. The western end of the line, from Northumberland to Beach Haven, is still in operation as the shortline North Shore Railroad.

== Course ==
Beginning in Scranton in Lackawanna County, the Lackawanna and Bloomsburg line followed the west shore of the Lackawanna River through the Wyoming Valley, passing through Old Forge on the way to Duryea in Luzerne County. At Duryea, the Lackawanna River flows into the Susquehanna River and the railroad crossed the Susquehanna into West Pittston. The line followed the north shore of the Susquehanna River for the rest of its length, passing through Luzerne and Kingston, and crossing into Columbia County at Berwick. In Columbia County the line also passed through Bloomsburg, before crossing into Montour County and Danville there. The line ended in Northumberland in Northumberland County, where there was a connection to the Pennsylvania Railroad line. The course of the railroad is still followed closely by U.S. Route 11.

== Construction ==
The railroad was incorporated by a charter from the Pennsylvania state legislature in April, 1852. However, there were problems with the initial charter that led to amendments being made to it in 1853. Construction began in Scranton in 1854. The first line ran from Scranton to Kingston, a distance of 17 miles (27 km), and opened on the morning of June 24, 1856. The first train carried some 300 passengers and regular service ran three times a day. Kingston was an unincorporated village within Kingston Township at the time, but the increase in population led to the village incorporating as a borough less than a year and a half later, on November 23, 1857. Kingston Station was 1.5 miles (2.4 km) across the Susquehanna River from the city of Wilkes-Barre, and the increased traffic to Kingston led to the founding of the "Wilkes-Barre and Kingston Passengers Railway", chartered on April 14, 1859. This is believed to have been the first public transit line in Kingston, and operated until November 15, 1949.

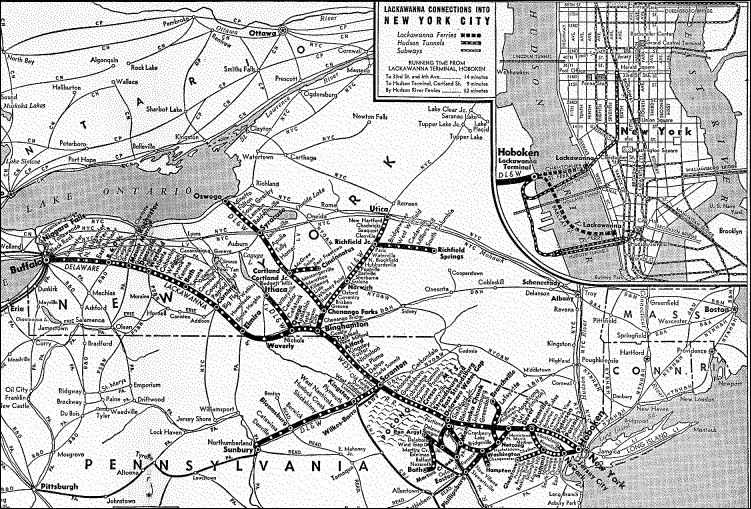
A 1922 map of the Delaware, Lackawanna and Western Railroad, successor to the Lackawanna and Bloomsburg. The line from Northumberland to Scranton is shown at bottom center.

The line reached Berwick in 1858, and was the first railroad to reach Bloomsburg in the same year. On May 31, 1860, the first locomotive from Danville reached the western terminus in Northumberland and the line was complete. The Lackawanna and Bloomsburg Railroad had 24 miles (39 km) of track by the end of 1856, built 34 miles (55 km) in 1857, and added an additional 11 miles (18 km) in 1860. The total length of the line was 80 miles (130 km).

== Operation and legacy ==
The Lackawanna and Bloomsburg carried 269,564 passengers in 1867, almost 82,000 more than its competitor, the Delaware, Lackawanna and Western Railroad. The Wyoming Valley was a major anthracite coal mining region and the railroad carried much of the coal, as well as iron ore to the Bloomsburg iron industry.

By June 1873 the line had come under the control of the Delaware, Lackawanna and Western Railroad, and became known as the Bloomsburg Branch of DL&W. The DL&W merged with the Erie Railroad in 1960, forming the Erie Lackawanna Railroad, and was absorbed into Conrail in 1976. In 1984, after Conrail decided to abandon the line, it became the short line North Shore Railroad, which runs as far as Salem Township in Luzerne County. The eastern terminus of the line is now between the village of Beach Haven and Shickshinny, east of Berwick and the Columbia County - Luzerne County line. The Western end of the line survives intact, but out of service from Pittston Junction to Kingston PA.

== See also ==
- Bloomsburg and Sullivan Railroad
- Susquehanna, Bloomsburg, and Berwick Railroad
- List of Pennsylvania railroads
- Catawissa Railroad
