= Mountain Grove Campground =

Campground in Luzerne County, Pennsylvania

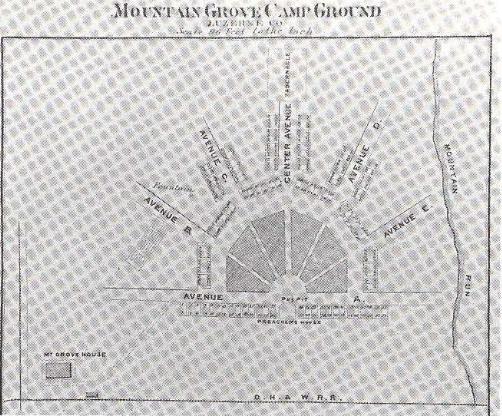
- A map of the campground that appeared in an 1876 atlas of Columbia and Montour Counties
- Interactive map of Mountain Grove Campground
- Location: Luzerne County, Pennsylvania, U.S.
- Coordinates: 40.982°N 76.213°W
- Elevation: >1000 feet
- Type: camp meeting site
- Campus size: 28 to 34 acres
- Season: August
- Established: 1872

The Mountain Grove Campground was a campground, active between 1872 and 1901, that formed part of the 19th- to early 20th-century camp meeting movement, where camping was combined with worshiping and listening to preachers. These meetings were often held by Protestants, in this case, Methodists. Mountain Grove Campground was a site and resort on the Danville, Hazleton and Wilkes-Barre Railroad in Black Creek Township, Luzerne County, Pennsylvania, in the United States. It existed for approximately 30 years and was run by the Mountain Grove Camp Meeting Association. A businessman named G.M. Shoop was the original owner of the campground's land. Many prominent citizens of the surrounding area were in the association. During the campground's operation between 1872 and 1901, it was renovated and expanded several times. While the camp meetings that were held there were intended for Methodists, non-Methodists occasionally attended them.

== Location and description ==
The Mountain Grove Campground was located approximately halfway between Bloomsburg and Hazleton. It was adjacent to the historical community of Mountain Grove, which had a population of 65 in 1880, and was located on the Danville, Hazleton and Wilkes-Barre Railroad. Most attenders came by railroad came from stations in Catawissa or Hazleton. The campground had its own railroad station and post office. The campground's elevation was more than 1,000 feet (300 m) above sea level and it was situated in a wooded grove immediately east of McCauley Mountain and in close proximity to Scotch Valley. McCauley Mountain protected the site from strong west winds.

Mountain Grove Campground was designed with a layout similar to a miniaturized version of Washington, D.C. It had a center avenue and five other avenues called A, B, C, D, and E. The center avenue ran from a large tabernacle to a living area for the preachers. There were also many tents and sites of cottages in the campground and a large administration building on the site housed a number of offices. The campground had outdoor fireplaces, which encouraged picnics. The main hall, which was constructed in 1887, was 26 by 60 feet (7.9 m × 18.3 m) and had two stories.

According to a local atlas, Mountain Grove Campground was semicircular in shape, with avenues radiating out towards the sides. An open space for worshiping was on the camp meeting site, and it was surrounded by more tents. When this area was filled up, more people would set up tents along the avenues that radiated outward from the camp.

The location of the Mountain Grove Campground was chosen was selected for several reasons. One of these was its proximity to the communities of Hazleton and Bloomsburg. By road, Bloomsburg and Hazleton were both 17 miles (27 km) from the campground. The campground was approachable by road from three directions.

== Establishment and history ==
=== Early history ===
In June 1872, G.M. Shoop, a businessman from Danville bought 28 acres of land on the site that would become the Mountain Grove Campground. He reported this purchase in a meeting held on June 20, 1872, in Columbia County with a group of Methodists, including several ministers. In this meeting, an executive committee was appointed to arrange the camp meeting. The executive committee included Reverend S. Creighton, Reverend S. Barnes (the chairman), H.E. Sutherland (the secretary), Reverend B.P. King, Reverend E.T. Schwartz, M. Hartman, J.W. Cleaver, J.W. Eyer, and G.M. Shoop himself. Shoop intended to give the land to a local camp meeting organization once one existed. This idea was well received by the district superintendent of the Methodist Church. A committee consisting of four pastors and five lay leaders was subsequently created for the camp meeting site. Craig Newton, a history professor at what would become the Bloomsburg University of Pennsylvania, stated that the site purchased by Shoop would be an ideal location for a camp meeting site.

The Danville District's presiding elder, Reverend S. Barnes, went to the Central Pennsylvania Conference in 1872 to make a report on opening the Mountain Grove Campground. He stated that the managers of the campground intended to "make it, perhaps, the best adapted and most attractive resort of its kind in all our Conference territory." Camp meeting sites had long been supported by the Central Pennsylvania Conference. The Pennsylvania legislature chartered the campground in 1873.

A professional architect was hired to design the Mountain Grove Campground. Major financial contributors to the campground included a Colonel Jackson from Berwick and the Low family from Lime Ridge. It was under the auspices of the Pennsylvania Conference of the Methodist Episcopal Church's Danville District. The campground was initially laid out hurriedly, being constructed in less than two months. It opened for the first time on August 14, 1872. By this point, approximately 70 small and hastily constructed cottages (referred to as tents) had been built. Between the 1872 camp meeting season and the 1873 camp meeting season, the buildings of the campground were significantly renovated. Three more acres and a hotel were also added to the campground during this time, on land bought from George W. Klase. The purpose of the purchase was to stop the sale of alcoholic drinks within two miles of the campground. Between 1873 and 1874, further additions were made to the campground. In 1875, a special train started to run past the campground three times a week during the camp meeting season. By 1881, the special train ran past the campground once per day. In 1884, the Pennsylvania Railroad and the Philadelphia and Reading Railway began selling special fair excursion tickets for the campground. The campground was extended to 34 acres by 1885. The Lehigh Valley Railroad began doing so as well in 1887.

In the beginning of the operation of Mountain Grove Campground, the majority of people traveling there were worshipers. In the 1870s and 1880s, the campground was one of the three largest camp meeting sites that residents of Columbia County attended. In 1875, approximately 2500 people attended the camp meeting. In 1881, it was decided that all the profit generated from the campground would be dedicated to expansion and improvement of it. In 1891, the duration of the camp meeting was increased from seven to thirteen days. However, some people traveled there for a vacation. Within 20 years of the campground's opening, the majority of the people going there were there for a vacation, and trains carried bands and other entertainment-related items to the campground. However, people still continued to go there in large numbers for camp meeting. Local newspapers also began to advertise the campground as a resort instead of a camp meeting site. This began with an advertisement written by John R. Rote, secretary of the Mountain Grove Camp Meeting Association, in the Columbia County Republican on July 9, 1891.

The Mountain Grove Campground was affected relatively little by storms, as compared to other camp meeting sites in the area. However, in 1889, attendance of the camp meeting was significantly affected by inclement weather.

=== Expansions and renovations ===
Between the 1872 and 1873 camp meeting seasons, the cottages, also known as tents, in the Mountain Grove Campground were renovated. The renovations included enlarging the tents to dimensions of 9 by 18 feet (2.7 m × 5.5 m). Roofs with singled combs were also installed during this renovation. The stairways on the cottages were also improved during this time.

Between the 1873 and the 1874 camp meeting seasons, the Mountain Grove Camp Meeting Association added more tents to the campground, increasing their number to almost 200. They also built a boarding house above the dining hall and a tabernacle was constructed across from the auditorium.

Several more expansions and renovations were made to the Mountain Grove Campground in the 1880s. In 1883, the boarding house was expanded and in 1885, a number of water pipes were renovated and some buildings were repaired and repainted. The main office of the campground was built in 1887. More renovations were done in 1889 and 1892, by which time there were 240 tents.

In the 1900, a final attempt to increase the attendance of the camp meetings at Mountain Grove Campground was made by the Board of Managers. As well as general renovation, this included an addition of a building called the Preacher's Home, which was situated behind the auditorium. The purpose of this was to attract preachers to attend, thus inspiring locals to attend as well. This plan was not successful.

=== Decline and later history ===
As railroads began to become more common, attendance of the Mountain Grove Campground began to decline. The attendance of the campground dropped severely in 1891. On July 9, 1891, the campground placed an unusually large advertisement in a local newspaper. Attendance continued to drop in 1892. The decline continued, despite efforts by the campground directors to increase the number of Chautauqua speakers and religious speakers. Attempts were made throughout the 1890s to stave off the impending failure of the campground, but were largely unsuccessful. Later, the Board of Managers decided that they would open the campground specifically for special events, such as the Bloomsburg Methodist Church's plans for an eleven-car special train to carry picnickers and a band there. By the mid-1890s, it was permitted for visitors to bring their own supplies, rent multiple tents, and decide whether to stay for one or two weeks. A short branch line of the Danville, Hazleton, and Wilkes-Barre Railroad was then built to allow easier transport of visitors' baggage to the campground. Baggage carrying was also done for free and the attendance fee was also reduced. Only one of the twenty-five prominent local families who attended the camp meeting in the 1880s still attended it in the 1890s.

However, one of the last camp meetings there, in 1900, was referred to as "interesting and profitable", although attendance had significantly dropped between 1898 and 1899. When the campground closed for the season in 1901, no plans were made to reopen it in 1902. The campground directors then attempted to sell the land to the Pennsylvania Railroad, but they were unsuccessful. In 1903, a farmer bought the land and the tents, buildings, and platforms were all purchased by various individuals. These items had all been sold within 18 months of the abandonment of the campground. The last sign of the campground's existence was its boardwalk, which eventually rotted away.

The area where the Mountain Grove Campground used to be contains sump holes and scrub.

The Mountain Grove Campground was stated in the 1950s by Charles A. Johnson to be a "new-fashioned camp meeting". The newspaper editor James C. Brown stated that it was "one of the most delightful resorts in Pennsylvania".

=== Campground visits and attendance ===
Camp meetings at the Mountain Grove Campground was held for seven to ten days each August. Several thousand people would attend the camp each year. By 1878, campground attendance on Saturdays had reached 4000 to 5000 people. The percentage of attendees who stayed for the whole duration of the camp meeting, as opposed to only part of it, also decreased during the 1890s.

== The camp meetings ==
Camp meetings at the Mountain Grove Campground began at 7:30 p.m. on a Wednesday night with a bell that summoned the attendees to a welcome sermon. From Thursday through Saturday, days of camp meeting consisted of a prayer period at 8:30 a.m., a sermon at 10:30 a.m., a service for children at 1:30 p.m., and a second sermon at 3:30 p.m. A third sermon would be delivered by a minister from another district at 7:30 p.m. On Sundays, the day began with an "experience day" at 8:20 a.m. Other than that, Sundays were similar to other days, except that an acclaimed visitor would give a sermon at 3:00 p.m. The three days after that followed the same schedule as Thursdays through Saturdays. The camp meetings were closed at 12:30 p.m. on Thursday.

Following the increase in the length of the camp meeting to 13 days, the schedule was adjusted. Thursday was designated as a temperance day. The following days were, in chronological order, designated as a Chautauqua Day, a missionary day, a Sunday School and Epworth League day, and eight days of other religious events. The meetings concluded in the campground's auditorium.

The Mountain Grove Camp Meeting Association added a Chautauqua Day to the camp meeting in 1885, and it became highly popular. It occurred on the first Thursday of the meeting. A number of people, including Lyman Abbot, frequented the Chautauqua Days as a speaker. To keep them from interfering with other camp meeting activities, the day was moved to the Tuesday before the official start of the meeting in 1886, but in 1889, it was moved to the first Wednesday.

== Financial information and leadership ==
The Mountain Grove Camp Meeting Association was formed after a decision by a nine-man committee. It was decided on August 19, 1872, that the company would be a joint-stock company. Its capital stock in 1873 was $14,000. G.M. Shoop was a significant stockholder in the company. He was the manager of the campground and the association secretary during the 1870s. High-ranking members of the Mountain Grove Camp Meeting Association during the 1870s included Presiding Elder Barnes, Reverend S. Creighton, and the businessmen and politicians B.G. Welch, Mordecai W. Jackson, and A.J. Ammerman. The newspaper editor E.M. Wardin was also prominent within the association. In the early 1880s, the businessmen E.M.M. Low, Z.T. Fowler, and Lloyd T. Sharpless also became prominent in the association. The campground typically grossed approximately $4,000 per year during the 1880s.

In 1885, the Mountain Grove Camp Meeting Association created a Chautauqua department. W.M. Gearhart was the initial president of this department and S.C. Jayne was the initial secretary.

== See also ==
- 1872 in the United States
