= Phineas Waller =

Pennsylvanian farmer and landowner

- Born: January 31, 1774; Wilkes-Barre, Pennsylvania
- Died: June 3, 1859 (aged 85); Bloomsburg, Pennsylvania
- Occupations: farmer and distiller; later landowner and postmaster

Phineas Waller (January 31, 1774 – June 3, 1859) was an American landowner and the father of David Jewett Waller Sr. In the first part of the 1800s, he worked as a farmer and distiller, but in 1823, he moved to his father's farm in Oaquago, New York. While in New York, he created the failed village of Wallersville and attempted to build a bridge across the Susquehanna River. In 1836, he returned to Pennsylvania and purchased a number of tracts of land.

== Early life ==
Waller was born on January 31, 1774, in Wilkes-Barre. He was the first child of Nathan Waller and Elizabeth (Weeks) Waller. When he was an infant, at the beginning of the American Revolutionary War, his family temporarily relocated to Connecticut.

By 1799, Waller was one of 121 taxable residents in an area in and around Wilkes-Barre, which was then a village.

== Career ==
In April 1816, Waller was one of three viewers of the second petition to create a new township in Luzerne County, Pennsylvania, Dallas Township. The other two viewers were Anderson Dana and David Richard. While in the Wilkes-Barre area, Waller was a farmer and distiller. He was listed as such on an 1818 directory of Wilkes-Barre businessmen.

Waller gained land in the vicinity of Wilkes-Barre and built a home there, but moved to his father's farm near Oquago, New York (also known as Windsor) in 1823. His children David Jewett and Nathan P. were left in Pennsylvania, but occasionally came to visit his farm. He also mined iron ore and coal while in the area. Additionally, he developed the village of Wallersville and gained approval for a post office by that name. He served as the postmaster from 1831 to 1836. To enhance the area's postal service, he established a line of mail coaches running from Utica, New York, to New York City via Oquago and Mount Pleasant, Pennsylvania. The village of Wallersville never succeeded and its post office was closed in 1836. Waller also attempted to construct a toll bridge across the Susquehanna River at Wallersville. However, this endeavor failed and a similar bridge was built further upriver by others.

In 1836, Waller sold his farm to his son Nathan P. and returned to the Wyoming Valley, where he purchased some more tracts of land. By the time of his death, he owned a considerable amount of land in the Wyoming Valley, including two or more coal mines. His heirs were surprised by the size of the distribution that they gained from his estate.

== Personal life and death ==
Waller first married Hannah Bradley on January 2, 1800. They had three children: Abraham Bradley (1800–1867), Nathan P. (1807–1884), and William Lindsey (1810–1887). Hannah Bradley died while the third child was still an infant. On March 31, 1814, Waller married Elizabeth Jewett, of New London, Connecticut. They had several more children: David Jewett (1815–1893), Harriet (1817–1887), Charles P. (1819–1862), George G. (1821–1888), and Martha (1825–1826). All three sons from this union would go on to become prominent figures.

After the death of his wife in February 1859, Waller went to Bloomsburg, Pennsylvania to live with his son David Jewett. Phineas Waller died in Bloomsburg on June 3, 1859, at the age of 85.
