= Bloomsburg Historic District =

Historic district in Pennsylvania, United States

- U.S. National Register of Historic Places
- U.S. Historic district
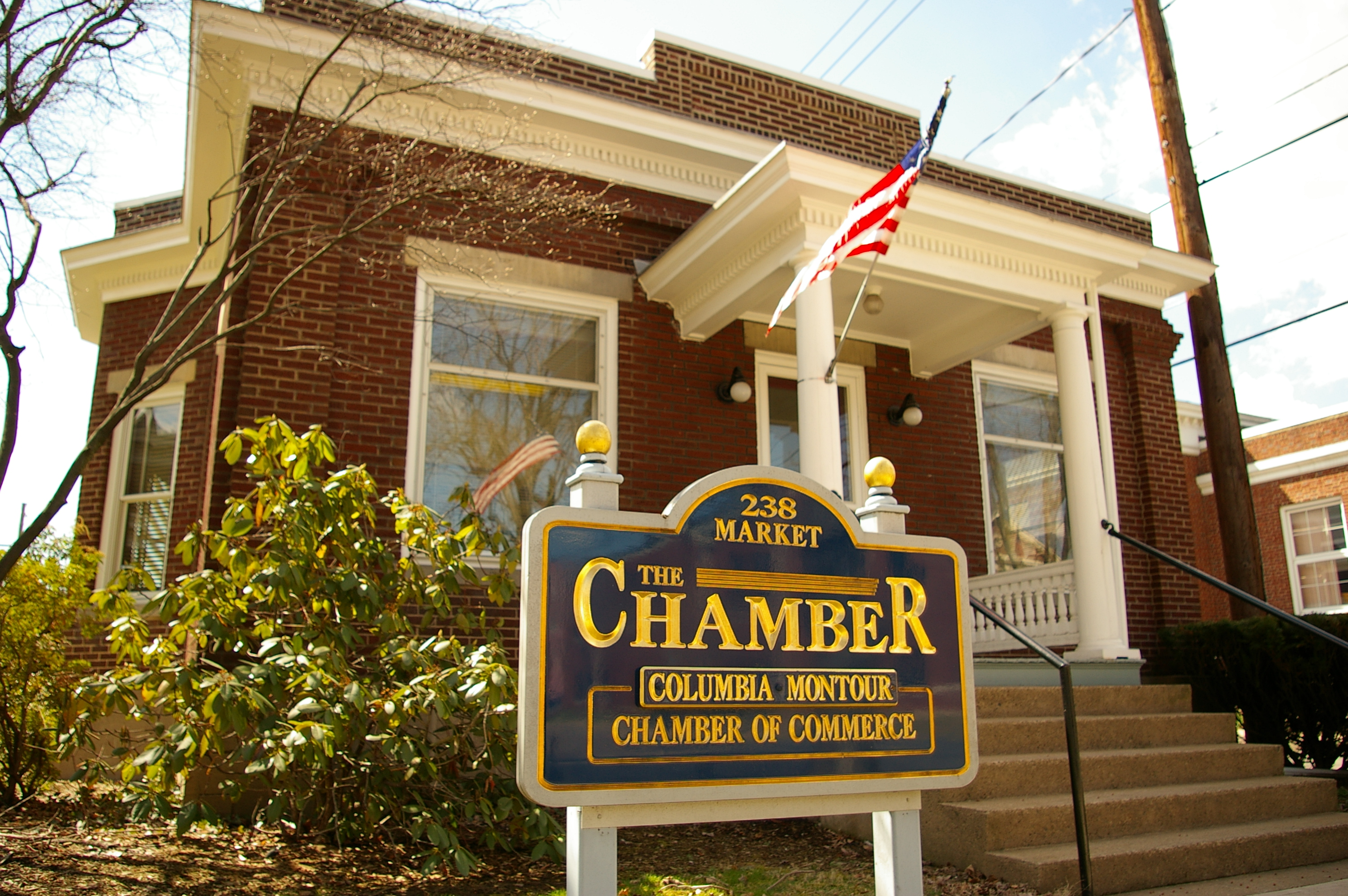
- Bloomsburg Chamber of Commerce, April 2007

- Location within Pennsylvania Location within the United States
- Location: Roughly bounded by Penn, 5th, West, Willow, Millville and Light Sts., Bloomsburg, Pennsylvania
- Coordinates: 41°00′09″N 76°27′13″W
- Area: 158 acres (64 ha)
- Built: 1845
- Architect: Multiple
- Architectural style: Colonial Revival, Mixed (more Than 2 Styles From Different Periods)
- NRHP reference No.: 83002229
- Added to NRHP: September 8, 1983

Bloomsburg Historic District is a national historic district located at Bloomsburg, Columbia County, Pennsylvania, USA. The district includes 668 contributing buildings, 1 contributing site, and 1 contributing object in the central business district and surrounding residential areas of Bloomsburg. Notable non-residential buildings include the Carver Hall at the Bloomsburg University of Pennsylvania (c. 1867), Courthouse, town hall, and St. Paul's Episcopal Church.

It was added to the National Register of Historic Places in 1983.

== Gallery ==
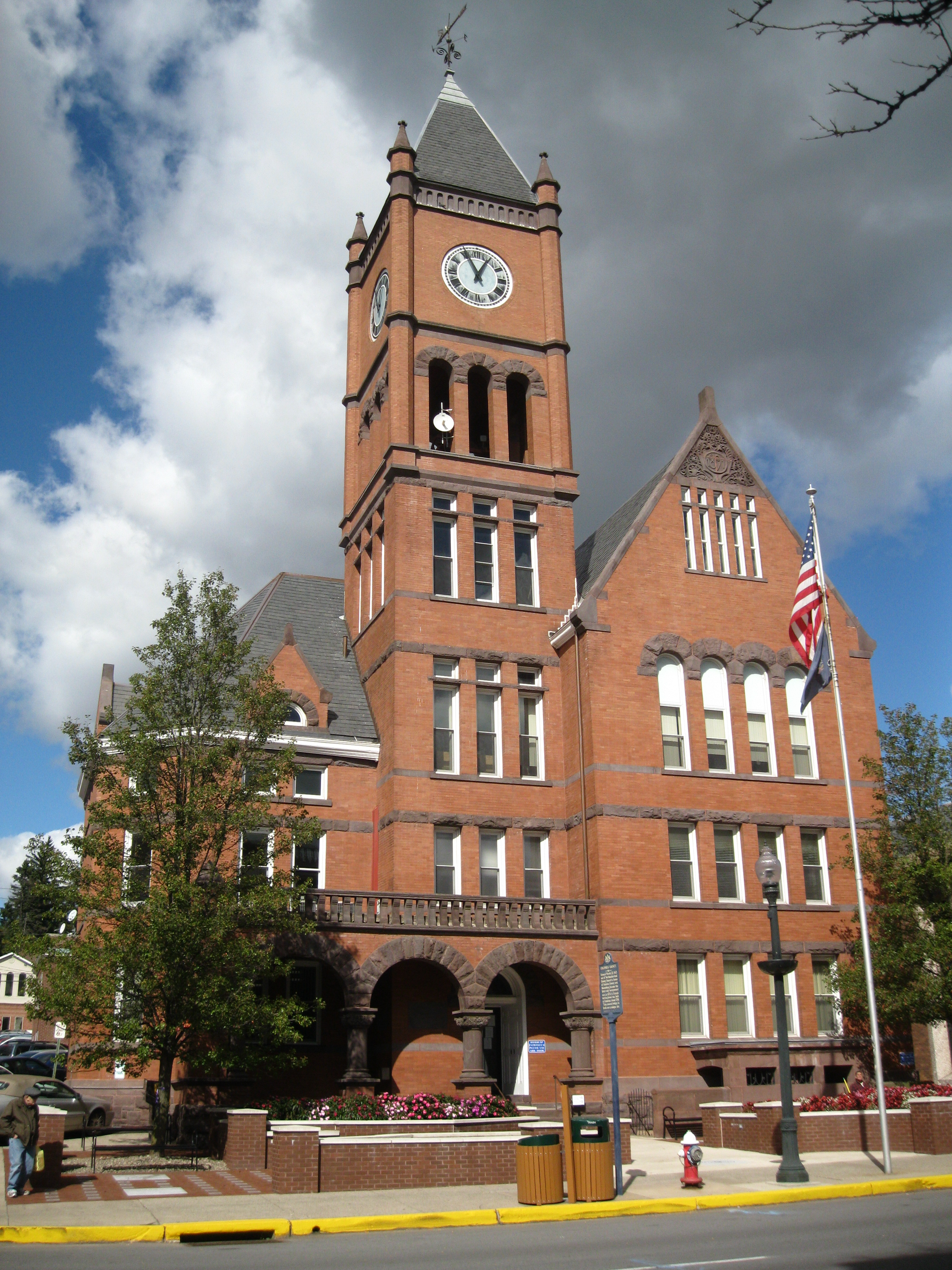
Courthouse

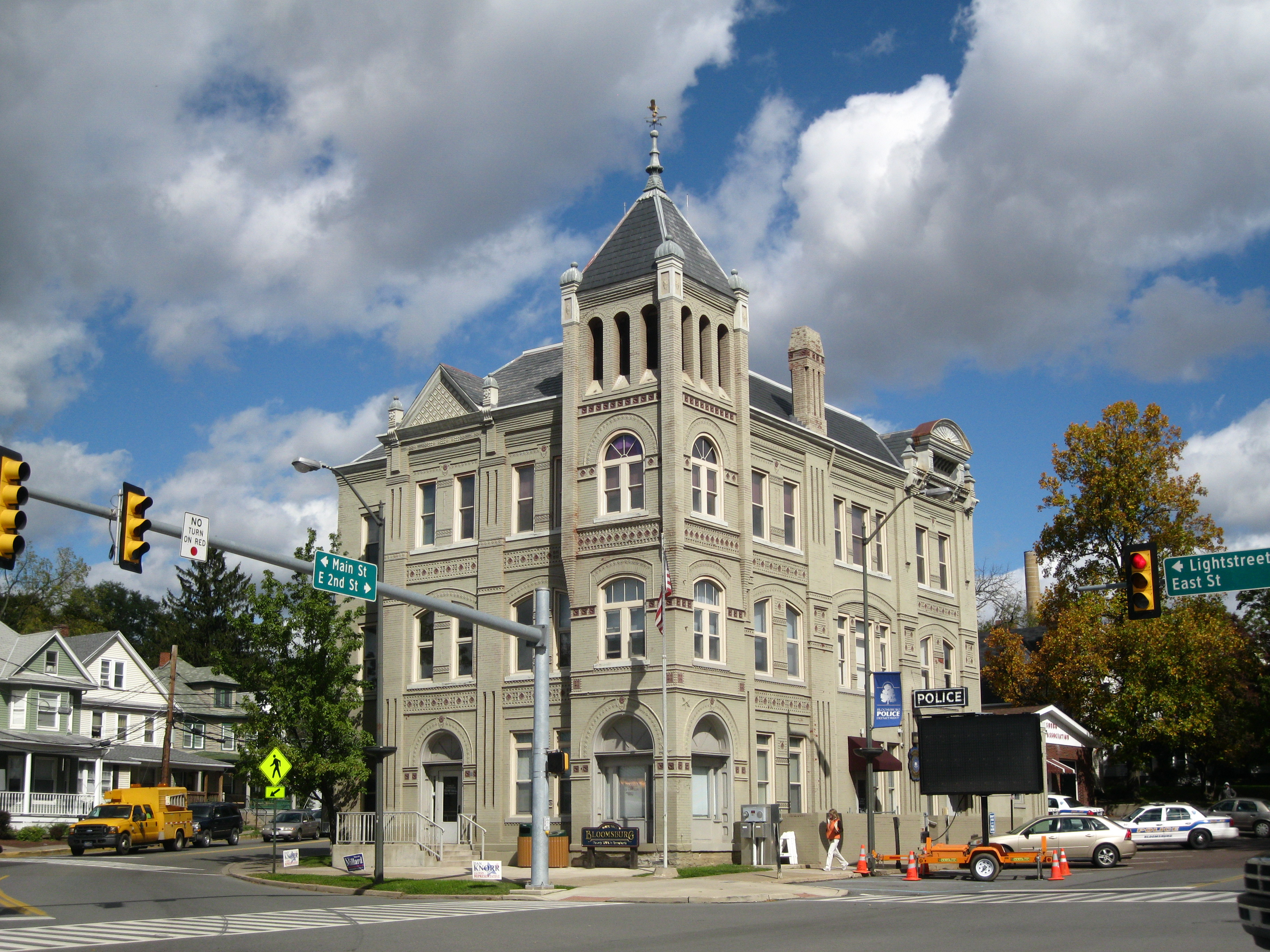
Town Hall

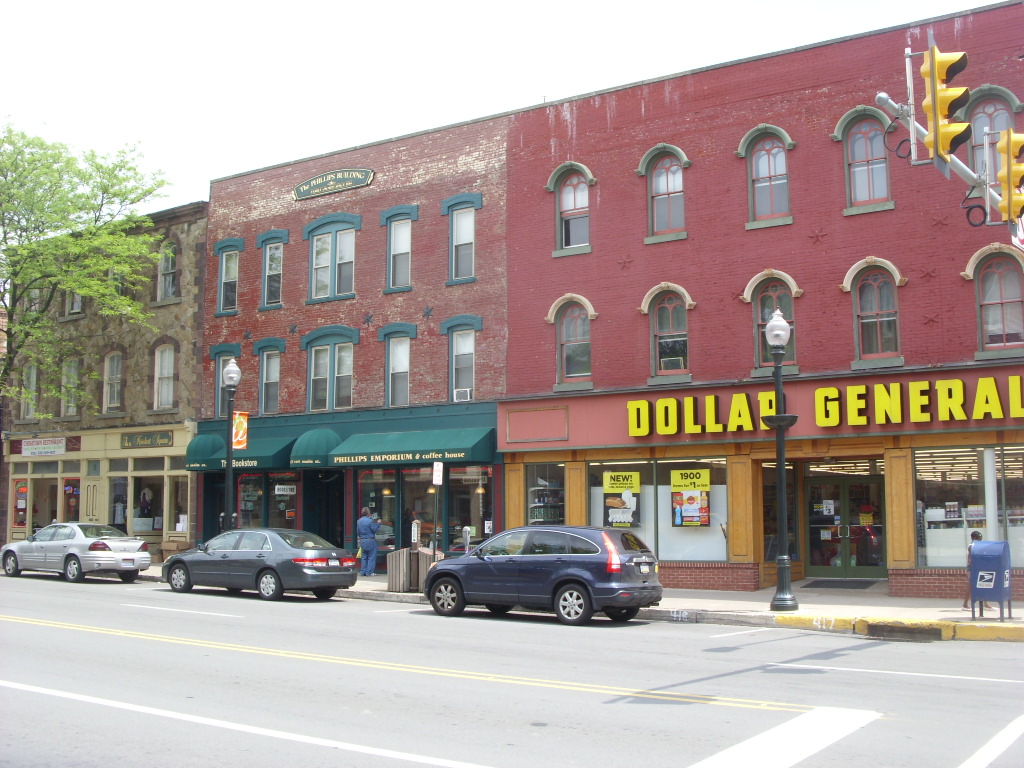
Downtown

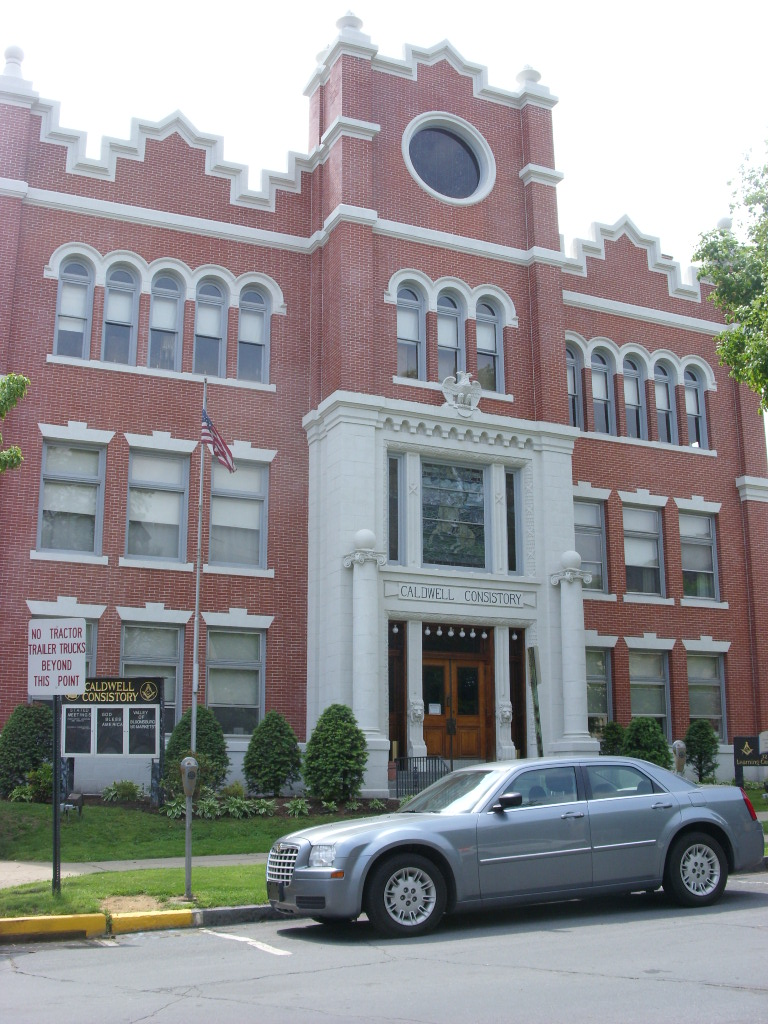
Caldwell Consistory
