= Turkey Hill (Pennsylvania) =

Hill in Pennsylvania, United States

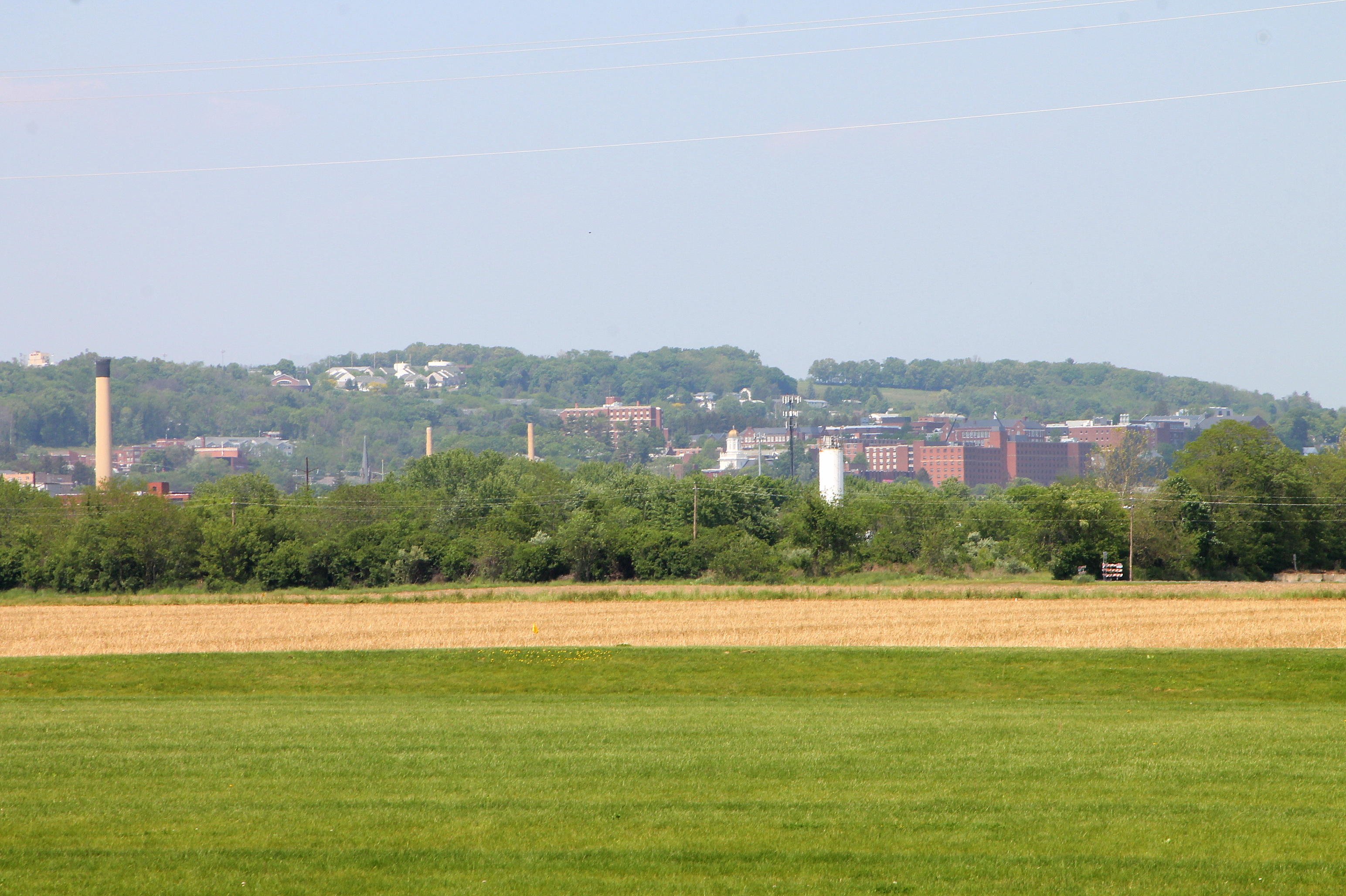
- Part of Turkey Hill as seen from the Streater Fields in Bloomsburg

Highest point
- Elevation: 942 ft (287 m)
- Prominence: 378 ft (115 m)
- Coordinates: 41°01′04″N 76°26′39″W

Geography
- Topo map: Bloomsburg

Geology
- Mountain type: hill

Turkey Hill is a hill in Columbia County, Pennsylvania, in the United States. It has an elevation of 942 feet (287 m) above sea level. The hill has a flat plateau at the top, but steep slopes on its northern, western, and southern sides. The western and southern parts of the hill have some residential development, while the northern side is mostly forested. The views it provides of the surrounding area have been described as "striking" and "breathtaking".

== Geography ==
Turkey Hill has an elevation of 942 feet (287 m) above sea level. It is mainly situated within Bloomsburg and Scott Township; its highest point is in Scott Township. The hill is entirely within the United States Geological Survey quadrangle of Bloomsburg. It has a topographic prominence of approximately 378 feet (115 m). The hill is part of a larger geographic formation known as Montour Ridge, which begins as a moderately sized hill west of Berwick and runs west, eventually becoming a mountain.

In Walter M. Brasch's 1982 book Columbia County Place Names, Turkey Hill is described as being a large hill. However, a number of housing developments and streets have been constructed on the hill, making parts of it difficult to recognize as a hill. The hill is bordered by Fishing Creek on two sides. Turkey Hill is topped by a relatively flat plateau. However, there are steep slopes on the southern, northern, and western sides of the hill.

The Turkey Hill Anticline passes through Turkey Hill in a west-southwest to east-northeast direction, heading towards the Berwick area. There are areas with slopes of 25 percent or higher in the vicinity of the Turkey Hill Oxbow. The area in the vicinity of the oxbow contains the floodplain of the former course of Fishing Creek.

== Geology ==
The bedrock geology in the highest elevations of Turkey Hill consists of the Upper Member of the Rose Hill Formation, which dates to the Middle Silurian. This rock formation consists of sandstone, limestone, and shale and ranges in color from a light olive gray to a medium gray. This formation is 130 feet (40 m) thick. The Center Member of the Rose Hill Formation occurs on a few lower-elevation areas in the vicinity of the hill. It also dates to the Middle Silurian and contains gray-red-purple to dusky red hematitic sandstone that is interbedded with silty clay shale. This formation is 60 feet (18 m) thick. The Lower Member of the Rose Hill Formation occurs on the westernmost extremity of the hill. The Keefer Formation and the Mifflintown Formation also common on the hill, but at lower elevations than the Lower Member of the Rose Hill Formation. They also date to the Middle Silurian.

== History ==
The earliest names by which Turkey Hill was referred to are no longer known. The hill probably received its current name in the late 19th century from a large turkey farm nearby.

In the 19th century, a school/geographical district in the northwestern part of Scott Township was named Turkey Hill District after Turkey Hill. In the late 1960s, the Bloomsburg State College (now Bloomsburg University) constructed an upper campus on Turkey Hill. In addition to this, several farms, including a flower plantation, were in business on the hill as late as the 1970s. Housing developments have also been present on the southern and western parts of the hill since at least the 1970s.

In a 1974 report, the plateau at the top of Turkey Hill was said to be one of the most developable area in Bloomsburg. Turkey Hill has been said to provide a "striking view" of part of the Susquehanna River valley. Views from hillside neighborhoods in the area have been described as "breathtaking". However, a 1974 report noted that the poor layout of streets in the area leads to accessibility and safety problems.

== Biology ==
Turkey Hill possesses some forested slopes; nearly all of the northern side of the hill is forested. Between these forested slopes and Interstate 80 lies an oxbow lake of Fishing Creek, known as the Turkey Hill Oxbow. On the nearby slopes, there is a forest of hemlock and hardwood trees. There are also several skunk cabbage seeps on the slope. Near the oxbow, there are forested wetlands, shrub swamps, graminoid openings, and areas of open water.

== See also ==
- List of mountains of Pennsylvania
