= Bloomsburg and Sullivan Railroad =

Former railroad in Pennsylvania

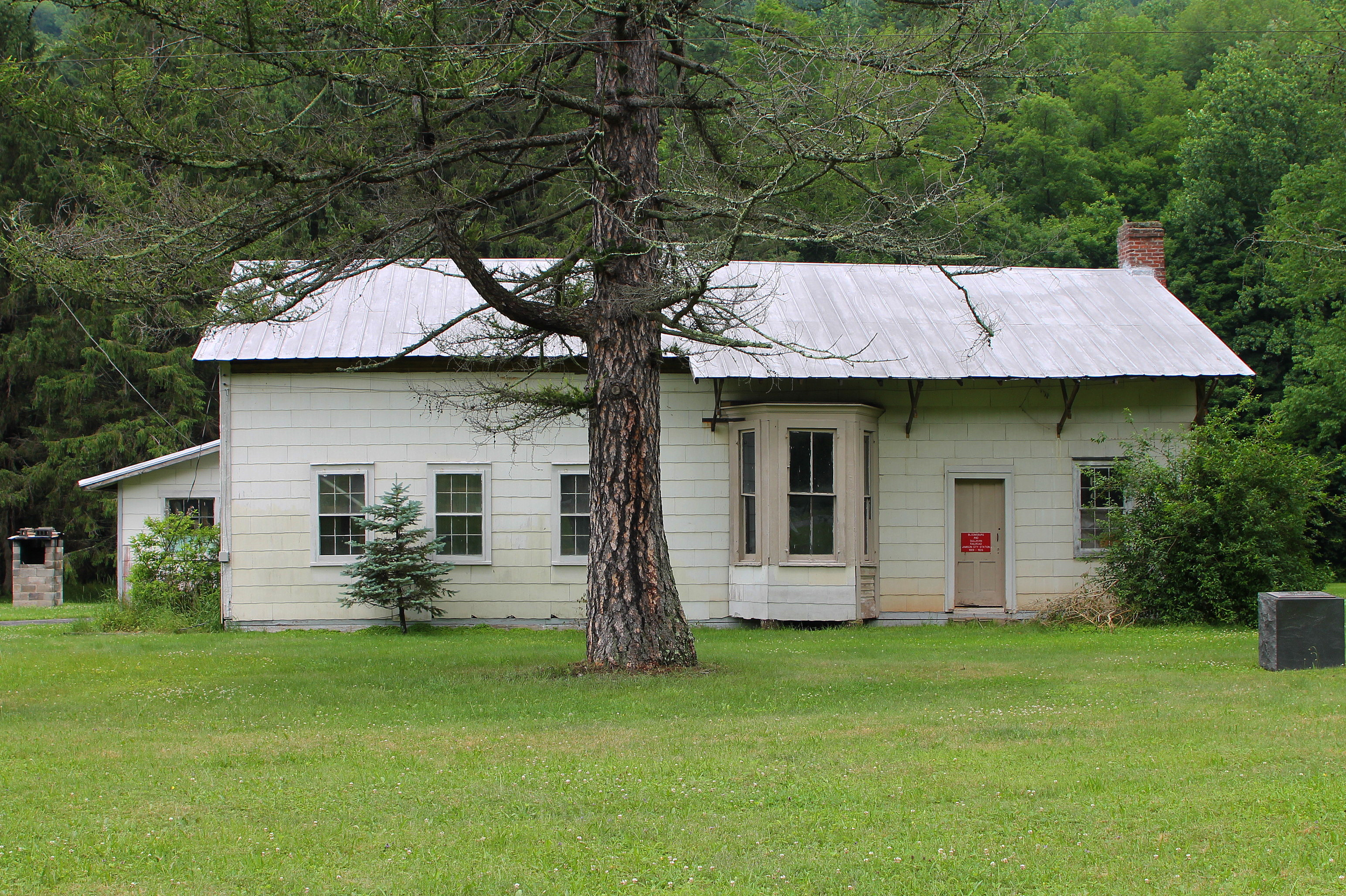
- Jamison City station on the Bloomsburg and Sullivan Railroad

Overview
- Headquarters: Williamsport, Pennsylvania
- Locale: Columbia County, Pennsylvania
- Dates of operation: 1883–1928
- Predecessor: None
- Successor: Reading Company (Bloomsburg Branch)

Technical
- Length: 29 miles (46.7 km)

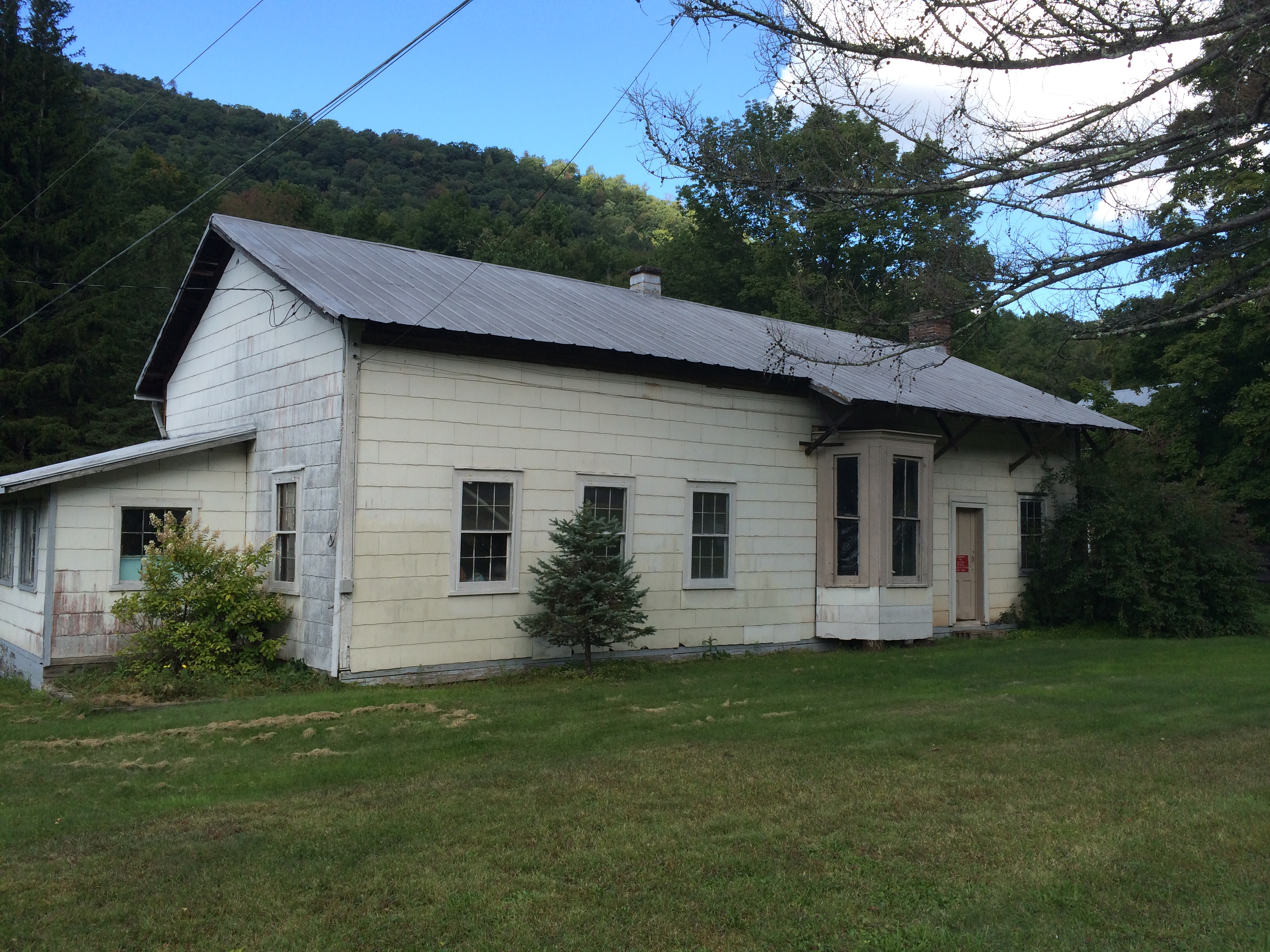
Jamison City station on the Bloomsburg and Sullivan Railroad. Building is one of the few remaining stations that is in the original location and is still standing. The station is still standing as of 2024. A monument in the front yard commemorating the 100th year Centennial of Jamison City in 1989 (dedicated to E. William (Bill) and Pauline Mather who owned the station grounds until 2012) and the Mather General Store building to the right of the train station that his father ran when Jamison City was in its heyday circa 1889.

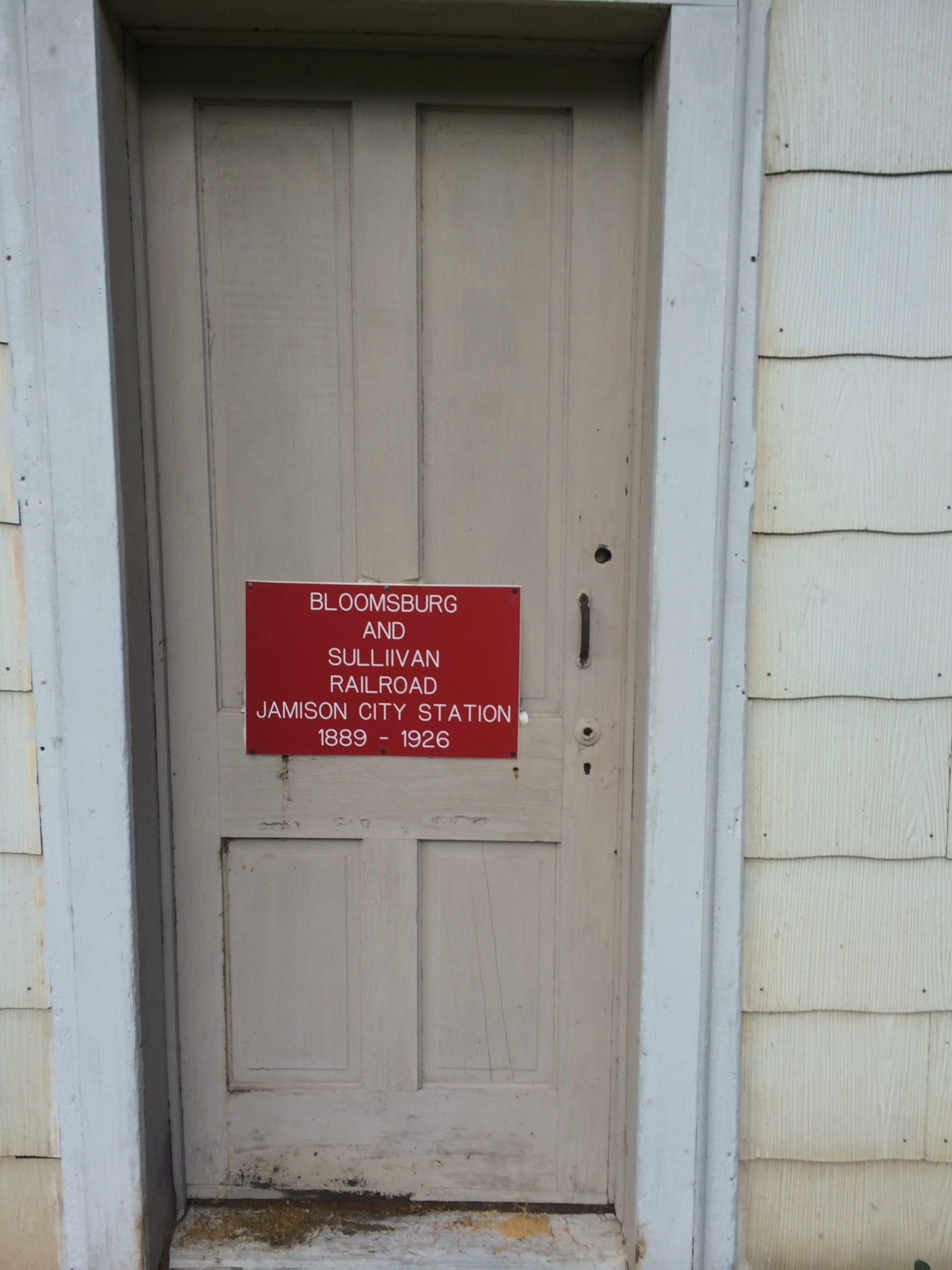
Historical Marker on the door of the Jamison City station on the Bloomsburg and Sullivan railroad. Historical marker was placed for the Jamison City Centennial celebration that occurred in July 1989.

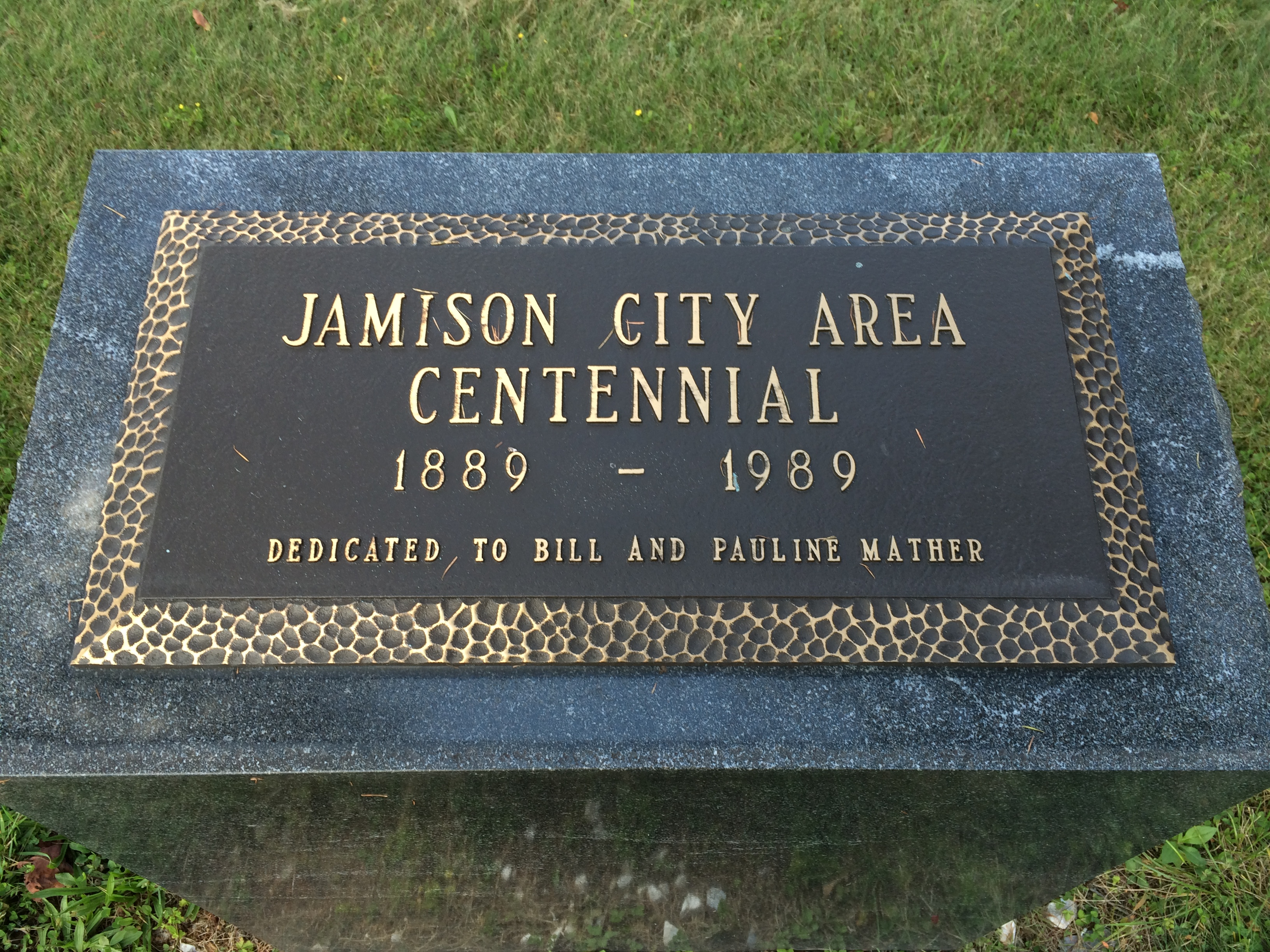
Jamison City Bloomsburg and Sullivan railroad station Centennial marker on the grounds of the Jamison City train station on the Bloomsburg and Sullivan railroad commemorating the Jamison City Area Centennial celebration that occurred in July 1989. Marker was dedicated to Bill and Pauline Mather who owned the land of the train station until 2012.

The Bloomsburg and Sullivan Railroad, (e.1883-d.1972) also called the B & S Railroad, was a long-lived independent shortline railroad that existed under that name operating independently from 1883 to 1928 (Note: As stated in the article, the railroad existed under a different name from 1928 to 1972) in Columbia County, Pennsylvania, when it was made a subsidiary of the Reading Company, which closed it in 1972. The shortline railroad was 29 miles long, running from south of Bloomsburg, Pennsylvania past the town, then northwards to Jamison City, Pennsylvania, with 4.45 miles of yard tracks. The Bloomsburg and Sullivan Railroad was one of five railroads serving Bloomsburg near the turn of the 20th century. The Bloomsburg and Sullivan Railroad Company's headquarters was in Williamsport, Pennsylvania, and the managers of the company were James Corcoran and Thomas Wheeler. The Bloomsburg and Sullivan Railroad owned five locomotives and seven cars in 1917.

== History ==
In the 1870s and early 1880s, a Bloomsburg newspaper, The Columbian, ran a series of articles promoting a railroad from Bloomsburg to Sullivan County. These articles told of timber, "soft coal", and "iron ore" in the area, and stated that communities along the railroad's route would profit greatly from the railroad. However, the idea to build the Bloomsburg and Sullivan Railroad was first conceived by David Jewett Waller. In August 1883, a meeting was hosted in Benton to discuss the railroad, and the charter for the Bloomsburg and Sullivan Railroad was granted in November 1883. The right-of-way for the railroad was secured by H.J. Connor and Silas McHenry.

Charles R. Buckalew was made president of the Bloomsburg and Sullivan Railroad starting in 1886. In 1886, tracks were laid near Orangeville, and in 1887, tracks were laid near Bloomsburg. In May 1887, the Columbian started a column entitled "Bloomsburg and Sullivan Railroad Notes". The tracks reached Benton in 1887. The railroad was completed in 1888, and service began on November 30 of that year. The railroad was mostly built by fifty Italian workers overseen by John Bush. Approximately 0.75 miles of track were laid each day of construction. In 1889, there were plans to extend the railroad further north to Bernice, Pennsylvania and the Lehigh Valley Railroad, if coal fields were discovered in that area, but this plan was never carried out. However, a route in this area was surveyed.

The first freight on the Bloomsburg and Sullivan Railroad was shipped on June 21, 1887, from Bloomsburg to Lightstreet. The first passenger train on the railroad ran in September 1887. By November 1888, lumber was being regularly shipped via the Bloomsburg and Sullivan Railroad from Jamison City to the east coast of the United States. By 1915, six passenger trains and several freight trains were running on the railroad each day, although there was more traffic on the railroad in the years before that.

In 1904, the Bloomsburg and Sullivan Railroad was the only railroad that remained operational during the third flood of the Susquehanna Valley of that year.

In 1912, a sawmill in Jamison City went out of business, which was the event that started the decline of the Bloomsburg and Sullivan Railroad, and a tannery going out of business in Jamison City in 1925 furthered the railroad's decline. Eventually, railroad service north of Benton stopped, and in 1925, the tracks in Jamison City were removed, because Jamison City's lumber and tanning industries had faltered. The Bloomsburg and Sullivan railroad went bankrupt in 1928 and was auctioned to the Philadelphia and Reading Railroad the same year. Scheduled passenger trains along the railroad to Benton ceased in 1930. The last passenger train carrying a large number of passengers along the Bloomsburg and Sullivan Railroad to Benton was in 1934. Freight service to Benton along the Bloomsburg and Sullivan Railroad ceased in 1969, when a flash flood severely damaged much of the railroad, and the tracks from Lighstreet to Benton were removed. The railroad tracks in Bloomsburg were removed in 1971, following the re-pavement of 5th Street. However, service from Bloomsburg to Lightstreet continued until Hurricane Agnes in 1972.

== Financial information ==
The building of the Bloomsburg and Sullivan Railroad was primarily backed by bankers and attorneys from Philadelphia. It was financed by Benton K. Jamison. A total $500,000 were donated to the building of the railroad. In 1917, there existed $600,000 of stock of Bloomsburg and Sullivan Railroad company. In 1910, the railroad's net profit was $40,004, but this value had fallen to $31,936 by 1915. Although the railroad never did make a very large amount of money, it was critical to the development of the Fishing Creek valley. From 1888 to 1892, the community of Jamison City relied almost entirely on the Bloomsburg and Sullivan Railroad.

When the Bloomsburg and Sullivan Railroad was first constructed, it had a monopoly on travel to the upper Fishing Creek valley. However, this changed in 1892, when a road to Benton was constructed. Despite this, in 1915, the railroad employed 150 people and ran six passenger trains per day, as well as freight trains, but due to the closing of the sawmill, these values were lower than in previous years. One of the contributing factors to the decline of the Bloomsburg and Sullivan Railroad was the advent of trucks in the mid-20th century.

== Route ==
The Bloomsburg and Sullivan Railroad's southern terminus was in Catawissa at the junction of the Pennsylvania Railroad and the Reading Company. From there, the railroad ran up the west bank of the Susquehanna River to the mouth of Fishing Creek, and up along Fishing Creek to the community of Rupert. Here, the railroad crosses Fishing Creek and goes through the location of the Bloomsburg Fairgrounds to Railroad Street, which it parallels north to the east bank of Fishing Creek. From there, the railroad paralleled Fishing Creek to the northern reaches of Bloomsburg, at which point it turned northeast to Lighstreet, then north to Orangeville. North of Orangeville, the railroad ran on a bridge over Fishing Creek, near the point that Pennsylvania Route 487 also crosses Fishing Creek. It then headed to the community of Zaners, where it ran alongside what is now protected land for 2,500 feet (760 m). From there, the railroad traveled roughly north through Stillwater and Benton, to its northern terminus at Jamison City, on the West Branch Fishing Creek. At the community of Central, a short branch line went in a northwesterly direction away from the main line. A 1947 map shows several other minor branch lines in the northern section of the railroad.

== Stations and intersections ==
The Bloomsburg and Sullivan Railroad had stations at Bloomsburg, Lightstreet, Orangeville, Forks, Stillwater, and Jamison City, Pennsylvania. The Bloomsburg and Sullivan Railroad intersected the Pennsylvania Railroad and the Reading Railroad at its southern terminus. The Bloomsburg and Sullivan Railroad also intersected the Susquehanna, Bloomsburg, and Berwick Railroad in northern Scott Township, and the Lackawanna and Reading Railroad in Bloomsburg.

The Bloomsburg and Sullivan Railroad's station for passengers in Benton was on Market Street, and the station for freight was located slightly north of the passenger station. The railroad's station in Benton was known as the Benton Station. Despite the fact that the railroad tracks to Jamison City were removed in the 1920s, the former railroad station at Jamison City still exists as of 2021. Another train station on the Bloomsburg and Sullivan Railroad was known as the Laubach Station.

== Uses ==
Most of what trains on the Bloomsburg and Sullivan Railroad carried were wood and farm products. However, the Bloomsburg and Sullivan Railroad also provided passenger trains, and freight trains carrying lumber and leather from Jamison City and rock lime also traveled on the railroad. The railroad also provided access to the Bloomsburg Fair. Other uses included carrying animal hides to Jamison City, where there was a tannery; paper from two paper mills along the railroad; and mining materials from the community of Forks.

== See also ==
- List of Pennsylvania railroads
- Reading Company
