= David Jewett Waller Jr. =

- Born: July 17, 1846; Bloomsburg, Pennsylvania
- Died: June 28, 1941
- Known for: Contributing to the field of education in Pennsylvania
- Relatives: David Jewett Waller Sr. (father)

David Jewett Waller Jr. (July 17, 1846 – June 28, 1941) was a Pennsylvanian minister and educator. He attended Lafayette College and Ursinus College. Waller was principal of the Bloomsburg State Normal School from 1877 to 1890 and 1906 to 1920, superintendent of public instruction from 1890 to 1893, and principal of a school in Indiana from 1893 to 1903. Waller was ordained in 1874.

== Early life and education ==
Waller was born on July 17, 1846. His parents were David Jewett Waller Sr. and Julia Ellmaker Waller. He was their fifth child. When young he was educated at Bloomsburg. After that he went to a classical school in a local Primitive Methodist Episcopal Church. When Waller was fourteen he was sent to a school run by Revered Gayley in the community of Media. In 1861, at the age of 15, he went to Williams College's preparatory department. However, due to sickness his education ceased for three years. In 1867, he was among the first people to graduate from the Bloomsburg Literary Institute. Waller went to Lafayette College in the autumn of 1867. He did well there and graduated from there with a Bachelor of Arts degree in 1870 and a Master of Arts degree in 1873. From 1870 to 1871 he trained to be and served as a tutor in Latin and Greek. While at Lafayette College he also won the Fowler Prize, a prize of $30 granted for excellence in English philology. Waller attended the Princeton Theological Seminary from 1871 to 1872, then switched to the Union Theological Seminary and graduated from that in 1874. He received an honorary Ph.D from Lafayette College in 1880 and received a Doctor of Divinity degree from Ursinus College in 1892. Juniata College granted Waller an honorary Doctor of Laws degree in 1934.

== Service to churches ==
The Presbytery of Northumberland gave Waller permission to preach in 1873. He was ordained on November 30, 1874, by the Central presbytery of Philadelphia. From 1874 to 1876 Waller served as a pastor in Philadelphia and from 1876 to 1877 he moved to Bloomsburg and served in this role in Orangeville, Rohrsburg, and Raven Creek, an area with approximately a twelve-mile radius. Waller served with the Presbytery of Northumberland from 1876 to 1890. While teaching at the Bloomsburg Normal School he sometimes occupied pulpits as a supply pastor. Waller returned to preaching after leaving the office of Superintendent of Public Instruction in 1893.

== Work as an educator ==
Waller served as a tutor at Lafayette College from 1870 to 1871, and trustee from 1892 to 1898. He was principal of Bloomsburg's State Normal School from 1877 to 1890. Waller was elected to this position on July 17, 1877. The school's board voted 11 in favor and 7 against Waller's promotion. His salary started out at $1220 per year but decreased to $1120 after one year, although in 1883 it increased to $1300 per year, then $1500, then $2000. Waller also taught mental and moral science at the school. During his time teaching at the Bloomsburg Normal School he also lectured at the Columbia County Institute on occasion. He made three appearances at the Columbia County Teachers' Institute, which was held in December 1878. From 1890 to 1893, he was superintendent of public instruction for Pennsylvania, following the death of the previous holder of this office. However, he continued to give addressees at County Institutes. He was chosen for the position over the two deputies of the previous superintendent. He was principal of a normal school in Indiana, Pennsylvania from 1893 to 1903. He applied for the position in the beginning of spring 1893 and officially received the position on June 30, 1893. Waller's salary here was $2000. He started attending board meetings at the school in the spring of 1895. Additionally, Waller and the school board examined the possibility of introducing athletics to the school. He returned to Bloomsburg for a time in October 1895 after the death of his eldest son, David Jewett Waller III. In 1901 he and the school board moved the Indiana Normal School over to a half-day schedule for most days of the week. He attended the Convention of Pennsylvania State Teachers at the Bloomsburg Normal School in July 1896. During the convention he was elected president of it. He made speeches to the convention in 1897 and to the State Teacher's Association in 1899. In the middle of October 1906, Waller was invited to return to serve as the principal of the Bloomsburg State Normal School, and he accepted this position. This time his salary was higher than the previous time he served at the Bloomsburg State Normal School, about $4500 in the 1908 to 1909 school year. He opened a new science hall for the school in 1907. In 1911, Waller tentatively approved football for the normal school. As time went on he became more supportive of athletics. He also developed the school's curriculum, adding such ourses as domestic science and agriculture and library economics. Additionally, Waller increased the amount of education provided to four years. In late April and early May 1912 he made several lectures at Lafayette College. During Waller's term as principal of the normal school he also wrote an article on normal schools for the Journal. He retired from the position in 1920, at the age of 74.

While in the office of Superintendent of Public Instruction, Waller advocated the introduction of free textbooks, higher salaries for teachers, and endorsed professorships in normal schools. He also worked towards compulsory education. He presided at Philadelphia's Convention of Superintendents of Schools in February 1891. Waller was among the principal people to speak at the spring 1892 convention of City and Borough Superintendences in Williamsport. His plans for reform included introducing cooperation between school personnel. Waller spent most of 1892 trying to gather support for his ideas on education in the previous years. He left the office in April 1893.

Waller advocated lengthening the school term. He was once offered a position as the president of the Pennsylvania State College and he accepted, although the Bloomsburg school board wished him to remain in Bloomsburg. He went to the convention of the National Education Association in Kansas City in 1917. On the Christmas of 1921 Waller made a speech at the Harrisburg's Pennsylvania State Education Association.

== Other work ==
In 1884 Waller improved the State Normal School's sewage system and laid 4,000 feet (1,200 meters) of flagstone and renovated several buildings on the State Normal School's campus. Another one of his projects with the normal school was to establish a physical plant. At a normal school in Indiana he was involved in creating a more efficient ventilating system. At one point Waller was a director of the North and West Branch Railway.

== Personal life ==
Waller married the Bloomsburg resident Anna Appleman on May 14, 1874. The couple had seven children. Six of them were David J. (born 1876), Mabel (born 1878), Lizzie (born 1880), Margaret (born 1882), Robert (born 1884), and Harriet (born 1886). Waller and his family went to the Chicago World's Fair once after 1893. In 1903, Waller took his family to Windermere during the summer. He continued did this again in 1904 and possibly 1905 before buying an estate near Windermere as a summer home. Waller had good health and swam on a daily basis into his nineties. He was a supporter of temperance.

== Later life, death, and legacy ==
Despite retiring in 1920, Waller spoke the invocation at the beginning of each school year from 1921 to 1938. He remained active in the community after retiring. He was officially granted the title of President Emeritus in 1930 although the press referred to him by this title as early as 1920. His last appearance at an event of statewide significance was in 1934, at the celebration of the 100th anniversary of the Free School Act.

A bronze tablet inscribed with Waller's contributions to education was created in 1922 by Tiffany Studios. In 1927, the Bloomsburg State Normal School named an extension to the school's main dormitory after Waller. The gymnasium at the Indiana State Normal School was named the Waller Building in 1948 in honor of Waller. In 1973, the Bloomsburg State Normal School (then called the Bloomsburg Teacher's College) named its Waller Administration Building after him and dedicated the building to him.

Waller died on June 28, 1941, at the age of 94.
