= Nathan Waller (soldier) =

American Revolutionary War soldier

- Born: March 7, 1753; Cornwall, Connecticut
- Died: July 11, 1831 (aged 78); Wilkes-Barre, Pennsylvania
- Occupations: soldier, farmer, landowner
- Spouse: Elizabeth Weeks
- Children: Phineas Waller, Eliud Waller

Nathan Waller (March 7, 1753 – July 11, 1831) was an American Revolutionary War soldier. He was originally from Connecticut, but became an early settler in the Wyoming Valley region of present-day Pennsylvania. He fought in the American Revolutionary War, reaching the rank of captain. Later, he became a relatively prosperous farmer and landowner.

== Early life ==
Waller was born to Phineas and Rhoda Waller in Cornwall, Connecticut, on March 7, 1753. He was the eldest of five sons. At an early age, he moved to the Wyoming Valley, in Pennsylvania, becoming one of the early settlers there. Like many others, he had purchased land from the Susquehanna Company in the area.

== Career ==
=== Military service ===
While in Connecticut with his family in 1775, Waller joined the Revolutionary army as a private within Captain Hickock's Company, which was part of Colonel Beardsley's Sixteenth Regiment, which was in turn part of the Connecticut Line. In 1779, he participated in the expedition to Farfield and Darbury, Connecticut. He was also wounded in a military engagement at Horse Neck, close to West Greenwich, in the same year.

Waller eventually attained the rank of captain. Once the war ended, Waller returned with his family to the Wyoming Valley.

=== Later career ===
After returning to the Wyoming Valley, Waller came to own significant amounts of land in and around Wilkes-Barre. Prior to 1787, he constructed a house on his lower farm. More than a hundred years later, in the early 20th century, it was still standing on what was then Division Street. In the early 19th century, he sold his farm in South Wilkes-Barre and bought the Putman Catlin farm, a large farm on the Susquehanna River in Oquago, New York (now part of Windsor, in Broome County).

When the state of Pennsylvania was awarded sovereignty of the Wyoming Valley region in December 1782, Waller did not oppose this action. On April 21, 1787, he signed a document supporting the laws of Pennsylvania and in that year, he took an oath of loyalty to that state. In 1795, he was on a jury that conditionally convicted several anti-Pennsylvania conspirators.

Waller's name appears quite frequently in the earliest records of Luzerne County. In 1792, he, Zebulon Butler, and Timothy Pickering were on a committee appointed by Wilkes-Barre to determine a location for a new Congregational Church. The site they chose was on Wilkes-Barre's public square. He eventually went on to become a relatively prosperous landowner and was also a farmer.

== Personal life and death ==
Waller married Elizabeth Weeks on May 4, 1773. They had two sons, Phineas and Eliud (died 1814), and eight daughters: Lydia, Lucy, Elizabeth, and five others who moved to western New York. After marrying, he moved to a farm in the Wyoming Valley. In 1775, Waller returned to Connecticut with his wife and his infant son Phineas. Early in the 19th century, he moved to his farm in Oquago, taking part of his family with him. In 1822, he swapped farms with his son Phineas and returned to Wilkes-Barre, where he lived until his death. His paternal grandson was David Jewett Waller, Sr., a Pennsylvanian minister and civic leader.

Waller was described as "a man of powerful physique". According to legend, he once killed a bear in Plains when armed with only a pine knot. Waller died on July 11, 1831, in Wilkes-Barre, Pennsylvania, at the age of 78.
