= Susquehanna, Bloomsburg, and Berwick Railroad =

Overview
- Dates of operation: 1902–1918
- Predecessor: Wilkes-Barre and Western Railroad
- Successor: Pennsylvania Railroad

Technical
- Length: 39.22 miles

The Susquehanna, Bloomsburg, and Berwick Railroad, also known as the SB&B Railroad or the Weak and Weary Railroad, which referred to the fact that it was not a financial success, was a railroad in northeastern Pennsylvania until 1918. The route ran from Watsontown, Pennsylvania to Berwick, Pennsylvania. The railroad was 39.22 miles long, with 3.51 miles of branches, totaling 42.83 miles. The railroad was also known as the "Sweet By and By". Trains typically ran along the railroad six days a week. What remains of it is currently a subsidiary of the Pennsylvania Railroad Company.

== Predecessors ==
The Susquehanna, Bloomsburg and Berwick began as the Wilkes-Barre and Western Railway, incorporated on June 22, 1886 to build from Watsontown to Shickshinny. It opened 22 miles (35 km) of line from Watsontown to Millville in 1887, and in 1891, opened an additional 9 miles (14 km) from Millville Junction, just south of Millville, to Orangeville.

The promoters of the Wilkes-Barre and Western envisioned it as part of a trunk line which would move bituminous coal east from the Clearfield Coalfield and anthracite west from Wilkes-Barre. Two affiliated railroads were chartered to help build these connections: the Turbotville and Williamsport Railroad was incorporated on November 18, 1892 to build from Turbotville to Williamsport, while the Orangeville and Lehigh Railroad was incorporated on December 12, 1892 to build 70 miles (110 km) north from Orangeville to Hauser's Mills, now Pocono Lake, on the line of the Wilkes-Barre and Eastern Railroad. Neither of these two roads were constructed and they were consolidated with the Wilkes-Barre and Western on March 1, 1893 to form the Central Pennsylvania and Western Railroad. This railroad was reorganized on July 31, 1902 as the Susquehanna, Bloomsburrg and Berwick Railroad.

== History ==
The Susquehanna, Bloomsburg, and Berwick Railroad was originally called the Wilkes-Barre and Western Railroad, but renamed when its ownership was passed to a different company. Under this name, it was formed in 1885 and carried the first trains in 1887. The railroad was mostly constructed using manual labor. The laborers consisted of locals, Italian workers, and Hungarian workers. By 1891, the road extended as far east as Orangeville, but this course was abandoned in favor of routing the railroad to Berwick via Lightstreet. The Susquehanna, Bloomsburg, and Berwick Railroad originally only ran from Watsontown to Lightstreet, Pennsylvania. However, in 1903 the railroad was extended from Berwick to Eyers Grove. In that year, the railroad company discontinued its branch line from Eyers Grove to Orangeville due to a lack of business. However, it retained its branch line from Eyers Grove to Millville. By 1911, the Pennsylvania Railroad owned nearly all of the Susquehanna, Bloomsburg, and Berwick Railroad Company's stock. The Susquehanna, Bloomsburg, and Berwick railroad was absorbed by the Pennsylvania Railroad in 1918. It carried passengers for some years longer, although by 1940, passenger trains stopped running along the Susquehanna, Bloomsburg, and Berwick Railroad. However, the rail line continued to be used for other purposes until the late 1960s, when the American Car and Foundry plant in Berwick closed. After the closing of the plant, the railroad's use was negligible and the tracks entered a state of disrepair. By the beginning of the 1980s, the tracks east of Washingtonville had been removed. However, as of 2009, the railroad tracks from Washingtonville to Watsontown are still used.

There were once plans to extend the railroad as far east as Shickshinny, but these plans were never put into practice. Additionally, there were plans to extend the railroad west from Watsontown to merge with railroads carrying coal from Clearfield County.

== Stations and Intersections ==
The Susquehanna, Bloomsburg, and Berwick Railroad intersected the Bloomsburg and Sullivan Railroad near Lightstreet. The Susquehanna, Bloomsburg, and Berwick Railroad intersected another railroad in Eyers Grove. The railroad had stations in Watsontown, McEwensville, Warrior Run, Turbotville, Schuyler, Ottawa, Washingtonville, Derry, Jerseytown, Eyers Grove, Millville, Buckhorn, Paper Mill, Lightstreet, Bloomsburg, Cabin Run, Fowlersville, Dennis Mills, and Berwick.

== Financial information ==
In 1908, the total assets of the Susquehanna, Bloomsburg, and Berwick Railroad company were $1,826,856.48. The Susquehanna, Bloomsburg, and Berwick Railroad, then known as the Wilkes-Barre and Western Railroad was sold in 1902. Some months later in 1902 the railroad was sold again, and this time renamed the Susquehanna, Bloomsburg, and Berwick railroad.

In 1905, the total cost of the Susquehanna, Bloomsburg and Berwick Railroad was $1,672,118.13. Between 1910 and 1916, the net income of the railroad ranged from $7342 in 1915 to $159,159 in 1916. Their gross revenue between 1910 and 1916 ranged from $108,687 in 1915 to $320,072 in 1916. The company's capital stock consisted of $1,000,000 in the form of $50 shares.

== Course ==
The Susquehanna, Bloomsburg, and Berwick Railroad started in Watsontown, and, passing through Jerseytown, Mordansville. From Mordansville, the railroad went down the Little Fishing Creek river valley, then turned east to cross Fishing Creek. The route also passed through Lightstreet and Briar Creek before terminating in Berwick. The Susquehanna, Bloomsburg, and Berwick Railroad had two branch lines. One of them went from Eyers Grove to Millville and the other went from Eyers Grove to Orangeville.

== Uses ==
When the Susquehanna, Bloomsburg, and Berwick Railroad was first built in 1887, it was intended to be used for the anthracite fields on the North Branch and West Branch Susquehanna River. Starting in 1902, the Susquehanna, Bloomsburg, and Berwick Railroad carried most of the cars manufactured by Berwick's American Car and Foundry Company to their owners. Despite usually running only six days a week, trains would sometimes go along the railroad on Sundays to the Bloomsburg fairgrounds and picnic grounds at Eyers Grove. These runnings of trains were termed "Special Sunday excursions". In the 21st century, the remaining part of the railroad is used to provide service to the PPL Corporation plant.

== See also ==
- Bloomsburg and Sullivan Railroad
- List of Pennsylvania railroads

== Bibliography ==
- Taber, Thomas T., III (1987). Railroads of Pennsylvania Encyclopedia and Atlas. Thomas T. Taber III. ISBN 0-9603398-5-X.
