= Bloomsburg Children's Museum =

- Play • Learn • Discover
- Former name: The Children's Museum
- Established: 1985
- Location: 2 West 7th Street; Bloomsburg, Pennsylvania 17815 United States
- Coordinates: 40.998078°N 76.452454°W
- Type: Children's museum
- Visitors: 40,000 (2023)
- Founder: Elizabeth Strauss
- Assistant Director: Shelby Kellner
- Director: Ginny Weibel
- Chairperson: Taryn Crayton
- Website: the-childrens-museum.org

The Bloomsburg Children's Museum, formerly The Children's Museum, is a children's museum in Bloomsburg, Columbia County, Pennsylvania. It opened in May, 1985 with a traveling exhibit to local schools on optical illusions and puzzles and later expanded into a summer program. The museum finally moved into their permanent location in 2002 when a former fire station became available. The museum contains a variety of exhibits including local flora and fauna, Native American culture, balanced scales, and ancient Egypt.
