= David Jewett Waller Sr. =

Pennsylvanian minister and civic leader

David Jewett Waller
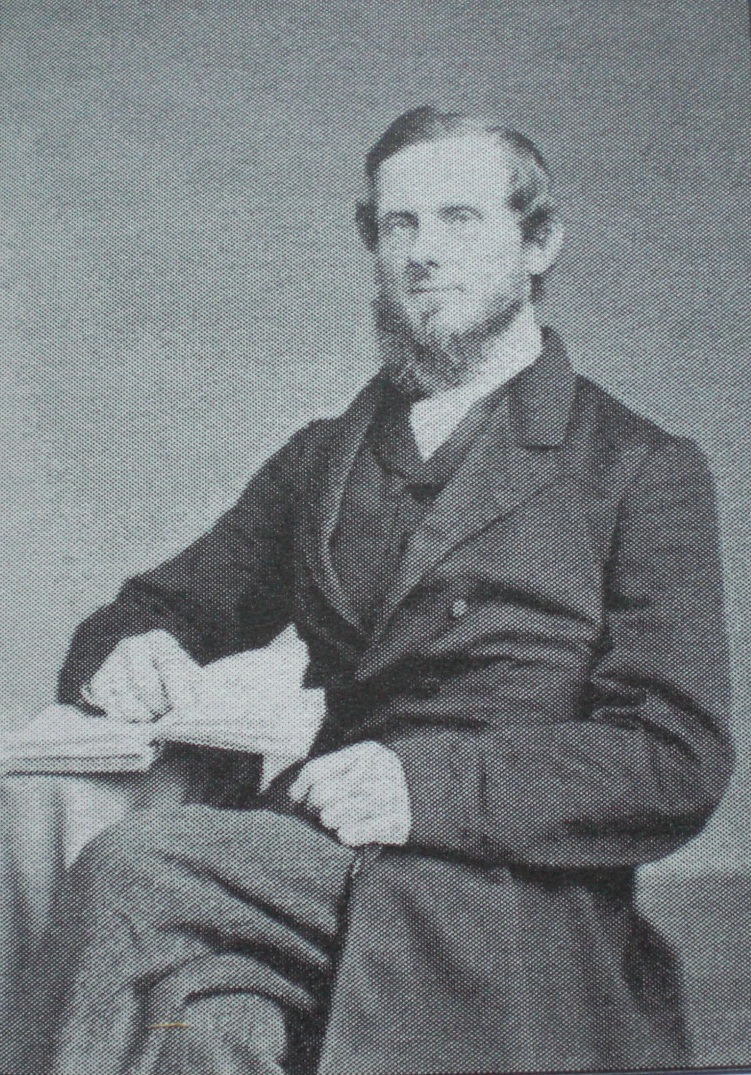
- David Jewett Waller
- Born: January 26, 1815; Wilkes-Barre, Pennsylvania, U.S.
- Died: December 7, 1893 (aged 78); Bloomsburg, Pennsylvania, U.S.
- Occupations: Minister, businessman
- Relatives: David Jewett Waller Jr. (son), Phineas Waller (father)

David Jewett Waller Sr. (January 26, 1815 – December 7, 1893) was an American Presbyterian minister, entrepreneur, landowner and civic leader who lived in the American state of Pennsylvania. He also helped build several local railroads, such as the North and West Branch Railway and also owned many coal mines. By the time of his death, he was one of the most well-known people in northeastern Pennsylvania. He helped increasing the population and industrialization of Bloomsburg, Pennsylvania. He also organized and created a number of churches in Pennsylvania.

Waller was born in Wilkes-Barre, Pennsylvania and attended the Wilkes-Barre Academy, Williams College, and the Princeton Theological Seminary. He spent most of his life in Bloomsburg, Pennsylvania, where he died. He was ordained in 1839 and attended General Assemblies of the Presbyterian Church in addition to preaching in Columbia County. He retired from preaching in 1871 and most of his involvement in industrial and commercial work started at this point, including involvement in the railroad and the coal industries. He died in 1893 at the age of 78.

== Early life and education ==
Waller was born on January 26, 1815, in Wilkes-Barre, Pennsylvania, the oldest of five children. He was born to Phineas Waller and Elizabeth Jewett and was descended from early settlers of Massachusetts and Connecticut. His ancestors moved to Pennsylvania two generations before his birth. When he was eight years old, his father moved to Oquago, New York, while he and his half-brother Nathan remained in Pennsylvania. He then went to live with his aunts Rachel and Sally, enabling him to attend the Wilkes-Barre Academy and avoid his mother, who was an alcoholic. Waller attended the Wilkes-Barre Academy and received good grades, despite what historian William M. Ballie called a "prickly" personality. However, he received good grades in school.

Waller taught Sunday school while in his early teens. When he was 15, he attended Williams College, from which he graduated in 1834. At Williams College, he came near to being expelled after arguing with a teacher. After Williams College, he considered being a lawyer, businessman or government worker. His brother William advised against his becoming a government worker or businessman, so he decided to become a minister. He attended the Princeton Theological Seminary starting in October 1834 and continuing for three years. Here he also came near to being expelled after a dispute with the teacher John Breckenridge. He graduated from the Princeton Theological Seminary in 1837 with a Bachelor of Divinity degree. Waller moved to Bloomsburg, Pennsylvania in 1838.

== Service to the church ==
In 1838, the Presbyterian Church in Milton, Pennsylvania requested Waller's service, but he instead began preaching in Bloomsburg, Pennsylvania. He also preached in Wilkes-Barre and Lancaster in late 1838 and in Danville and Milton in early 1839. On May 1, 1839, he was ordained in Bloomsburg, Pennsylvania. His Presbyterian ministry began on a church on Third Street in Bloomsburg. When he began preaching, his ministry covered all of Columbia County, as well as an area from Danville to the Wyoming Valley. In 1840, he stopped preaching at Briar Creek and Berwick, as they became part of a separate ministry. In 1842, he began preaching in Orangeville and New Columbia. he preached in Espy since at least 1857. Due to the size of his ministry, he was never able to preach at a given church more than once every two weeks and only preached at most churches once a month. He typically traveled approximately 5000 miles per year to preach or conduct funerals. Initially his salary was $600.

Waller was a counsel in ecclesiastical trials. He went to the General Assemblies in 1844, 1853, 1861, 1865 to 1867, 1876, 1886, and 1890. He was interested in foreign missions and devoted one service per month to news from foreign missions and was elected to a four-year term on the Board of Foreign Missions in 1865. He was elected to be the Moderator of Presbytery in 1842, 1851, and 1881. At that time he was the only person to be elected to that position more than once.

In addition to preaching at churches, Waller also revived, organized, or founded a number of them. In 1839, he revived the Hidlay Church, near Briar Creek, and a church at Berwick. He and two other people officially organized the Presbyterian church in Orangeville in October 1843. He and three others also attempted unsuccessfully to organize a church it Catawissa. In 1856, he traveled to Schuylkill County and preached in churches there numerous times and in 1857, he and two other people organized a church in Ashland in Schuylkill County.

== Land purchase and sale ==
Waller owned 20 percent (900 acres) of the land in Bloomsburg at various times during his life, which is more than any other person has held in the town to date. He also owned land in other parts of Columbia County and the Wyoming Valley. his lands in Bloomsburg primarily included northeastern, southeastern, and south-central Bloomsburg, but also included some small areas of land near Bloomsburg's border with Hemlock Township. He sold some of his land, but also donated parts of it by selling those areas for $1.

Waller developed a number of community features on this land, including five churches, the Columbia County Courthouse and Jail, and several industries such as the Magee Carpet Company and the Bloomsburg Silk Mills. In 1870, he sold three acres of land on Seventh Street in Bloomsburg for the purpose of building a park, but the land was instead used for athletic competitions. In 1890, he sold two lots at the corner of Sixth Street and Iron Street to Paul E. Wirt, a fountain pen manufacturer. He also hired the town engineer Samuel Neyhard to develop Bloomsburg from Fifth Street to the Susquehanna River. Most of this work was done after Waller was no longer a minister.

In 1869, Waller purchased 330 acres of land along Fishing Creek from the Bloomsburg Iron Company and for $3000 and later sold it for $19,037. He sold some land in Mount Pleasant Township for a place to house poor people. He also made a number of a number of purchases of land near the end of his life, including 93 acres at the confluence of Fishing Creek and Raven Creek in 1890 and 22.5 acres along the Susquehanna River in Scott Township and Bloomsburg in May 1893.

In 1854, Waller and two other people were chosen to find a location for Bloomsburg's Rosemont Cemetery. They chose a hill immediately north of Bloomsburg, which was partly his land, so on August 1, 1855 he sold them 2 acres and 33.5 perches of land to the Rosemont Cemetery Company for $490. He was president of the company from 1856 to his death in 1893.

== Work in industries ==
Waller was also involved in matters related the local railroads. On October 3, 1877, he sold some of his land in Bloomsburg to the Delaware, Lackawanna and Western Railroad for the purpose of a new railroad station. He was also involved in the building of the North and West Branch Railway between 1880 and 1881. He started raising money for this railroad in 1872 and broke the ground for the railroad in March 1872. Waller put most of his money into the building of the North and West Branch Railway. The work on the railroad stopped during the Panic of 1873 but resumed in 1880. The North and West Branch Railway Company was sold in 1881 but he managed to regain much of the company. The company was leased to the Pennsylvania Railroad on November 23, 1881, but remained its own company for approximately 20 years. He was president of the North and West Branch Railway in the 1880s. In 1888, he sold a piece of land to the town of Bloomsburg for the purpose of building the Bloomsburg and Sullivan Railroad through it. It was he who initially conceived the idea of the Bloomsburg and Sullivan Railroad. Waller also successfully convinced the Lackawanna and Bloomsburg Railroad to move its Bloomsburg station to his land on Market Street.

Waller was involved in the process of mining anthracite and owned large tracts of coal-containing land. In 1837, he invested jointly in an area of coal-containing land in Plymouth Township (now Larksville) with his uncle, Oristus Collins. He and Collins divided the land into their own parcels in 1840. He and several of his siblings also bought a piece of coal-mining land from his father for $10,000 in 1857. Waller gradually bought the coal-containing lots of his siblings until he had close to 250 acres of land with coal in 1872. In 1878, he purchased 28 acres of coal-mining land in Plymouth Township from Joseph Jaquish's heirs. Altogether his coal-mining lands outputted 50,000 tons (45,454 tonnes) per year, although this was only a small portion of the total coal output of the Wyoming Valley. After retiring as a minister he also purchased 2000 acres of coal-mining land near Chattanooga.

== Other work ==
In 1834, Waller went to New York City to be a tutor, but left after three or four weeks. This was the last time in his life that he was paid as a teacher but he still opened and funded some schools. He opened a classical school in Bloomsburg, which was built in 1839, and he contributed $3500 to it. Shortly after arriving in Bloomsburg, he organized a singing school and also created a Bible class in 1839. The class continued until after his death. He helped to open Bloomsburg's State Normal School. He was appointed a trustee of Lafayette College in 1849 by the Synod of Philadelphia. He held that position until 1879. He was also on Lafayette College's Ways and Means committee and helped stop the college from closing in 1852. In 1856, Waller helped convert a classical school into the Bloomsburg Literary Institute and served as one of the nine initial trustees. He resigned from being a trustee in 1866 after a dispute about where to set up a new building for the institute. Despite resigning from the trustees, he helped conduct the opening ceremony of the institute's new building on April 3, 1867.

In 1876, Waller ran as a Republican candidate for US Congress. He lost the election by 8376 votes to Democratic lawyer Francis Dolan Collins. He did, however, win Columbia County in the election. He was also the proprietor of a furnace on Roaring Creek and built the Bloomsburg Sanitarium at the corner of Sixth Street and Market Street in Bloomsburg in 1870. Waller was vice president of the State Agricultural Society. He also extended Market Street in Bloomsburg and built many houses along it. Along with John Ramsay, he built First Street in Bloomsburg and sold the lots on it to Welsh immigrants some time before 1847. He also laid out other residential streets in Bloomsburg. He supported moving the county seat of Columbia County from Danville to Bloomsburg, (Note: At that time Montour County, which Danville is in, was part of Columbia County.) although he was unable to convince Danville's businessmen to move their industries to Bloomsburg. In 1866, he was made one of three trustees of Bloomsburg's Board of Trade.

== Personal life ==
On May 23, 1839, Waller married Philadelphian Julia Ellmaker. He first met Ellmaker while visiting friends in Philadelphia during his time at the Princeton Theological Seminary. The couple had nine children between 1840 and 1858, six of whom survived to adulthood, and five of whom were alive at the time of his death. He lived at the corner of 5th and Market Streets in Bloomsburg, although at one point he owned much of the land between 4th Street, the Susquehanna River, Railroad Street, and Ferry Road in Bloomsburg. In 1871, he suffered a driving accident and was temporarily injured. He was in another accident in 1875 and due to this, he needed to walk with crutches for the remainder of his life. Waller also suffered from rheumatism and neuralgia due to extensive traveling. He retired from being a minister on April 16, 1871. He died in on December 7, 1893, at the age of 79. The services for his death were held in his home. The historian J.H. Battle made note of Waller's hospitality. He was interested in geology and another Presbyterian minister gave him a large mineralogy-related collection in 1848.

== Legacy ==
On the day of Waller's funeral, businesses in Bloomsburg closed from 3 p.m. to 5 p.m., a unique honor in the town's history. He was buried in the Old Rosemont Cemetery. During his lifetime, Waller made 25 purchases and 130 sales of land. By 1887 the area that he owned between 4th and 9th Streets in Bloomsburg were home to more than 200 houses. The community of Waller, Pennsylvania is named after him. In his two-column obituary in Bloomsburg's newspaper, it was stated that "No other man has left or probably will leave a greater impression on this community that he [Waller] did". There is a stained glass window that features Waller on a church in Bloomsburg. Approximately 20 of his sermons still survive. He was also the creator of the Waller Trust, which existed until the 1970s.
