= Bloomsburg Fair =

Annual event in Pennsylvania, US

Coordinates: 40.99648°N 76.46358°W

- Location: Bloomsburg, Pennsylvania
- Country: United States

The Bloomsburg Fair has been held in Bloomsburg, Pennsylvania, since 1855 and continues to this day.

== History ==
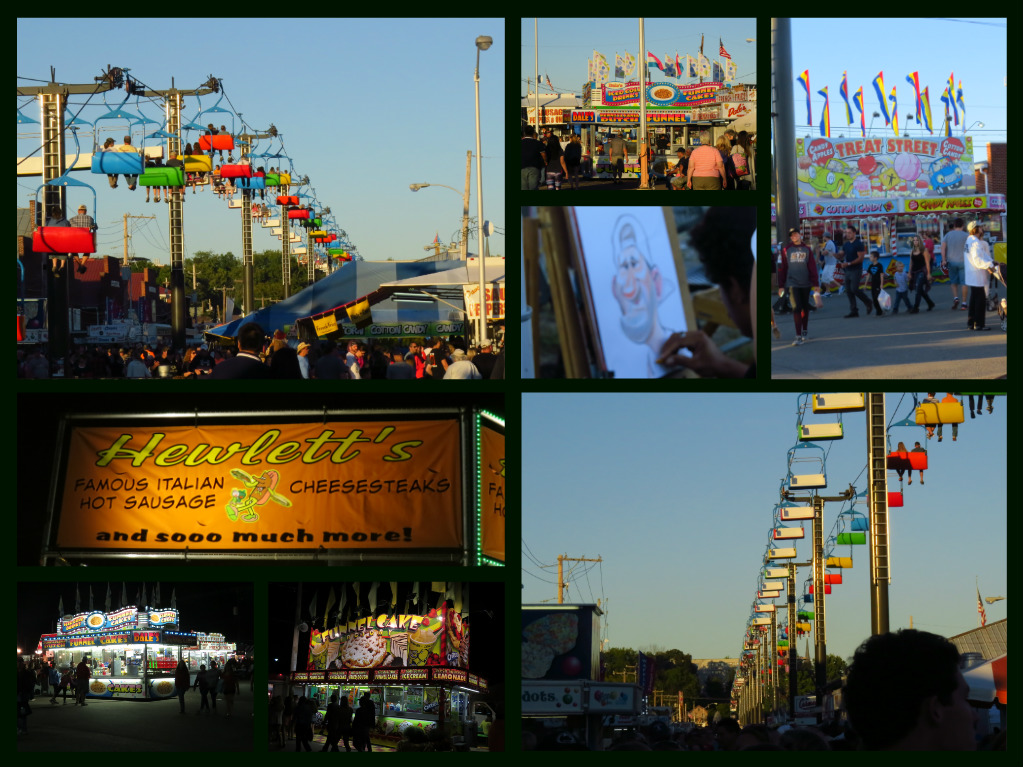
Scenes from Bloomsburg Fair 2016

It was originally held as an agricultural exhibition located on the lower end of Second Street, which is now Main Street. Since then it has grown to be the largest fair in the Commonwealth of Pennsylvania. The Bloomsburg Fair was started by Caleb Barton in 1854. The 156th Bloomsburg Fair was held from September 25 to October 2, 2010. In 2006, fair attendance for the week reached 413,203 people. The 157th Fair was scheduled to be held from September 24, 2011, to October 1, 2011, but was canceled due to flooding associated with Tropical Storm Lee. However, the fair returned with the 158th edition in 2012 after a one-year hiatus. On July 28, 2020, it was announced that the fair has been cancelled for 2020 due to the COVID-19 pandemic.

== Organization ==
The Bloomsburg Fair is run and maintained by a board of 13 directors, each in charge of a different aspect of the Fair. They are voted in by the thousands of members that hold a share in the Bloomsburg Fair during a yearly meeting. Each director has a different term length and can maintain their station as long as the shareholders allow. Any member can run for position on the board of directors as long as they have held that share for more than two years.

Current elected Director positions include: President, Secretary, Treasurer, Superintendent of Ticket Collectors, Superintendent of Police & Parking, Superintendent of the Grandstand, Superintendent of Concessions, Superintendent of Livestock, Superintendent of Horse Racing & Free Stage Entertainment, Superintendent of Agriculture, Superintendent of Horticulture, Superintendent of Arts & Crafts, and Superintendent of Rabbits, Poultry, & School Exhibits. The position of Vice President is appointed from within the Superintendent's, and is not an elected position.

While each director has a specific set of duties they all vote for major changes and additions that happen at the Fair Grounds.

== Unique aspects ==
The Bloomsburg Fair is one of the last quarter-mile dirt tracks to remain open during the winter season for harness racing. While the stage and seating is limited at the Bloomsburg Fair they still have high end entertainment. Fair week entertainment has been country music dominated but they allot two of the nights for a newer rock band and a classic rock band still in the past the fair has hosted acts such as Nelly, Three Days Grace, Sugarland, Seether, Lady Antebellum, Trace Adkins, 38 Special, Lynyrd Skynyrd, Foreigner, and comedians such as Jeff Dunham and Bill Engvall.

== Attractions ==
The fair has a variety of games, foods, shows, and contests. It has a midway with an assortment of carnival rides.

=== Contests ===
- Photography
- Canning
- Farm animals
- Baking

=== Entertainment ===
Every year, the Bloomsburg Fair's Grandstand hosts a variety of world-renowned musical artists, comedians, and general entertainment. The horse races and demolition derby are also a popular form of entertainment at the Bloomsburg Fair.

In 2006, international superstar Taylor Swift performed her first major concert at the fair.
