= Bloomsburg, Pennsylvania =

Town in Pennsylvania, United States

- Town
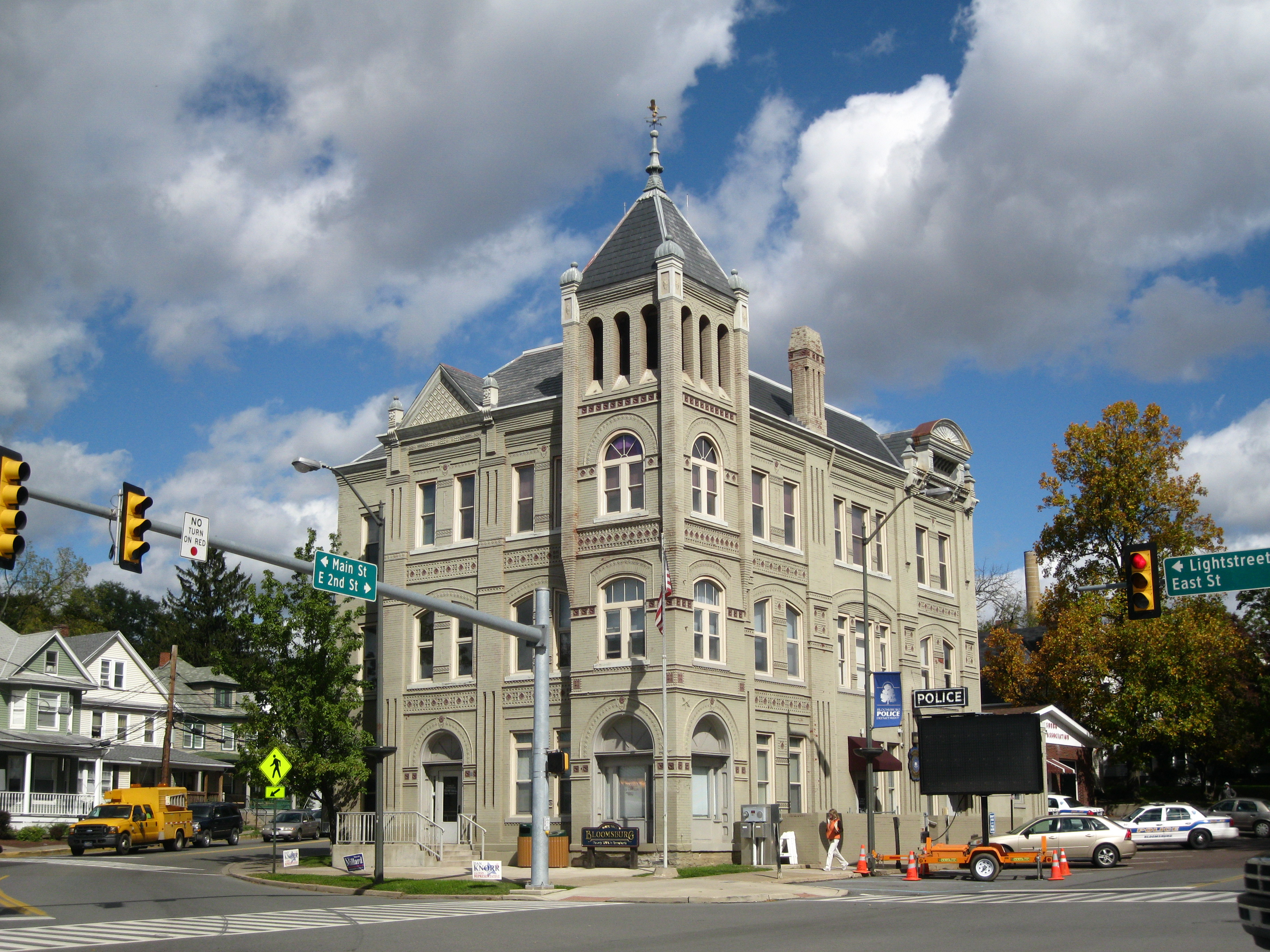
- Bloomsburg Town Hall in 2012

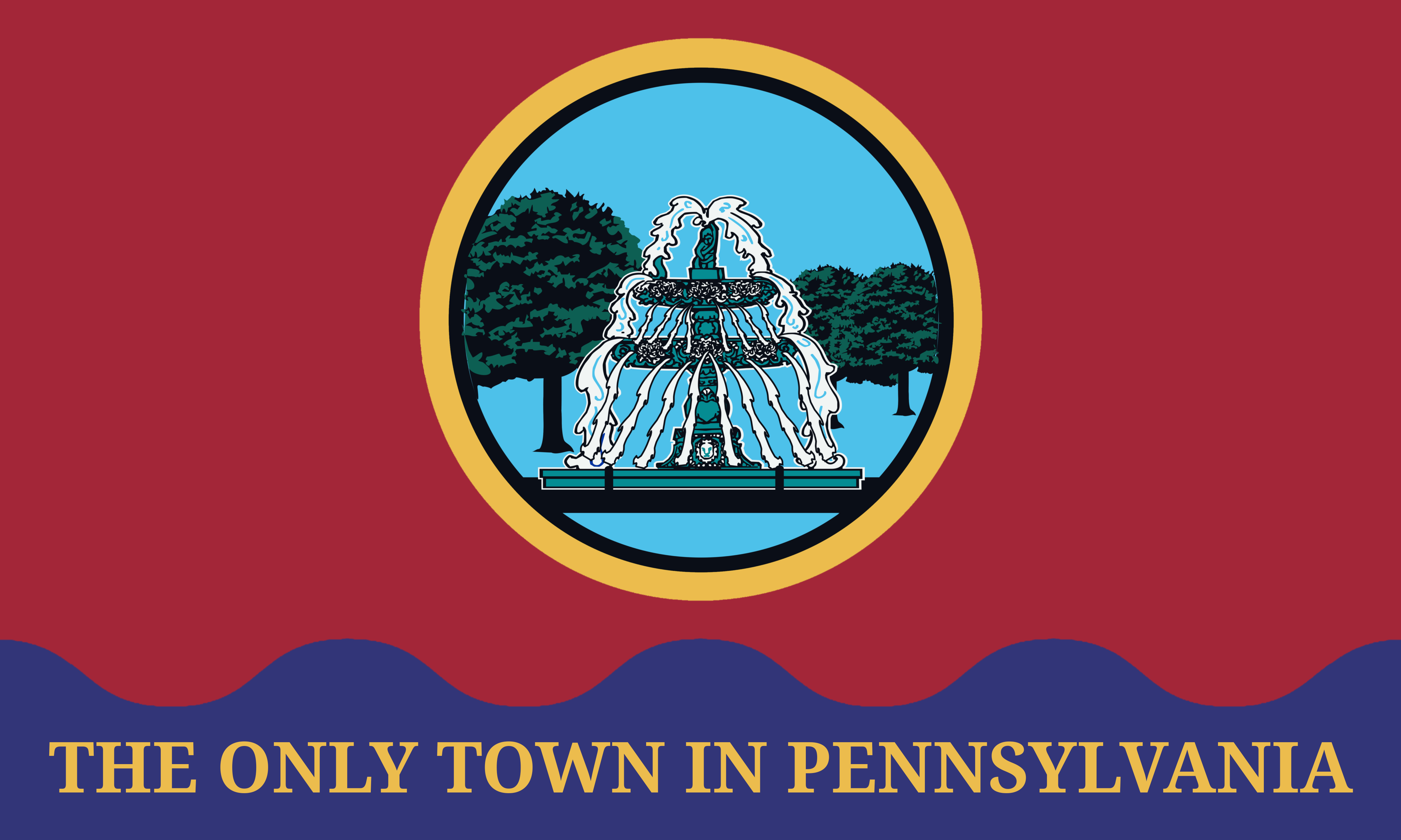
- Flag
- Nicknames: The only incorporated town in Pennsylvania, Bloom, Town of Love
- Location of Bloomsburg in Columbia County, Pennsylvania

- Location within Pennsylvania Location within the United States
- Coordinates: 41°00′09″N 76°27′29″W
- Country: United States
- State: Pennsylvania
- County: Columbia
- Bloom Township: 1797
- Town of Bloomsburg: March 4, 1870

Government
  - Mayor: Justin Hummel (D)

Area
  - Total: 4.69 sq mi (12.14 km^{2})
  - Land: 4.35 sq mi (11.26 km^{2})
  - Water: 0.34 sq mi (0.88 km^{2}) 7.22%
- Elevation: 531 ft (162 m)

Population (2020)
  - Total: 12,711
  - Density: 2,923.6/sq mi (1,128.81/km^{2})
- Time zone: UTC-5 (EST)
  - Summer (DST): UTC-4 (EDT)
- ZIP Code: 17815
- Area codes: 570 and 272
- FIPS code: 42-07128
- Website: bloomsburgpa.org

Bloomsburg is a town in and the county seat of Columbia County, Pennsylvania. It is part of Northeastern Pennsylvania and is located 40 miles (64 km) southwest of Wilkes-Barre along the Susquehanna River. As of the 2020 census, Bloomsburg had a population of 12,711.

Bloomsburg is one of two principal communities of the Bloomsburg-Berwick, PA Micropolitan Statistical Area, a micropolitan area that covers all of Columbia county, and had a combined population of 67,295 at the 2010 census.

Bloomsburg is the only incorporated "town" in Pennsylvania. Nonetheless, Bloomsburg operates mostly like a borough, with a council, mayor, fire department, police department and other operations. All other incorporated municipalities in the state are townships, boroughs or cities.

== History ==
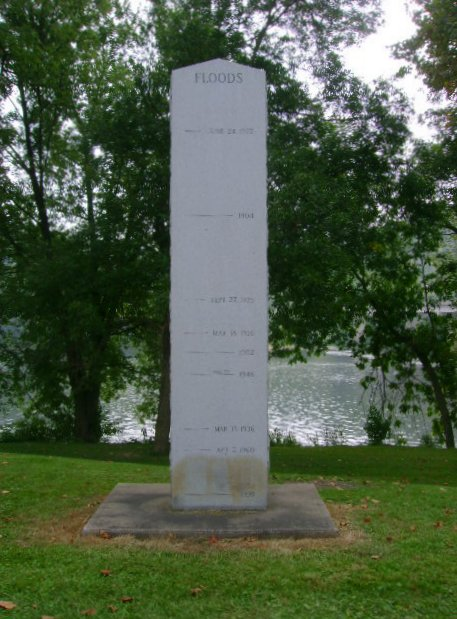
A marker behind the airport showing the height of the river during historic floods (the dirt mark is from the 2006 floods).

The first signs of European settlement date to the year 1772, when James McClure established a log cabin in the area. Until the mid-19th century, it was just a small village, known as Bloom Township. Traditionally, Bloomsburg's founding in 1802 has been ascribed to settler Ludwig Eyer, son of Johann Martin Eyer, acting as agent for his brother Johann Adam. For 75 years after the discovery of ore in the area, Bloomsburg developed a booming iron industry.

Since its incorporation on March 4, 1870, Bloomsburg has held the distinction of being the only town in Pennsylvania. While some home rule municipalities may be styled as towns in their charters, they remain classified as either cities, boroughs, or townships. One particular point of confusion regards McCandless in Allegheny County, which remains a township despite taking the name "Town of McCandless" when adopting a home rule charter in 1975. Bloomsburg's slogan of "The only [incorporated] town in Pennsylvania" reflects its unique status.

The Bloomsburg Historic District and Rupert Covered Bridge No. 56 are listed on the National Register of Historic Places.

On October 28, 2015, a North American Aerospace Defense Command (NORAD) blimp broke free from Aberdeen Proving Ground and headed north, taking out the town's power supply as it went.

On March 9, 2026, the town council of Bloomsburg, Pennsylvania voted unanimously to adopt an official municipal flag, marking a significant addition to the town’s civic identity. The flag was designed by local resident Ayden Pointer and formally approved following its presentation to council.

== Geography ==
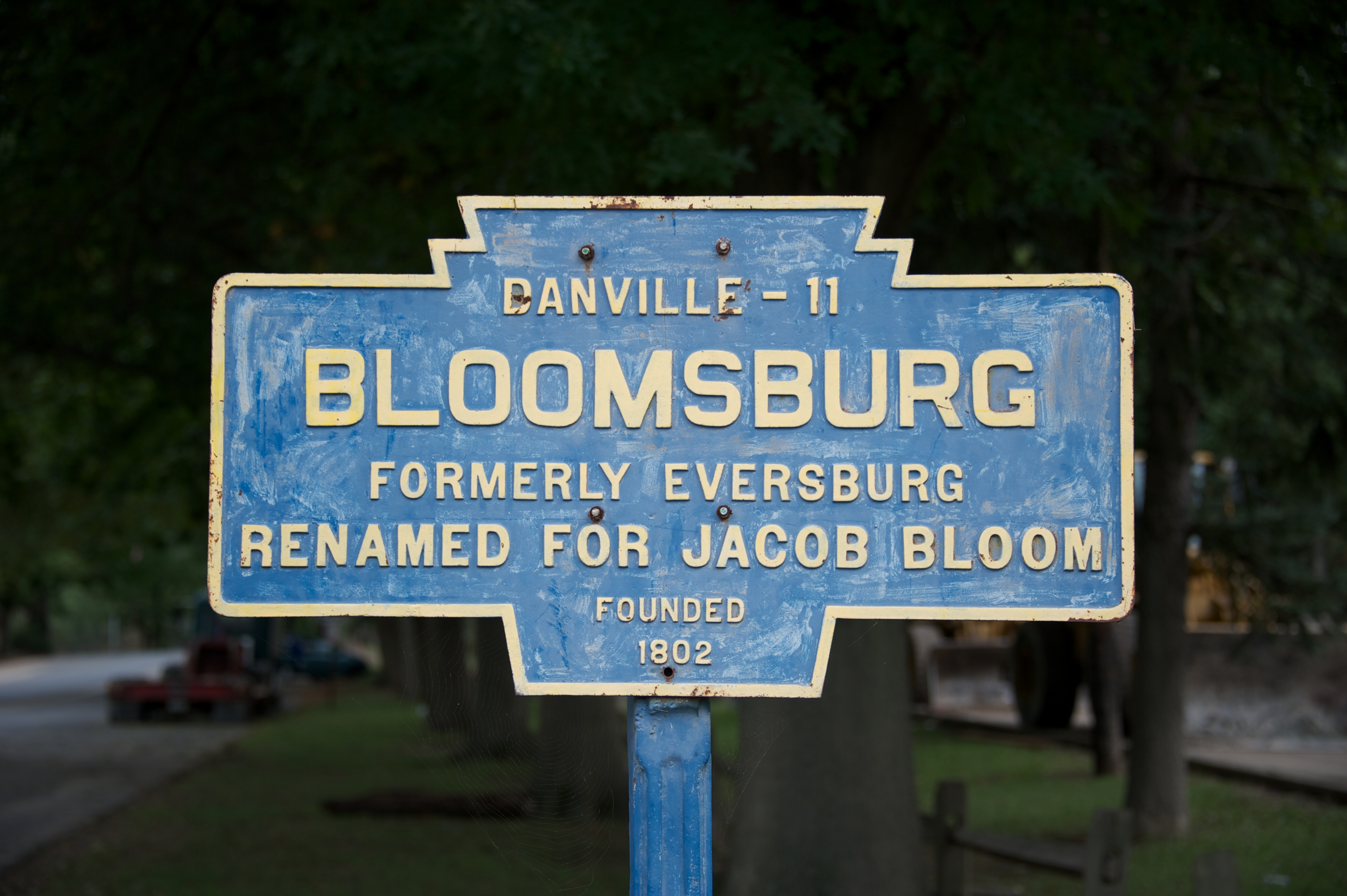
Keystone marker

Bloomsburg is located west of the center of Columbia County, along the north bank of the Susquehanna River and on the east side of Fishing Creek. The southern half of the town occupies level ground along the Susquehanna, while the northern half is occupied by 940-foot-high (290 m) Turkey Hill. The campus of Bloomsburg University of Pennsylvania occupies a large portion of the hill.

According to the United States Census Bureau, Bloomsburg has a total area of 4.7 square miles (12.1 km^{2}), of which 4.4 square miles (11.3 km^{2}) is land and 0.3 square miles (0.9 km^{2}), or 7.22%, is water.

=== Neighboring municipalities ===
- Mount Pleasant Township (north)
- Scott Township (east)
- Catawissa Township (south, separated by the Susquehanna River)
- Montour Township (southwest)
- Hemlock Township (west)

== Climate ==
In January, the average high temperature is 35 °F (2 °C), while the average low temperature is 19 °F (−7 °C). In July, the average high temperature is 85 °F (29 °C), while the average low temperature is 62 °F (17 °C). The month with the least precipitation is February, which has 2.37 inches (60 mm) on average. June experiences the most precipitation: 4.5 inches (110 mm) on average.

== Demographics ==
Historical population
| Census | Pop. | Note | %± |
|---|---|---|---|
| 1820 | 1,626 | | — |
| 1830 | 2,090 | | 28.5% |
| 1840 | 1,774 | | −15.1% |
| 1850 | 3,122 | | 76.0% |
| 1860 | 2,668 | | −14.5% |
| 1870 | 3,341 | | 25.2% |
| 1880 | 3,702 | | 10.8% |
| 1890 | 4,635 | | 25.2% |
| 1900 | 6,170 | | 33.1% |
| 1910 | 7,413 | | 20.1% |
| 1920 | 7,819 | | 5.5% |
| 1930 | 9,093 | | 16.3% |
| 1940 | 9,799 | | 7.8% |
| 1950 | 10,633 | | 8.5% |
| 1960 | 10,655 | | 0.2% |
| 1970 | 11,652 | | 9.4% |
| 1980 | 11,717 | | 0.6% |
| 1990 | 12,439 | | 6.2% |
| 2000 | 12,375 | | −0.5% |
| 2010 | 14,855 | | 20.0% |
| 2020 | 12,711 | | −14.4% |

=== 2020 census ===
As of the 2020 census, Bloomsburg had a population of 12,711. The median age was 23.0 years. 11.4% of residents were under the age of 18 and 11.3% of residents were 65 years of age or older. For every 100 females there were 83.4 males, and for every 100 females age 18 and over there were 81.5 males age 18 and over.

98.7% of residents lived in urban areas, while 1.3% lived in rural areas.

There were 4,535 households in Bloomsburg, of which 18.3% had children under the age of 18 living in them. Of all households, 22.5% were married-couple households, 28.4% were households with a male householder and no spouse or partner present, and 39.4% were households with a female householder and no spouse or partner present. About 41.7% of all households were made up of individuals and 12.3% had someone living alone who was 65 years of age or older.

There were 5,140 housing units, of which 11.8% were vacant. The homeowner vacancy rate was 2.6% and the rental vacancy rate was 9.5%.

Racial composition as of the 2020 census
| Race | Number | Percent |
|---|---|---|
| White | 11,124 | 87.5% |
| Black or African American | 433 | 3.4% |
| American Indian and Alaska Native | 21 | 0.2% |
| Asian | 312 | 2.5% |
| Native Hawaiian and Other Pacific Islander | 3 | 0.0% |
| Some other race | 245 | 1.9% |
| Two or more races | 573 | 4.5% |
| Hispanic or Latino (of any race) | 638 | 5.0% |

=== 2010 census ===
As of the census of 2010, there were 14,855 people residing in the town. The population density was 3,414.9 inhabitants per square mile (1,318.5/km^{2}). There were 5,121 housing units. The racial makeup of the town was 89.6% White, 6.2% African American, 0.10% Native American, 1.6% Asian, 0.04% Pacific Islander and 1.4% from two or more races. Hispanic or Latino of any race were 3.4% of the population.

=== 2000 census ===
According to the 2000 census There were 4,080 households, out of which 19.7% had children under the age of 18 living with them, 31.2% were married couples living together, 9.7% had a female householder with no husband present, and 56.1% were non-families. 35.6% of all households were made up of individuals, and 12.6% had someone living alone who was 65 years of age or older. The average household size was 2.30 and the average family size was 2.83.

In the town, the population was spread out, with 12.3% under the age of 18, 45.5% from 18 to 24, 18.6% from 25 to 44, 12.7% from 45 to 64, and 11.0% who were 65 years of age or older. The median age was 22 years. For every 100 females, there were 77.5 males. For every 100 females age 18 and over, there were 74.7 males.

The median income for a household in the town was $24,868, and the median income for a family was $39,806. Males had a median income of $29,940 versus $19,961 for females. The per capita income for the town was $12,819. About 10.5% of families and 31.2% of the population were below the poverty line, including 19.8% of those under age 18 and 15.2% of those age 65 or over.

== Government ==
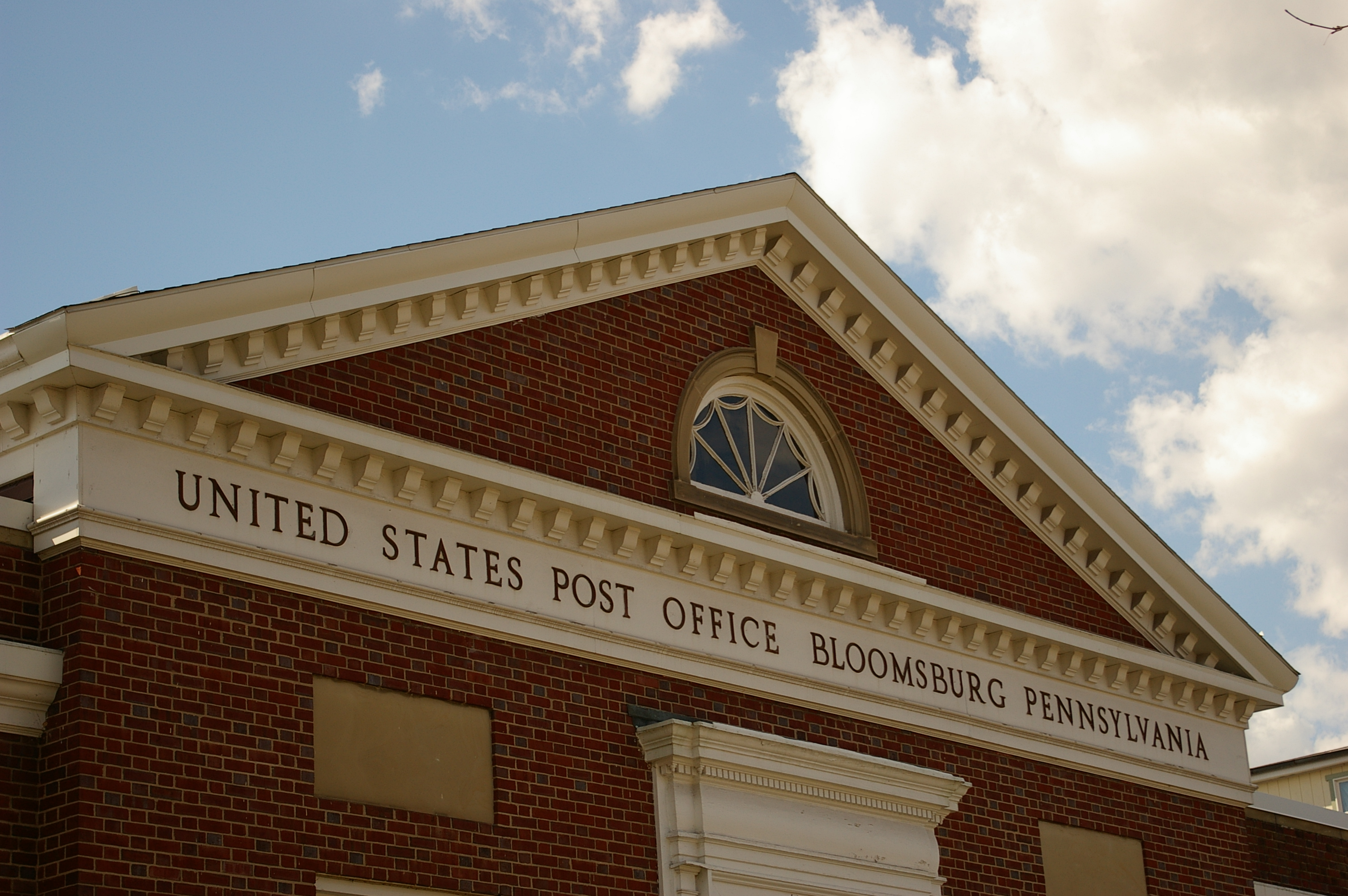
Top of the Bloomsburg post office

The town of Bloomsburg is administered by a town council of six members and the mayor. As an incorporated town, the mayor can vote along with the council on every motion. This is different from most borough councils, where there are seven council members and the mayor can only vote to break ties.

== Education ==
Bloomsburg is served by the Bloomsburg Area School District, which has about 1,800 students enrolled from the town itself, western, and southeastern suburbs.

Columbia-Montour Area Vocational-Technical School in Bloomsburg has numerous secondary education trade programs.

The Central Columbia School District has approximately 2,100 students and encompasses the eastern and northern suburbs of Bloomsburg.

Bloomsburg University, one of the 10 institutions in the Pennsylvania State System of Higher Education, had a 2012 enrollment of 10,000 full-time undergraduate and 846 graduate students.

Additionally, there are several private religious and non-denominational schools in and around the immediate vicinity of Bloomsburg.

== Recreation ==
The one park in Bloomsburg is the 43-acre (170,000 m^{2}) Town Park, established in 1927. The Norris E. Rock Memorial Swimming Pool and the Bloomsburg Skate Park immediately adjoin the park. The town has also purchased the former Streater Farm at the confluence of Fishing Creek and the Susquehanna River, which is being converted into athletic fields, a nature preserve, and a walking path that will be tied in with the existing Columbia-Montour Rails-to-Trails program.

== Notable businesses ==
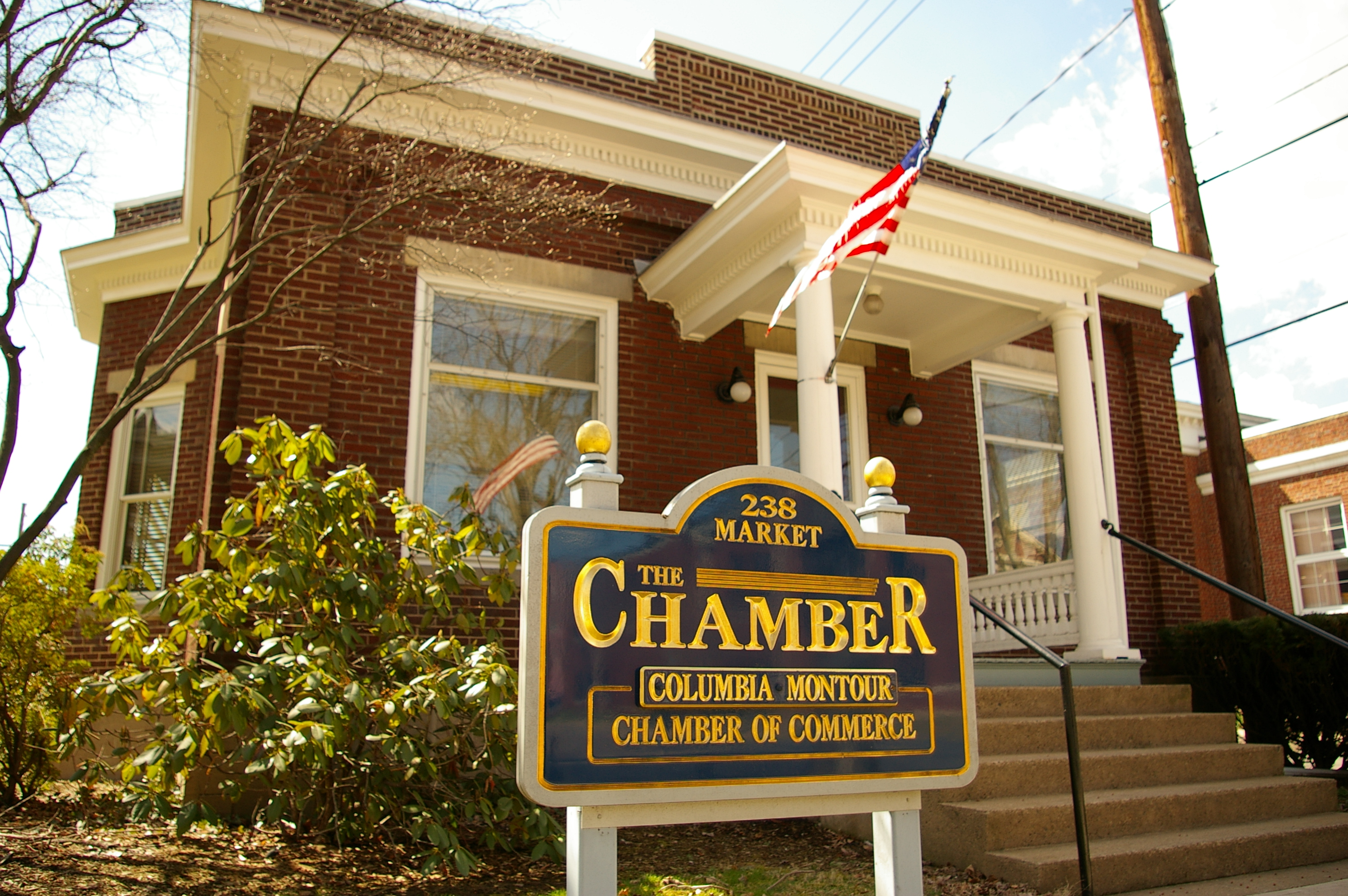
Columbia Montour Chamber of Commerce

On May 31, 2009, Bloomsburg Mills, Inc., after 120 years of weaving and finishing fabrics in Bloomsburg, went out of business, closing both a local plant and a dye plant in Monroe, North Carolina. The closure affected over 200 employees in both locations.

In early 2014 Windsor Foods (formerly Del Monte) closed their doors, affecting more than 160 employees. Company officials cited flooding as a result of Tropical Storm Lee as one of their reasons for the plant closing.

== Culture ==
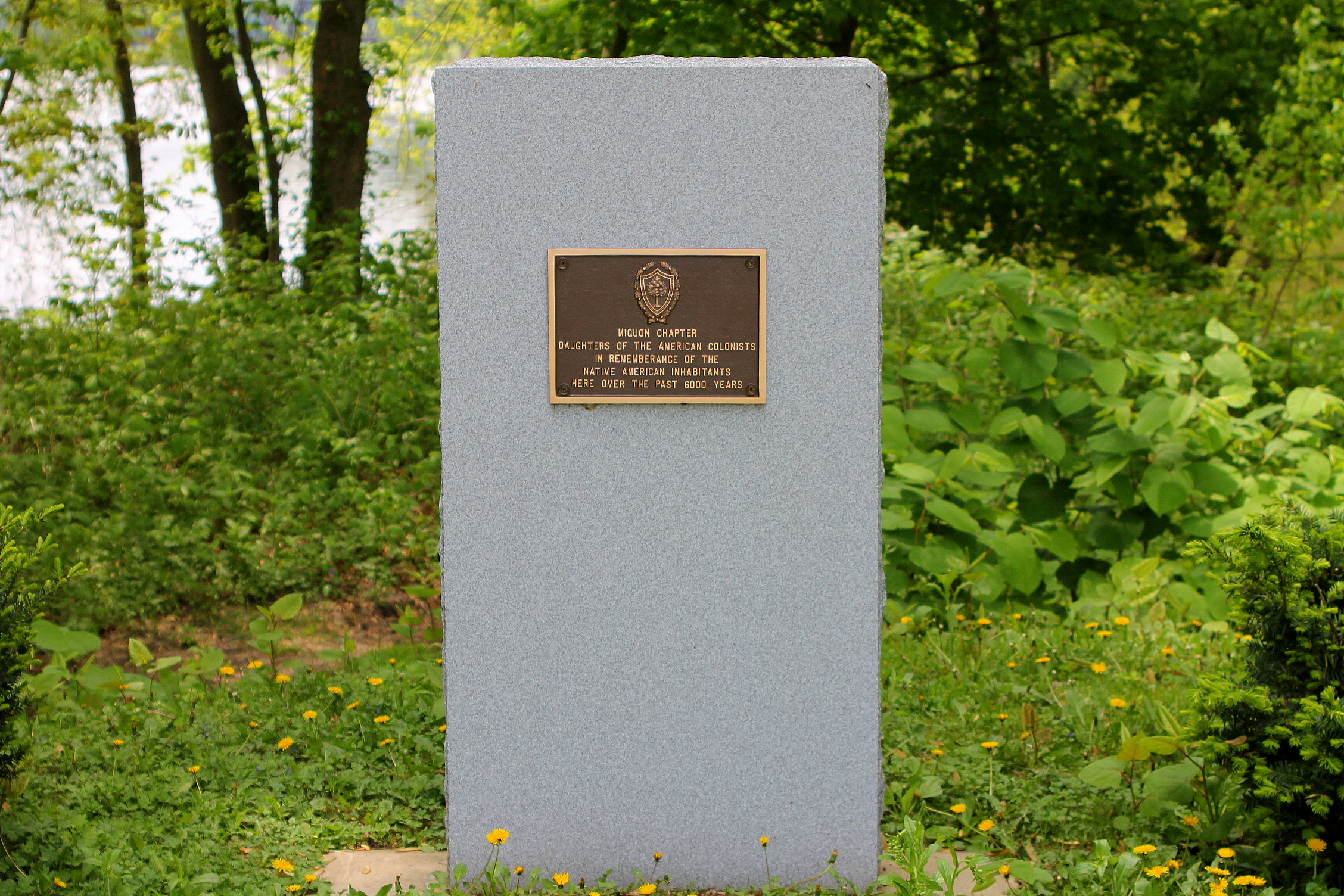
A monument set up by the Daughters of the American Colonists honoring Native American settlement in Bloomsburg

Bloomsburg is home to the Bloomsburg Theatre Ensemble, founded in 1978 to establish a resident professional ensemble for the production of quality entertainment and educational programs for the region, and to promote the arts.

The Bloomsburg Public Library was founded in 1899 and funded jointly by the taxpayers of Bloomsburg, Scott Township, and Hemlock Township.

Bloomsburg is also home to the Bloomsburg Fair (the largest fair in the state of Pennsylvania) which, since 1855, is a traditional agricultural fair.

The David Stroup Fountain, erected in 1892, is located at Bloomsburg's Market Square. David Stroup was the owner of a local candy shop who left money in his will to the town's water works. The current fountain is a restored version of the original, which was dismantled in 1966 due to its deterioration but was put back together in 1982 by Daniel and Michael McCloskey. The original crane sculpture, which was at the top of the fountain, was lost in storage until 2005, when it was cleaned, repaired, and replaced on the fountain.

The Children's Museum is at 2 West Seventh Street.

== Local media ==
Bloomsburg is home to one daily newspaper, the Press Enterprise. Bloomsburg has two online news sites: The Bloomsburg News covering all of Bloomsburg activities, and BloomUtoday.com covering Bloomsburg University as well as local news. The Voice, Bloomsburg University's student newspaper and BUnow, the campus's online, student-run newspaper, cover university-related and more traditional world and entertainment news.

Several radio stations serve the area, including WHLM, WMMZ, and WCFT-FM. The town is primarily served by Service Electric Cable TV and receives both the Wilkes-Barre/Scranton market television stations and Philadelphia stations.

== Infrastructure ==
=== Transportation ===
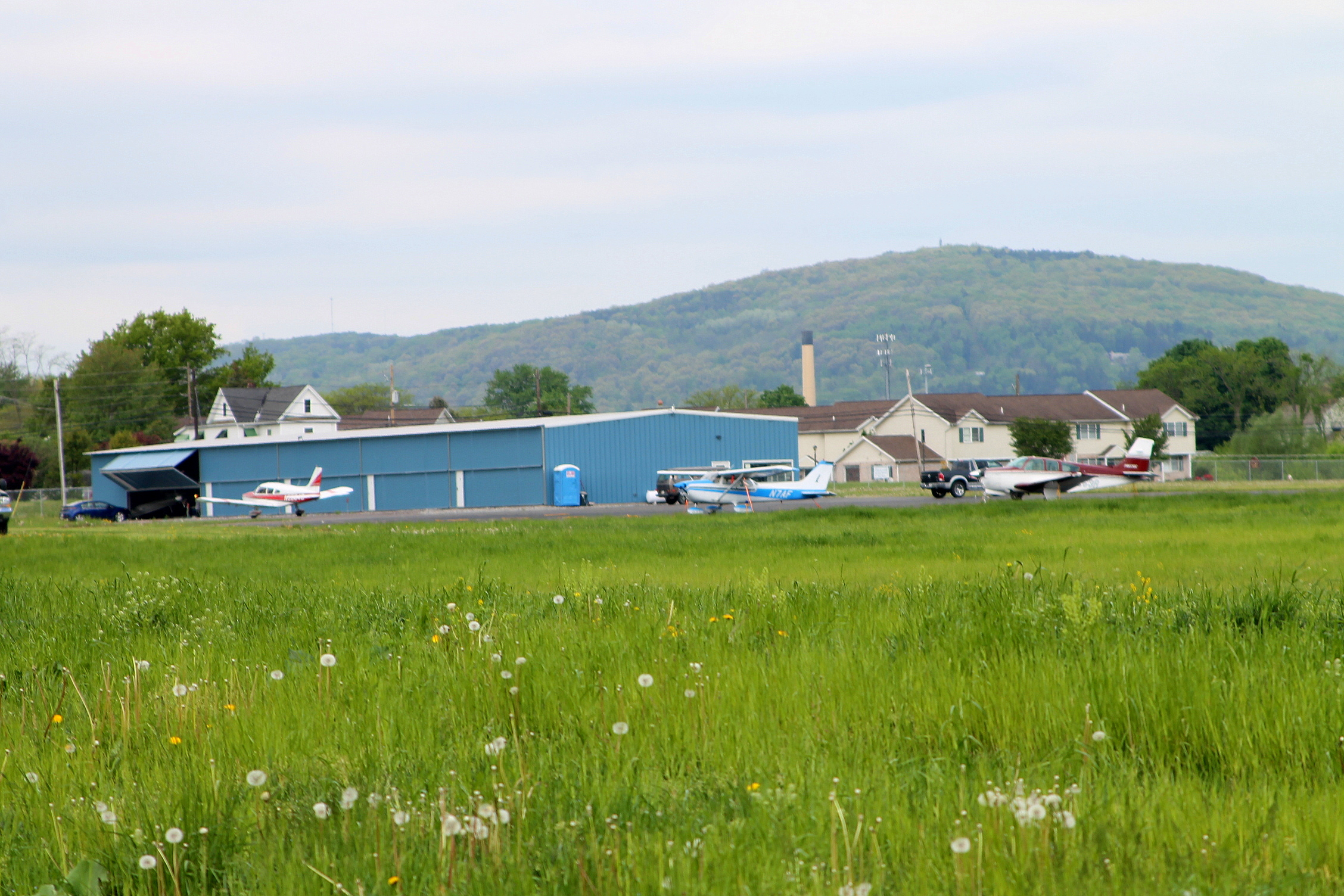
Bloomsburg Municipal Airport

Bloomsburg Municipal Airport is in the southeast corner of Bloomsburg, along the Susquehanna River.

The main highways in Bloomsburg are U.S. Route 11, Pennsylvania Route 42 (serves the Bloomsburg Fairgrounds) and Pennsylvania Route 487. Interstate 80 passes north of the town, with access from Exit 232 (PA 42) to the northwest of town and Exit 236 (PA 487) northeast of town. US 11 leads west 9 miles (14 km) to Danville and east 13 miles (21 km) to Berwick, both on the Susquehanna River. PA 42 leads northwest 10 miles (16 km) to Millville and south 22 miles (35 km) to Ashland, while PA 487 leads northeast 17 miles (27 km) to Benton and southwest 15 miles (24 km) to Elysburg. Via Interstate 80 and connecting highways it is 44 miles (71 km) northeast to Wilkes-Barre and 42 miles (68 km) northwest to Williamsport. Harrisburg, the state capital, is 80 miles (130 km) to the south via PA 42 and Interstate 81.

=== Utilities ===
PPL Corporation in Allentown provides electricity to Bloomsburg. Natural gas in the town is provided by UGI Penn Natural Gas. Cable television in Bloomsburg is provided by Service Electric Cable and CATV Service. Water in the town is provided by United Water PA.

== Notable people ==
- Lacy J. Dalton, country music singer-songwriter
- Doug Davis, former catcher for the Texas Rangers
- Paul C. Genereux, US Army brigadier general
- Paul Hartzell, baseball player
- Sean Panikkar, opera singer
- Carl Risch, Assistant Secretary of State for Consular Affairs within the U.S. Department of State
- Krysten Ritter, actress
- Dan Washburn, writer
- Benny Montgomery, baseball player
- Jared Verse, football player
- William Trump, Coast Guardsman at the D-Day Normandy landings
- David Jewett Waller, Sr., civic leader and minister
