= List of Pennsylvania railroads =

The following railroads operate in the U.S. state of Pennsylvania.

== Common freight carriers ==
- Aliquippa and Ohio River Railroad (AOR) Genesee & Wyoming
- Allegheny Valley Railroad (AVR)
- Allentown and Auburn Railroad (ALLN)
- BD Highspire Holdings (BDHH)
- Belvidere and Delaware River Railway (BDRV)
- Brandywine Valley Railroad (BVRY)
- Buffalo and Pittsburgh Railroad (BPRR) (Genesee & Wyoming)
- Canadian National Railway (CN) through subsidiary Bessemer and Lake Erie Railroad (BLE)
- Canadian Pacific Kansas City (CPKC) through subsidiary Delaware and Hudson Railway (DH)
- Central New York Railroad (CNYK)
- Chestnut Ridge Railroad (CHR)
- Columbia and Reading Railway (CORY)
- Conrail Shared Assets Operations (CRR)
  - operates Philadelphia Belt Line Railroad (PBL)
- CSX (CSX)
- Delaware-Lackawanna Railroad (DL)
- East Erie Commercial Railroad (EEC)
- East Penn Railroad (ESPN) (Regional Rail, LLC)
- Elizabethtown Industrial Railroad (EZR)
- Everett Railroad (EV)
- Gettysburg and Northern Railroad (GET)
- Juniata Valley Railroad (JVRR) North Shore Railroad)
- Kasgro Rail Lines (KRL)
- Kiski Junction Railroad (KJR)
- Landisville Railroad (LVR)
- Lehigh Railway (LRWY)
- Lehigh Valley Rail Management (LVRB, LVRC, LVRJ)
- Luzerne and Susquehanna Railway (LS)
- Lycoming Valley Railroad (LVRR) (North Shore Railroad (Pennsylvania))
- Maryland Midland Railway (MMID) (Genesee & Wyoming)
- Middletown & Hummelstown Railroad (MIDH)
- New Castle Industrial Railroad (NCIR)
- New Hope Railroad (NHRR)
- New York, Susquehanna and Western Railway (NYSW)
- Nittany and Bald Eagle Railroad (NBER) (North Shore Railroad (Pennsylvania))
- Norfolk Southern (NS)
- NDC Railroad (NDC)
- North Shore Railroad (NSHR)
- Oil Creek and Titusville Railroad (OCTL)
- Pennsylvania & Southern Railway (PSCC)
- Pennsylvania Northeastern Railroad (PN)
- Pennsylvania Southwestern Railroad (PSWR)
- Pittsburgh, Allegheny and McKees Rocks Railroad (PAM)
- Pittsburgh and Ohio Central Railroad (POHC) (Genesee & Wyoming)
- Reading Blue Mountain and Northern Railroad (RBMN)
- R.J. Corman Railroad/Allentown Line (RJCN)
- R.J. Corman Railroad/Pennsylvania Lines (RJCP)
- Shamokin Valley Railroad (SVRR) (North Shore Railroad (Pennsylvania))
- SMS Rail Lines (SRL)
  - Operates Penn Jersey Rail Lines
- Southwest Pennsylvania Railroad (SWP)
- Strasburg Railroad (SRC)
- Tyburn Railroad (TYBR) (Regional Rail, LLC)
- Union Railroad (URR)
- Union County Industrial Railroad (UCIR) (North Shore Railroad (Pennsylvania))
- Upper Merion & Plymouth Railroad (UMP)
- Wellsboro and Corning Railroad (WCOR) (Genesee & Wyoming)
- Western New York and Pennsylvania Railroad (WNYP)
- Wheeling and Lake Erie Railway (WE)
- York Railway (YRC) (Genesee and Wyoming)
  - Operates Maryland and Pennsylvania Railroad (Genesee & Wyoming) and Yorkrail
- Youngstown and Southeastern Railroad (YSRR)

== Private freight carriers ==
- Cumberland Mine Railroad
- Alpha Natural Resources
- Conshohocken Recycling and Rail Transfer, Inc (CRRT)
- Juniata Terminal Company (JTFS)
- Leetsdale Industrial Terminal Railway (LIT)

== Passenger carriers ==
- Allentown and Auburn Railroad (heritage railroad)
- Amtrak (AMTK) (national passenger rail)
- CamTran (Johnstown mass transit agency operates Johnstown Inclined Plane)
- Colebrookdale Railroad (heritage railroad)
- Delaware Lackawanna RailRoad
- East Broad Top Railroad and Coal Company
- Fayette Central Railroad (tourist trains operating over Southwest Pennsylvania Railroad trackage)
- Kiski Junction Railroad (working railroad that also operates tourist trains)
- Lehigh Gorge Scenic Railway (heritage railroad)
- Lehigh Lackawanna RailRoad
- Middletown and Hummelstown Railroad (working railroad, but with emphasis on tourist trains)
- New Hope Railroad (working railroad that also operates tourist trains)
- New Jersey Transit Rail Operations (Atlantic City Line commuter train travels from Philadelphia)
- Oil Creek and Titusville Lines (working railroad, but with emphasis on tourist trains)
- Pioneer Lines Scenic Railway (heritage railroad)
- Port Authority of Allegheny County (Pittsburgh mass transit agency that operates The T light rail, the Monongahela Incline, and the Duquesne Incline)
- Port Authority Transit Corporation (Bi-state authority operates Philadelphia-Camden County subway line)
- SEPTA (Philadelphia mass transit agency that operates SEPTA Regional Rail commuter lines, the Philadelphia Subway, and a variety of suburban light rail lines)
- Strasburg Railroad (heritage railroad)
- Tioga Central Railroad (heritage railroad)
- Wanamaker, Kempton and Southern Railroad (heritage railroad)
- West Chester Railroad (heritage railroad)

== Museums and historic sites ==
- Allegheny Portage Railroad
- Howard Tunnel
- Electric City Trolley Museum
- Gallitzin Tunnel
- Horseshoe Curve
- Mars Station, Pennsylvania
- Pennsylvania Trolley Museum
- Railroad Museum of Pennsylvania
- Reading Company Technical & Historical Society
- Rockhill Trolley Museum
- Steamtown National Historic Site
- Western Pennsylvania Model Railroad Museum

== Defunct railroads ==
Name	Mark	System (Note: This is one or more of the Class I railroads that the railroad became part of, if any.)	From	To	Successor	Notes
Addison and Pennsylvania Railway		B&O	1887	1898	Susquehanna and New York Railroad	
Addison and Northern Pennsylvania Railway		B&O	1882	1887	Addison and Pennsylvania Railway	
Aliquippa and Southern Railroad	ALQS		1906	2002	Aliquippa and Ohio River Railroad	
Allegheny Railroad	ALY		1985	1992	Allegheny and Eastern Railroad	
Allegheny and Bald Eagle Railroad, Coal and Iron Company		PRR	1839	1859	Bellefonte and Snowshoe Railroad	
Allegheny and Eastern Railroad	ALY		1992			Still exists as a nonoperating subsidiary of the Buffalo and Pittsburgh Railroad
Allegheny Junction Railroad			1898	1907	N/A	
Allegheny and South Side Railway	AYSS		1892			
Allegheny Southern Railway	ASRW		1982	1985	Everett Railroad	
Allegheny Terminal Company			1899			
Allegheny Valley Railroad		PRR	1852	1891	Allegheny Valley Railway	
Allegheny Valley Railway		PRR	1892	1910	Pennsylvania Railroad	
Allegheny and Western Railway		B&O	1896			Still exists as a nonoperating subsidiary of CSX Transportation
Allentown Railroad		RDG	1853	1945	Reading Company	
Allentown Terminal Railroad		CNJ/ RDG	1888	1976	Consolidated Rail Corporation	
Altoona and Beech Creek Railroad			1897	1910	Altoona, Juniata and Northern Railway	
Altoona, Clearfield and Northern Railroad			1891	1897	Altoona and Beech Creek Railroad	
Altoona, Juniata and Northern Railway			1910	1913	Altoona Northern Railroad	
Altoona Northern Railroad			1912	1919	N/A	
Altoona and Philipsburg Connecting Railroad			1892	1906	New York and Pittsburgh Air Line Railroad	
Anthracite Railway	ATRW		1983	1989	Blue Mountain and Reading Railroad	
Arnot and Pine Creek Railroad		ERIE	1881	1937	Tioga Railroad	
Atlantic and Great Western Railroad		ERIE	1871	1880	New York, Pennsylvania and Ohio Railroad	
Atlantic and Great Western Railroad		ERIE	1858	1865	Atlantic and Great Western Railway	
Atlantic and Great Western Railway		ERIE	1865	1871	Atlantic and Great Western Railroad	
Auburn and Port Clinton Railroad		RDG	1854	1857	Allentown Railroad	
Altoona and Wopsononock Railroad			1890	1891	Altoona, Clearfield and Northern Railroad	
Bachman Valley Railroad		WM	1871	1886	Baltimore and Harrisburg Railway	
Bald Eagle Valley Railroad		PRR	1861	1908	Pennsylvania Railroad	
Baltimore Coal and Union Railroad Company		D&H	1868	1871	Northern Coal and Iron Company	
Baltimore and Cumberland Valley Railroad		WM	1878	1917	Western Maryland Railway	
Baltimore and Cumberland Valley Railroad Extension Company		WM	1880			Still exists as a nonoperating subsidiary of CSX Transportation
Baltimore and Hanover Railroad		WM	1877	1886	Baltimore and Harrisburg Railway	
Baltimore and Harrisburg Railway		WM	1886	1917	Western Maryland Railway	
Baltimore and Harrisburg Railway (Eastern Extension)		WM	1888	1917	Western Maryland Railway	
Baltimore and Harrisburg Railway (Western Extension)		WM	1888	1917	Western Maryland Railway	
Baltimore and Lehigh Railroad			1891	1894	York Southern Railroad	
Baltimore and Ohio Railroad	B&O, BO	B&O	1876	1987	Chesapeake and Ohio Railway	
Baltimore and Ohio Railroad in Pennsylvania		B&O	1912	1980	Baltimore and Ohio Railroad	
Baltimore and Ohio Short Line Railroad		B&O	1885	1887	Wheeling, Pittsburgh and Baltimore Railroad	
Baltimore and Philadelphia Railroad		B&O	1883	1989	CSX Transportation	
Baltimore and Philadelphia Railway		B&O	1883	1883	Baltimore and Philadelphia Railroad	
Bangor and Bath Railroad		DL&W	1880	1880	Bangor and Portland Railway	
Bangor and Portland Railway		DL&W	1879	1909	Delaware, Lackawanna and Western Railroad	
Barclay Railroad		LV	1891	1902	Susquehanna and New York Railroad	
Barclay Coal Company		LV	1862	1891	Barclay Railroad	
Barclay Railroad and Coal Company		LV	1854	1862	Barclay Coal Company	
Bare Rock Railroad			1892			
Bear Creek Railroad		B&LE	1865	1867	Shenango and Allegheny Railroad	
Beaver Connecting Railroad						
Beaver and Ellwood Railroad		PLE	1890	1916	Pittsburgh and Lake Erie Railroad	
Beaver Meadow Railroad and Coal Company		LV	1830	1864	Lehigh Valley Railroad	
Beaver Meadow, Tresckow and New Boston Railroad		CNJ	1894		N/A	
Beaver Valley Railroad		PLE/ PRR	1899	1941	Cleveland and Pittsburgh Railroad, Pittsburgh and Lake Erie Railroad	
Bedford Railroad			1859	1864	Huntingdon and Broad Top Mountain Railroad and Coal Company	
Bedford and Blair County Railroad		PRR	1893	1894	Pennsylvania Midland Railroad	
Bedford and Bridgeport Railroad		PRR	1868	1891	Bedford and Bridgeport Railway	
Bedford and Bridgeport Railway		PRR	1891	1911	Hollidaysburg, Bedford and Cumberland Railroad	
Bedford and Hollidaysburg Railroad		PRR	1902	1911	Hollidaysburg, Bedford and Cumberland Railroad	
Beech Creek Railroad		NYC	1886	1976	Consolidated Rail Corporation	
Beech Creek, Clearfield and Southwestern Railroad		NYC	1883	1886	Beech Creek Railroad	
Beech Creek Extension Railroad		NYC	1901	1961	New York Central Railroad	
Bellefonte and Buffalo Run Railroad			1882	1882	Buffalo Run, Bellefonte and Bald Eagle Railroad	
Bellefonte Central Railroad	BFC		1892	1985	Nittany and Bald Eagle Railroad	
Bellefonte, Nittany and Lemont Railroad		PRR	1883	1889	Bald Eagle Valley Railroad	
Bellefonte and Snowshoe Railroad		PRR	1859	1881	Bald Eagle Valley Railroad	
Bell's Gap Railroad		PRR	1871	1889	Pennsylvania and North Western Railroad	
Bells Run Railroad			1903			
Belvidere Delaware Railroad		PRR	1896	1958	United New Jersey Railroad and Canal Company	
Berks and Chester Railroad		RDG	1864	1866	Wilmington and Reading Railroad	
Berks County Railroad		RDG	1871	1874	Reading and Lehigh Railroad	
Berlin Railroad		B&O	1879	1912	Baltimore and Ohio Railroad in Pennsylvania	
Berlin Branch Railroad			1876	1903	East Berlin Railway	
Bethlehem Railroad		LNE	1861	1864	Lehigh and Lackawanna Railroad	
Big Level and Bradford Railroad		B&O	1881	1883	Pittsburgh, Bradford and Buffalo Railway	
Big Level and Kinzua Railroad		B&O	1881	1911	Pittsburgh and Western Railroad	
Binghamton, Towanda and Western Railway		LV	1902	1902	Susquehanna and New York Railroad	
Blacklick and Yellow Creek Railroad			1904	1911	Cambria and Indiana Railroad	
Blacksville and Western Railway		MGA	1917	1917	Morgantown and Wheeling Railway	
Bloom Run Railroad			1902			
Bloomsburg and Sullivan Railroad	BBS	RDG	1883	1928	Reading Company	
Blossburg Coal Mining and Railroad Company			1866	1885	Erie Railroad	
Blue Mountain and Reading Railroad	BMRG		1983	1995	Reading Blue Mountain & Northern Railroad	
Bradford Railroad		PRR	1911	1932	Western New York and Pennsylvania Railway	
Bradford Railway		PRR	1881	1911	Bradford Railroad	
Bradford, Bordell and Kinzua Railroad			1880	1892	Bradford, Bordell and Kinzua Railway	
Bradford, Bordell and Kinzua Railway			1892	1903	Buffalo, Bradford and Kane Railroad	
Bradford, Bordell and Smethport Railroad			1880	1892	Bradford, Bordell and Kinzua Railway	
Bradford and Foster Brook Railway			1877	1879	N/A	
Bradford Industrial Rail	BR		1993	2004	Buffalo and Pittsburgh Railroad	
Bradford and State Line Railroad		B&O	1881	1881	Rochester and Pittsburgh Railroad	
Bradford and Western Pennsylvania Railroad			1891			
Bridgeport and Widemire Railway		B&O	1896	1913	Clearfield and Mahoning Railway	
Bristol Industrial Terminal Railway	BITY		1992	1997	Penn Eastern Rail Lines	
Brock Railroad			1903			
Brockport and Shawmut Railroad		ERIE	1886	1940	New York, Lake Erie and Western Coal and Railroad Company	
Brockwayville and Punxsutawney Railroad		B&O	1882	1891	Buffalo, Rochester and Pittsburgh Railway	
Brooks Mills and Altoona Railroad		PRR	1894	1894	Pennsylvania Midland Railroad	
Brookville Railway			1896			
Brookville and Mahoning Railroad		PS&N	1903	1909	Pittsburg and Shawmut Railroad	
Brownstone and Middletown Railroad			1892		N/A	
Brownsville Railway		PRR	1875	1880	Pittsburgh, Virginia and Charleston Railway	
Brownsville and New Haven Railway		B&O	1876	1882	Ohio and Baltimore Short Line Railway	
Brownsville and State Line Railroad		PRR	1893	1894	Pittsburgh, Virginia and Charleston Railway	
Bruce and Clairton Railroad		P&WV	1901	1902	West Side Belt Railroad	
Buffalo and Bradford Railroad		ERIE	1856	1859	Buffalo, Bradford and Pittsburgh Railroad	
Buffalo, Bradford and Kane Railroad			1904	1931	N/A	Operated by Mount Jewett, Kinzua and Riterville Railroad
Buffalo, Bradford and Pittsburgh Railroad		ERIE	1859	1941	Erie Railroad	
Buffalo, Chautauqua Lake and Pittsburgh Railway		PRR	1879	1880	Pittsburgh, Titusville and Buffalo Railway	
Buffalo, Corry and Pittsburgh Railroad		PRR	1867	1872	Corry and State Line Railroad	
Buffalo, Cleveland and Chicago Railway		NKP	1881	1881	New York, Chicago and St. Louis Railway	
Buffalo Coal and Iron Company		DL&W	1856	1860	Continental Coal Company	
Buffalo and Erie Railroad		NYC	1867	1869	Lake Shore and Michigan Southern Railway	
Buffalo, New York and Philadelphia Railroad		PRR	1883	1887	Western New York and Pennsylvania Railway of Pennsylvania	
Buffalo, New York and Philadelphia Railway		PRR	1871	1883	Buffalo, New York and Philadelphia Railroad	
Buffalo, Pittsburgh and Western Railroad		PRR	1881	1883	Buffalo, New York and Philadelphia Railroad	
Buffalo, Rochester and Pittsburgh Railway	BR&P	B&O	1887			Still exists as a nonoperating subsidiary of CSX Transportation
Buffalo Run, Bellefonte and Bald Eagle Railroad			1882	1891	Bellefonte Central Railroad	
Buffalo and St. Marys Railroad		PS&N	1895	1897	Buffalo, St. Marys and Southwestern Railroad	
Buffalo, St. Marys and Southwestern Railroad		PS&N	1897	1899	Pittsburg, Shawmut and Northern Railroad	
Buffalo and Susquehanna Railroad	B&S	B&O	1891	1954	Baltimore and Ohio Railroad	
Buffalo and Susquehanna Railway		B&O	1907	1910	N/A	Leased the Buffalo and Susquehanna Railroad
Buffalo Valley Railroad		B&O	1868	1879	Berlin Railroad	
Buffalo and Washington Railway		PRR	1866	1871	Buffalo, New York and Philadelphia Railway	
Bustleton Railroad		PRR	1891	1902	Connecting Railway	
Bustleton and Eastern Railroad		PRR	1893	1893	Philadelphia, Bustleton and Trenton Railroad	
Butler and Pittsburgh Railroad		B&LE	1896	1897	Pittsburg, Bessemer and Lake Erie Railroad	
Caledonia Iron, Land and Railroad Company		PRR	1867	1869	Southern Pennsylvania Iron and Railroad Company	
Cambria and Clearfield Railroad		PRR	1887	1903	Cambria and Clearfield Railway	
Cambria and Clearfield Railway		PRR	1903	1913	Pennsylvania Railroad	
Cambria County Railroad		NYC	1896	1898	Beech Creek Railroad	
Cambria and Indiana Railroad	CI		1911	1994	N/A	
Cammal and Black Forest Railway			1894			
Canoe Creek Railroad		NYC	1900	1901	Beech Creek Extension Railroad	
Carbon Limestone Railroad		PLE	1894	1894	Mahoning State Line Railroad	
Catasauqua and Fogelsville Railroad		RDG	1854	1944	Reading Company	
Catawissa Railroad		RDG	1860	1953	Reading Company	
Catawissa, Williamsport and Erie Railroad		RDG	1849	1860	Catawissa Railroad	
Central Columbiana and Pennsylvania Railway	CQPA		2001	2004	Ohio and Pennsylvania Railroad	
Central Railroad of New Jersey	CNJ	CNJ	1952	1976	Consolidated Rail Corporation	
Central Railroad of New Jersey	CNJ	CNJ	1871	1946	Central Railroad of Pennsylvania	
Central Railroad of Pennsylvania	CRP	CNJ	1944	1976	Consolidated Rail Corporation	
Central Railroad of Pennsylvania			1891	1918	N/A	
Central Pennsylvania Railroad			1889	1891	Central Railroad of Pennsylvania	
Central Pennsylvania Railroad (Eastern Extension)			1890	1891	Central Railroad of Pennsylvania	
Central Pennsylvania and Western Railroad		PRR	1893	1902	Susquehanna, Bloomsburg, and Berwick Railroad	
Central Trunk Railway		NYC	1868	1909	Jamestown, Franklin and Clearfield Railroad	
Chambersburg and Gettysburg Railroad			1890			
Chambersburg, Greencastle and Hagerstown Railroad		PRR	1853	1859	Franklin Railroad	
Chapman and Lehigh Railway		DL&W	1881	1882	Bangor and Portland Railway	
Chartiers Railway		PRR	1867	1907	Pittsburgh, Cincinnati, Chicago and St. Louis Railway	
Chartiers Connecting Railroad		PRR	1881	1899	Chartiers Railway	
Chartiers and Mansfield Valley Railway		PLE/ PRR	1880	1881	Pittsburgh, Chartiers and Youghiogheny Railway	
Chartiers Southern Railway		MGA	1906	1929	Monongahela Railway	
Chartiers Valley Railroad		PRR	1853	1866	Chartiers Railway	
Cheat Haven Railroad		B&O	1902	1907	Fairmont, Morgantown and Pittsburg Railroad	
Cheat Haven and Bruceton Railroad		B&O	1911	1965	N/A	
Cheat River Railroad		B&O	1896	1907	Fairmont, Morgantown and Pittsburg Railroad	
Cherry Grove Railroad			1884	1894	Tionesta Valley Railway	
Cherry Springs Railroad		B&O	1893	1893	Buffalo and Susquehanna Railroad	
Cherry Tree and Dixonville Railroad		NYC/ PRR	1903	1970	Penn Central Transportation Company	
Chesapeake and Ohio Railway	CO		1987	1987	CSX Transportation	
Chester Creek Railroad		PRR	1866	1917	Philadelphia, Baltimore and Washington Railroad	
Chester and Delaware River Railroad		RDG	1871	1923	Reading Company	
Chester Valley Railroad		RDG	1850	1888	Philadelphia and Chester Valley Railroad	
Chester Valley Railway	CHTS		1996	1997	Penn Eastern Rail Lines	
Chestnut Hill Railroad		RDG	1848	1948	Reading Company	
Chestnut Ridge Railroad of Pennsylvania			1898	1902	Chestnut Ridge Railway	
Chestnut Ridge Railway	CHR		1902	2003	Chestnut Ridge Railroad	Owned by New Jersey Zinc and successors from 1907
Cheswick and Harmar Railroad	CHH		1901	1972	N/A	Formerly owned by Duquesne Light
Clarion and Jefferson Railroad			1904	1904	Pittsburgh, Summerville and Clarion Railroad	
Clarion River Railway			1889	1948	N/A	
Clarion and Summerville Railroad			1900	1901	Clarion, Summerville and Pittsburgh Railroad	
Clarion, Summerville and Pittsburgh Railroad			1901	1903		
Clearfield and Jefferson Railway		PRR	1885	1889	Bell's Gap Railroad	
Clearfield and Mahoning Railway		B&O	1892			Still exists as a nonoperating subsidiary of R.J. Corman Railroad/Pennsylvania Lines
Clearfield Southern Railroad		NYC	1898	1905	Beech Creek Extension Railroad	
Cleveland, Painesville and Ashtabula Railroad		NYC	1854	1868	Lake Shore Railway	
Cleveland and Pittsburgh Railroad		PRR	1850	1976	Consolidated Rail Corporation	
Coal Glen Railroad			1889			
Colebrook Valley Railroad		PRR	1881	1886	Cornwall and Lebanon Railroad	
Colebrookdale Railroad		RDG	1865	1945	Reading Company	
Columbia Bank		PRR	1852	1864	Columbia Bridge Company	
Columbia Bank and Bridge Company		PRR	1837	1852	Columbia Bank	
Columbia Bridge Company		PRR	1864	1871	Pennsylvania Railroad	
Columbia Bridge Company		PRR	1835	1837	Columbia Bank and Bridge Company	
Columbia and Maryland Line Railroad		PRR	1860	1864	Columbia and Port Deposit Railroad	
Columbia and Port Deposit Railroad		PRR	1864	1890	Columbia and Port Deposit Railway	
Columbia and Port Deposit Railway		PRR	1890	1916	Philadelphia, Baltimore and Washington Railroad	
Columbus and Erie Railroad		ERIE	1905	1941	Erie Railroad	
Conemaugh and Black Lick Railroad	CBL		1923		Lehigh Valley Rail Management	
Conewango Valley Railroad		NYC	1870	1870	Dunkirk, Warren and Pittsburgh Railway	
Confluence and Oakland Railroad		B&O	1890	1941	N/A	
Confluence and State Line Railroad		B&O	1889	1890	Confluence and Oakland Railroad	
Connecting Railway		PRR	1863	1976	Consolidated Rail Corporation	
Connection Railroad		NYC	1870	1871	Junction Railroad	
Connellsville Central Railroad		MGA	1902	1905	Connellsville and Monongahela Railway	
Connellsville and Monongahela Railway		MGA	1905		N/A	
Connellsville and State Line Railway		WM	1910	1917	Western Maryland Railway	
Connequenessing Valley Railroad		B&LE	1881	1882	West Penn and Shenango Connecting Railroad	
Consolidated Rail Corporation	CR		1976	1999	CSX Transportation, Norfolk Southern Railway	
Continental Coal Company		DL&W	1860	1865	Keyser Valley Railroad	
Corning, Cowanesque and Antrim Railway		NYC	1873	1892	Fall Brook Railway	
Cornwall Railroad	CWL	RDG	1870	1968	Reading Company	
Cornwall and Lebanon Railroad	C&L	PRR	1882	1918	Pennsylvania Railroad	
Cornwall and Mount Hope Railroad		RDG	1883	1886	Cornwall Railroad	
Corry and State Line Railroad		PRR	1879	1879	Buffalo, Chautauqua Lake and Pittsburgh Railway	
Coudersport and Pine Creek Railroad			1889	1895	Coudersport and Port Allegany Railroad	
Coudersport and Port Allegany Railroad	CPA		1882	1970	N/A	Owned by Wellsville, Addison and Galeton Railroad
Coudersport and Wellsboro Railroad		B&O	1892	1894	Buffalo and Susquehanna Railroad	
Cowanesque Valley Railroad		NYC	1869	1874	Corning, Cowanesque and Antrim Railway	
Crane Railroad		LNE	1905	1914	Lehigh and New England Railroad	
Cresson Railroad		PRR	1891	1891	Cambria and Clearfield Railroad	
Cresson and Clearfield County and New York Short Route Railroad		PRR	1882	1894	Cresson and Irvona Railroad	
Cresson and Irvona Railroad		PRR	1894	1903	Cambria and Clearfield Railway	
Cross Cut Railroad		PRR	1864	1867	Buffalo, Corry and Pittsburgh Railroad	
Cross Fork Railroad		B&O	1893	1893	Buffalo and Susquehanna Railroad	
Cumberland Valley Railroad		PRR	1831	1919	Pennsylvania Railroad	
Cumberland Valley and Waynesboro Railroad		PRR	1901	1906	Cumberland Valley Railroad	
Curwensville and Bower Railroad		NYC	1903	1905	Beech Creek Extension Railroad	
Dahoga and Highland Railroad						
Dallastown Railroad			1898	1902	Maryland and Pennsylvania Railroad	
Danville, Hazleton and Wilkes-Barre Railroad		PRR	1867	1878	Sunbury, Hazleton and Wilkesbarre Railway	
Danville and Pottsville Railroad		PRR	1826	1851	Philadelphia and Sunbury Railroad	
Darlington Cannel Coal Railroad		PLE/ PRR	1852	1855	Pittsburgh, Lisbon and Western Railroad, Pittsburgh, Marion and Chicago Railway	
Dauphin and Susquehanna Coal Company		RDG	1838	1859	Schuylkill and Susquehanna Railroad	
Dawson, Broadford and Mount Pleasant Railroad		PLE	1881	1882	Pittsburgh, McKeesport and Youghiogheny Railroad	
Delaware and Chester County Railroad		B&O	1867	1869	Wilmington and Western Railroad	
Delaware and Cobb's Gap Railroad		DL&W	1849	1853	Delaware, Lackawanna and Western Railroad	
Delaware and Hudson Company		D&H	1899	1930	Delaware and Hudson Railroad	
Delaware and Hudson Railroad	D&H	D&H	1930	1968	Delaware and Hudson Railway	
Delaware and Hudson Canal Company		D&H	1826	1899	Delaware and Hudson Company	
Delaware, Lackawanna and Western Railroad	DL&W, DLW	DL&W	1853	1960	Erie–Lackawanna Railroad	
Delaware, Lehigh, Schuylkill and Susquehanna Railroad		LV	1846	1853	Lehigh Valley Railroad	
Delaware River Railroad and Bridge Company		PRR	1896	1954	Penndel Company	
Delaware River and Lancaster Railroad			1868	1893	N/A	
Delaware River and Union Railroad	DR&U		1902	1941	N/A	Owned by Sunoco
Delaware and Slatington Railroad		LNE	1881	1882	Pennsylvania, Slatington and New England Railroad	
Delaware, Susquehanna and Schuylkill Railroad		LV	1890	1949	Lehigh Valley Railroad	
Delaware Valley Railroad			1899	1903	Delaware Valley Railway	
Delaware Valley Railway	DV		1994	1999	Brandywine Valley Railroad	
Delaware Valley Railway			1904	1937	N/A	
Delaware Valley Railway				1899	Delaware Valley, Hudson and Lehigh Railroad	
Delaware Valley, Hudson and Lehigh Railroad			1898	1899	Delaware Valley Railroad	
Delaware Western Railroad		B&O	1877	1883	Baltimore and Philadelphia Railroad	
Dent's Run Railroad			1903		N/A	
Diamond Valley Railroad			1886	1891	Newport and Shermans Valley Railroad	Founder David Gring relocated and began a new railroad when the DVRR folded.
Dillsburg and Mechanicsburg Railroad		PRR	1871	1906	Cumberland Valley Railroad	
Doe Run and White Clay Creek Railroad		PRR	1868	1870	Pennsylvania and Delaware Railroad	
Donora Southern Railroad	DSO		1902		N/A	
Downingtown and Lancaster Railroad		PRR	1888	1903	Pennsylvania Railroad	
Dunkirk, Allegheny Valley and Pittsburgh Railroad		NYC	1873	1914	New York Central Railroad	
Dunkirk, Warren and Pittsburgh Railway		NYC	1870	1873	Dunkirk, Allegheny Valley and Pittsburgh Railroad	
Eagles Mere Railroad			1891	1922	Eagles Mere Railway	
Eagles Mere Railway			1922	1927	N/A	
East Berlin Railroad	EB		1914	1939	N/A	
East Berlin Railway			1903	1914	East Berlin Railroad	
East Brandywine Railroad		PRR	1854	1860	East Brandywine and Waynesburg Railroad	
East Brandywine and Waynesburg Railroad		PRR	1860	1888	Downingtown and Lancaster Railroad	
East Broad Top Railroad and Coal Company			1856	1956	N/A	Continued as a tourist railroad
East Mahanoy Railroad		RDG	1854	1951	Reading Company	
East Mahanoy and Hazleton Railroad	EMHR		1992	1996	Reading Blue Mountain and Northern Railroad	
East Penn Railways	EPRY		1995	2007	East Penn Railroad	
East Pennsylvania Railroad		RDG	1857	1976	Consolidated Rail Corporation	
East Stroudsburg and Matamoras Railroad				1899	Delaware Valley, Hudson and Lehigh Railroad	
Eastern Railroad			1901	1925	Monongahela Connecting Railroad	
Easton and Northern Railroad		LV	1889	1949	Lehigh Valley Railroad	
Easton and Western Railroad		CNJ	1914	1944	Central Railroad of Pennsylvania	
Ebensburg and Black Lick Railroad		PRR	1893	1903	Cambria and Clearfield Railway	
Ebensburg and Cresson Railroad		PRR	1859	1891	Cresson Railroad	
Eddystone and Delaware River Railroad		PRR	1899	1918	Philadelphia, Baltimore and Washington Railroad	
Elk and Highland Railroad			1898	1913	Elk and Highland Railway	
Elk and Highland Railway			1913	1913	Tionesta Valley Railway	
Elk Lick Coal, Lumber and Iron Company		B&O	1868	1871	Salisbury and Baltimore Railroad and Coal Company	
Ellwood Connecting Railroad		PLE	1892	1911	Beaver and Ellwood Railroad	
Ellwood Short Line Railroad		B&O	1890	1912	Pittsburgh and Western Railroad	
Ellwood Southern Railroad		PLE	1899	1899	Beaver and Ellwood Railroad	
Elmira and Williamsport Railroad		PRR	1860	1969	Penndel Company	
Emlenton and Shippenville Railroad		B&O	1875	1877	Emlenton, Shippenville and Clarion Railway	
Emlenton, Shippenville and Clarion Railway		B&O	1877	1881	Pittsburgh, Bradford and Buffalo Railway	
Emporium and Mount Jewett Railroad		PS&N	1895	1897	Mount Jewett, Clermont and Northern Railroad	
Emporium and Rich Valley Railroad			1891			
Engelside Railroad		PRR	1892	1902	Connecting Railway	
Enterprise Railroad		RDG	1865	1870	Mahanoy and Shamokin Railroad	
Erie Railroad	ERIE	ERIE	1895	1960	Erie–Lackawanna Railroad	
Erie Railway		ERIE	1861	1878	New York, Lake Erie and Western Railroad	
Erie–Lackawanna Railroad	EL		1960	1968	Erie Lackawanna Railway	
Erie Lackawanna Railway	EL		1968	1976	Consolidated Rail Corporation	
Erie and North East Railroad		NYC, PRR	1842	1867	Buffalo and Erie Railroad, Erie and Pittsburgh Railroad	
Erie and Ohio Rail Road		NYC	1849	1854	Cleveland, Painesville and Ashtabula Railroad	Built by the Franklin Canal Company
Erie and Pittsburgh Railroad		PRR	1858	1976	Consolidated Rail Corporation	
Erie, Shenango and Pittsburgh Railway		B&LE	1886	1888	Pittsburgh, Shenango and Lake Erie Railroad	
Erie and State Line Railroad		NKP	1887	1887	New York, Chicago and St. Louis Railroad	
Erie Terminal Railroad		B&LE	1891	1893	Pittsburgh, Shenango and Lake Erie Railroad	
Erie and Wyoming Valley Railroad		ERIE	1882	1941	Erie Railroad	
Eriton Railroad		ERIE	1906	1933	N/A	
Etna and Montrose Railroad			1896	1961	N/A	
Fair Hill Railroad		PRR	1892	1902	Connecting Railway	
Fairmont, Morgantown and Pittsburg Railroad		B&O	1893	1989	CSX Transportation	
Fall Brook Railway		NYC	1892	1909	Geneva, Corning and Southern Railroad	
Falls Creek Railroad			1889	1897	Reynoldsville and Falls Creek Railroad	
Farmers' Railroad		PRR	1862	1868	Warren and Franklin Railway	
Fayette County Railroad		B&O	1857	1912	Baltimore and Ohio Railroad in Pennsylvania	
Forest City and State Line Railroad		O&W	1889	1889	Ontario, Carbondale and Scranton Railway	
Foxburg, Kane and Bradford Railroad		B&O	1879	1881	Pittsburgh, Bradford and Buffalo Railway	
Foxburg, St. Petersburg and Clarion Railroad		B&O	1877	1881	Pittsburgh, Bradford and Buffalo Railway	
Frankford Creek Railroad		PRR	1890	1891	Kensington and Tacony Railroad	
Frankford and Holmesburg Railroad		PRR	1863	1890	Bustleton Railroad	
Franklin Railroad		PRR	1859	1865	Cumberland Valley Railroad	
Franklin Railroad		PRR	1832	1850	Chambersburg, Greencastle and Hagerstown Railroad	
Franklin Canal Company		NYC	1849	1854	Cleveland, Painesville and Ashtabula Railroad	
Franklin and Clearfield Railroad		NYC	1902	1909	Jamestown, Franklin and Clearfield Railroad	
Gaffney and James City Railroad		B&O	1913	1940	N/A	
Gaines and State Line Railroad		PRR	1875	1876	Geneva, Hornellsville and Pine Creek Railway	
Galeton and Eastern Railroad		B&O	1898	1901	Buffalo and Susquehanna Railroad	
Galeton, South Branch and Germania Railroad						
Garfield and Cherry Grove Railroad			1882	1884	Cherry Grove Railroad	
Geneva, Corning and Southern Railroad		NYC	1909	1914	New York Central Railroad	
Geneva, Hornellsville and Pine Creek Railway		PRR	1876	1879	Lake Ontario Southern Railway	
Gettysburg Railroad (1976-1996)	GETY		1976	1996	Gettysburg Railway	
Gettysburg Railroad		WM	1853	1870	Susquehanna, Gettysburg and Potomac Railway	
Gettysburg Railway	GBRY		1996	2001	Gettysburg and Northern Railroad	
Gettysburg and Harrisburg Railroad		RDG	1882	1891	Gettysburg and Harrisburg Railway	
Gettysburg and Harrisburg Railway		RDG	1891	1945	Reading Company	
Girardville Railroad		PRR	1892	1893	Pennsylvania Schuylkill Valley Railroad	
Glen Hazel and Shawmut Railroad				1893	Ketner, St. Mary's and Shawmut Railroad	
Glenwood Railroad		B&O	1896	1912	Baltimore and Ohio Railroad in Pennsylvania	
Good Spring Railroad		RDG	1863	1871	Lebanon and Tremont Railroad	
Grassy Island Railroad		ERIE	1887	1936	Moosic Mountain and Carbondale Railroad	
Grays Run Railway		LV	1903	1903	Susquehanna and New York Railroad	
Greenlick Railway			1892		N/A	
Greenlick Narrow Gauge Railway			1874	1892	Greenlick Railway	
Hanover Branch Railroad		WM	1849	1874	Hanover Junction, Hanover and Gettysburg Railroad	
Hanover Junction, Hanover and Gettysburg Railroad		WM	1874	1886	Baltimore and Harrisburg Railway	
Hanover Junction and Susquehanna Railroad		RDG	1876	1881	Reading, Marietta and Hanover Railroad	
Hanover and Newport Railroad		DL&W	1894	1909	Delaware, Lackawanna and Western Railroad	
Hanover and York Railroad		PRR	1873	1897	York, Hanover and Frederick Railroad	
Harrisburg, Portsmouth, Mountjoy and Lancaster Railroad		PRR	1835	1917	Pennsylvania Railroad	
Harrisburg and Potomac Railroad		RDG	1871	1890	Harrisburg and Shippensburg Railroad	
Harrisburg and Shippensburg Railroad		RDG	1890	1890	Philadelphia, Harrisburg and Pittsburgh Railroad	
Harrisburg Terminal Railroad		RDG	1889	1890	Philadelphia, Harrisburg and Pittsburgh Railroad	
Hazleton Railroad		LV	1865	1868	Lehigh Valley Railroad	
Hazleton Coal Company		LV	1836	1865	Hazleton Railroad	
Hempfield Railroad		B&O	1850	1871	Wheeling, Pittsburgh and Baltimore Railroad	
Hickory Valley Railroad			1887	1938	N/A	
Hicks Run Railroad			1905			
Hollidaysburg, Bedford and Cumberland Railroad		PRR	1911	1914	Pennsylvania Railroad	
Hooverhurst and South Western Railroad		NYC	1902	1913	Beech Creek Extension Railroad	
Howard Coal and Iron Company		D&H	1864	1867	Union Coal Company	
Hunter's Run and Slate Belt Railroad		RDG	1891	1910	Gettysburg and Harrisburg Railway	
Huntingdon and Broad Top Mountain Railroad and Coal Company	H&BT		1852	1954	Everett Railroad, Pennsylvania Railroad	
Indian Creek Valley Railway		B&O	1902	1972	N/A	
Ironton Railroad	IRN	LV/ RDG	1859	1976	Consolidated Rail Corporation	
ISS Rail, Inc.	ISSR		1993		New Castle Industrial Railroad	
Jackson Coal Railroad		NYC	1883	1909	Jamestown, Franklin and Clearfield Railroad	
Jamestown and Franklin Railroad		NYC	1862	1909	Jamestown, Franklin and Clearfield Railroad	
Jamestown, Franklin and Clearfield Railroad		NYC	1909	1915	New York Central Railroad	
Jeddo and Carbon County Railroad		LV	1854	1856	Lehigh and Luzerne Railroad	
Jefferson Railroad		ERIE	1851	1941	Erie Railroad	
Jefferson and Allegheny Railway		B&O	1894	1898	Allegheny and Western Railway	
Jersey Shore and Antes Fort Railroad			1904			
Jersey Shore, Pine Creek and Buffalo Railway		NYC	1870	1884	Pine Creek Railway	
Johnsonburg Railroad		PRR	1887	1928	Pennsylvania Railroad	
Johnsonburgh Railroad		B&O	1887	1888	Johnsonburgh and Bradford Railroad	
Johnsonburgh and Bradford Railroad		B&O	1888	1907	Buffalo, Rochester and Pittsburgh Railway	
Johnsonburg, Kane, Warren and Irvine Railroad	JKWI		1982	1985	Allegheny Railroad	
Johnstown and Stony Creek Railroad	J&SC, JSC		1888	1983	N/A	
Jones Lake Railroad		ERIE	1887	1894	Erie and Wyoming Valley Railroad	
Junction Railroad		PRR	1860	1908	Pennsylvania Railroad	
Junction Railroad		NYC	1870	1871	Jamestown and Franklin Railroad	
Juniata and Southern Railroad			1913	1917	N/A	
Kane Railroad			1899	1931	N/A	Operated by Mount Jewett, Kinzua and Riterville Railroad
Kane and Elk Railroad			1895	1946	N/A	
Karns City and Butler Railroad		B&O	1873	1881	Pittsburgh and Western Railroad	
Keating and Smethport Railroad			1899	1931	N/A	Operated by Mount Jewett, Kinzua and Riterville Railroad
Kendall and Eldred Railroad			1877	1893	N/A	Operated by Western New York and Pennsylvania Railroad
Kensington and Tacony Railroad		PRR	1884	1902	Connecting Railway	
Kersey Railroad		PS&N	1900	1947	N/A	
Ketner, Elbon and Shawmut Railroad			1892	1893	Ketner, St. Mary's and Shawmut Railroad	
Ketner and Kay Fork Railway			1901			
Ketner, St. Mary's and Shawmut Railroad			1893			
Keyser Valley Railroad		DL&W	1865	1865	Delaware, Lackawanna and Western Railroad	
Kinzua Railroad		PRR	1911	1911	Western New York and Pennsylvania Railway	
Kinzua Railway		PRR	1881	1911	Kinzua Railroad	
Kinzua Hemlock Railroad			1890	1936	N/A	Operated by Valley Railroad
Kinzua and Tiona Railroad			1897			
Kinzua Valley Railroad		PRR	1889	1911	Kinzua Railroad	
Kishacoquillas Valley Railroad			1892	1940	N/A	
Kittanning Run Railroad			1905			
Knox and Kane Railroad	KKRR		1982	2006	N/A	
Kushequa Railroad		B&O	1898	1931	Mount Jewett, Kinzua and Riterville Railroad	
Lackawanna Railway	LRWY		1991	1993	Delaware–Lackawanna Railroad	
Lackawanna and Bloomsburg Railroad		DL&W	1852	1873	Delaware, Lackawanna and Western Railroad	
Lackawanna and Montrose Railroad		DL&W	1889	1928	Delaware, Lackawanna and Western Railroad	
Lackawanna Valley Railroad	LVAL		1985	1993	Delaware–Lackawanna Railroad	
Lackawanna and Western Railroad		DL&W	1851	1853	Delaware, Lackawanna and Western Railroad	
Lackawanna and Wyoming Valley Railroad	L&WV	DL&W	1901	1960	Lackawanna and Wyoming Valley Railway	Electric until 1953
Lackawanna and Wyoming Valley Railway	L&WV, LWV	DL&W	1959	1976	Consolidated Rail Corporation	
Lackawaxen and Stourbridge Railroad	LASB		1976	1989	Stourbridge Railroad	
Lake Erie, Franklin and Clarion Railroad	LEF		1913	1992	N/A	
Lake Ontario Southern Railway		PRR	1879	1882	Sodus Bay and Southern Railway (NY)	Sold at foreclosure; no property in Pennsylvania
Lake Shore Railway		NYC	1868	1869	Lake Shore and Michigan Southern Railway	
Lake Shore and Michigan Southern Railway		NYC	1869	1914	New York Central Railroad	
Lancaster and Northern Railroad			1906			Never operated revenue service.
Lancaster Northern Railway	LANO		1995	1997	Penn Eastern Rail Lines	
Lancaster, Oxford and Southern Railroad			1890	1912	Lancaster, Oxford and Southern Railway	
Lancaster, Oxford and Southern Railway			1912	1918	N/A	
Lancaster and Quarryville Railroad		PRR	1904	1915	Pennsylvania Railroad	
Lancaster and Reading Narrow Gauge Railroad		PRR	1871	1904	Lancaster and Quarryville Railroad	
Latrobe and Ligonier Railroad			1853	1871	Ligonier Valley Railroad	
Lawrence Railroad		PRR	1865	1887	Youngstown, Lawrence and Pittsburgh Railroad	
Lawrence Railroad and Transportation Company		PRR	1864	1865	Lawrence Railroad	
Lebanon Belt Railway		PRR	1889	1891	Cornwall and Lebanon Railroad	
Lebanon and Tremont Railroad		RDG	1871	1871	Philadelphia and Reading Railroad	
Lebanon Valley Railroad		RDG	1850	1858	Philadelphia and Reading Railroad	
Leetonia Railway			1899			
Lehigh and Delaware Railroad		LNE	1904	1904	Lehigh and New England Railroad	
Lehigh and Delaware Gap Railroad		CNJ	1857	1867	Lehigh Coal and Navigation Company	
Lehigh and Hudson River Railway	L&HR, LHR		1889	1976	Consolidated Rail Corporation	
Lehigh and Lackawanna Railroad		LNE	1864	1904	Lehigh and Delaware Railroad	
Lehigh Luzerne Railroad		LV	1857	1868	Lehigh Valley Railroad	
Lehigh and Luzerne Railroad		LV	1856	1857	Lehigh Luzerne Railroad	
Lehigh and Mahanoy Railroad		LV	1862	1866	Lehigh Valley Railroad	
Lehigh and New England Railroad	LNE	LNE	1895	1961	Lehigh and New England Railway	
Lehigh and New England Railway	LNE	CNJ	1961	1976	Consolidated Rail Corporation	
Lehigh Coal and Navigation Company		CNJ	1837	1978	Consolidated Rail Corporation	
Lehigh Valley Railroad	LV	LV	1853	1976	Consolidated Rail Corporation	
Lewisburg and Buffalo Valley Railroad			1897	1906	N/A	
Lewisburg, Centre and Spruce Creek Railroad		PRR	1853	1879	Lewisburg and Tyrone Railroad	
Lewisburg and Tyrone Railroad		PRR	1880	1913	Lewisburg and Tyrone Railway	
Lewisburg and Tyrone Railway		PRR	1913	1915	Pennsylvania Railroad	
Liggett's Gap Railroad		DL&W	1832	1851	Lackawanna and Western Railroad	
Ligonier Valley Railroad	LGV		1871	1952	N/A	
Little Saw Mill Run Railroad		P&WV	1850	1897	West Side Belt Railroad	
Little Schuylkill Navigation, Railroad and Coal Company		RDG	1829	1952	Reading Company	
Little Schuylkill and Susquehanna Railroad		RDG	1835	1849	Catawissa, Williamsport and Erie Railroad	
Littlestown Railroad		PRR	1854	1892	Hanover and York Railroad	
Locust Gap Improvement Company		RDG	1854	1864	Philadelphia and Reading Railroad	
Lorberry Creek Railroad		RDG	1843	1871	Lebanon and Tremont Railroad	
Loyalhanna and Youghiogheny Railroad		NYC	1894	1895	Pittsburgh and Eastern Railroad	
Loyalsock Railroad		LV	1884	1949	Lehigh Valley Railroad	
Lykens Valley Railroad and Coal Company		PRR	1830	1956	Penndel Company	
Mahanoy and Broad Mountain Railroad		RDG	1860	1870	Mahanoy and Shamokin Railroad	
Mahanoy and Shamokin Improvement Company		RDG	1850	1856	Trevorton Coal and Railroad Company	
Mahanoy and Shamokin Railroad		RDG	1870	1871	Philadelphia and Reading Railroad	
Mahanoy Valley Railroad		RDG	1868	1870	Mahanoy and Shamokin Railroad	
Mahoning and Shenango Valley Railway		NYC	1963	1976	Consolidated Rail Corporation	
Mahoning State Line Railroad		PLE	1894			Still exists as a nonoperating subsidiary of CSX Transportation
Mahoning Valley Railroad		B&O	1890	1967	Buffalo, Rochester and Pittsburgh Railway	
Main Line of Public Works		PRR	1828	1857	Pennsylvania Railroad	
Manns Choice and Hyndman Railroad		PRR	1894	1894	Pennsylvania Midland Railroad	
Manufacturers Railroad		RDG	1870	1873	Philadelphia and Reading Railroad	
Manufacturers Terminal Railway						
Mapleton and Rocky Ridge Railway			1891			
Marginal Railroad			1880	1890	Pennsylvania Company	
Martins Creek Railroad		PRR	1885	1896	Belvidere Delaware Railroad	
Maryland Central Railway			1888	1891	Baltimore and Lehigh Railroad	
Maryland and Pennsylvania Railroad	M&PA, MPA		1901			Still exists as a nonoperating subsidiary of the York Railway
Masontown and New Salem Railroad		MGA	1899	1905	Connellsville and Monongahela Railway	
Mauch Chunk Railroad			1826	1872	Continued as a tourist railroad	
McKean and Buffalo Railroad		PRR	1874	1911	Western New York and Pennsylvania Railway	
McKees Rocks Railroad			1899	1899	Pittsburgh, Allegheny and McKees Rocks Railroad	
McKeesport and Belle Vernon Railroad		PLE	1886	1890	Pittsburgh, McKeesport and Youghiogheny Railroad	
McKeesport and Bessemer Railroad		PRR	1888	1894	Pittsburgh, Virginia and Charleston Railway	
McKeesport Terminal Railroad			1896			
McLaughlin Line Railroad	MCLR		1985		N/A	
McLaughlin's and Saw Mill Run Railway		PLE/ PRR	1881	1881	Pittsburgh, Chartiers and Youghiogheny Railway	
Mead Run Railroad			1897	1931	N/A	Operated by Mount Jewett, Kinzua and Riterville Railroad
Meadow Lands and Zediker Railroad		PRR	1903	1907	Chartiers Railway	
Meadville Railroad		ERIE	1857	1858	Atlantic and Great Western Railroad	
Meadville Railway		B&LE	1880	1884	Meadville and Linesville Railway	
Meadville, Conneaut Lake and Linesville Railroad		B&LE	1891	1948	Bessemer and Lake Erie Railroad	
Meadville and Linesville Railway		B&LE	1884	1891	Meadville, Conneaut Lake and Linesville Railroad	
Medix Run Railroad		B&O	1886	1905	Susquehanna and Southern Railroad	
Mercer Valley Railroad			1900			
Mercersburg Railway	MERW		1978	1980	Consolidated Rail Corporation	
Middle Creek Railroad		PRR	1865	1870	Sunbury and Lewistown Railroad	
Middletown and Hummelstown Railroad		RDG	1888	1923	Reading Company	
Midland Pennsylvania Railroad			1910			
Midland Terminal Company	MDLR		1983	2003	Pennsylvania Southwestern Railroad	
Midway and Oakdale Railway		PRR	1900	1909	Pittsburgh, Cincinnati, Chicago and St. Louis Railway	
Mifflin and Centre County Railroad		PRR	1860	1896	Sunbury and Lewistown Railroad	
Mill Creek Railroad		PRR	1865	1865	Reno, Oil Creek and Pithole Railway	
Mill Creek and Mine Hill Navigation and Railroad Company		RDG	1828	1950	Reading Company	
Mill Creek Valley Railroad		PS&N	1899	1899	Pittsburg, Shawmut and Northern Railroad	
Millersburg Railroad		PRR	1899	1903	Cambria and Clearfield Railway	
Millville and North Mountain Railroad		PRR	1886	1887	Wilkesbarre and Western Railway	
Milton and North Mountain Railroad		PRR	1885	1887	Wilkesbarre and Western Railway	
Mine Hill and Schuylkill Haven Railroad		RDG	1829	1951	Reading Company	
Mineral Railroad and Mining Company			1865			
Miramar Iron Company		RDG	1870	1871	Harrisburg and Potomac Railroad	
Mocanaqua and Eastern Railroad						
Monessen Southwestern Railway			1912			
Monongahela Railroad		MGA	1900	1915	Monongahela Railway	
Monongahela Railway	MGA	MGA	1915	1993	Consolidated Rail Corporation	
Monongahela Connecting Railroad	MGAC, MCRR		1885	2002	Allegheny Valley Railroad	
Monongahela and Ohio Railroad		MGA	1912	1933	Monongahela Railway	
Monongahela River and Streets Run Railroad		PRR	1892	1894	Pittsburgh, Virginia and Charleston Railway	
Monongahela Southern Railroad			1897	1937	Union Railroad	
Monongahela Valley Railroad		PRR	1867	1870	Pittsburgh, Virginia and Charleston Railway	
Monongahela and Washington Railroad		PRR	1899	1904	Pennsylvania Railroad	
Mont Alto Railroad		PRR	1871	1901	Cumberland Valley and Waynesboro Railroad	
Montour Railroad	M, MTR	MTR	1877	1983	N/A	
Montrose Railroad		LV	1905	1949	Lehigh Valley Railroad	
Montrose Railway		LV	1869	1905	Montrose Railroad	
Moosic Mountain and Carbondale Railroad		ERIE	1887	1941	Erie Railroad	
Morgantown and Wheeling Railway	M&W	MGA	1917	1923	Scotts Run Railway	
Moshannon Railroad		PRR	1863	1881	Bald Eagle Valley Railroad	
Moshannon and Clearfield Railroad		PRR	1880	1884	Tyrone and Clearfield Railway	
Mount Carmel Railroad		RDG	1907	1952	N/A	
Mount Carmel and Natalie Railroad		RDG	1891	1906	Mount Carmel Railroad	
Mount Carbon Railroad		RDG	1829	1872	Philadelphia and Reading Railroad	
Mount Carbon and Port Carbon Railroad		RDG	1842	1949	Reading Company	
Mount Eagle and Tremont Railroad		RDG	1853	1862	Mine Hill and Schuylkill Haven Railroad	
Mount Jewett, Clermont and Northern Railroad		PS&N	1897	1899	Pittsburg, Shawmut and Northern Railroad	
Mount Jewett, Kinzua and Riterville Railroad		B&O	1889	1942	N/A	
Mount Jewett and Smethport Railroad		PS&N	1892	1897	Mount Jewett, Clermont and Northern Railroad	
Mount Penn Gravity Railroad			1889			
Mount Pleasant and Broad Ford Railroad		B&O	1870	1912	Baltimore and Ohio Railroad in Pennsylvania	
Mount Pleasant and Latrobe Railroad			1881			
Mountain Laurel Railroad	MNL		1991	1996	Pittsburg and Shawmut Railroad	
Muncy Creek Railway			1864	1882	Williamsport and North Branch Railroad	
Nanticoke Railroad		CNJ	1860	1867	Lehigh Coal and Navigation Company	
Nazareth and Lehigh Railway		DL&W	1899	1899	Bangor and Portland Railway	
Nescopec Railroad		PRR	1886	1900	Schuylkill and Juniata Railroad	
Nesquehoning Valley Railroad		CNJ	1861	1963	Lehigh Coal and Navigation Company	
New Berlin and Winfield Railroad			1904	1916	N/A	
New Brighton and New Castle Railroad		PRR	1881	1887	Youngstown, Lawrence and Pittsburgh Railroad	
New Castle and Beaver Valley Railroad		PRR	1862	1906	Pittsburgh, Youngstown and Ashtabula Railway	
New Castle and Butler Railroad			1881			
New Castle and Darlington Railroad		PRR	1856	1857	Pittsburgh, New Castle and Cleveland Railroad	
New Castle and Franklin Railroad		PRR	1864	1881	New Castle and Oil City Railroad	
New Castle and Oil City Railroad		PRR	1881	1882	Oil City and Chicago Railroad	
New Castle, Plain Grove and Butler Railroad			1882	1882	Oil City and Chicago Railroad	
New Castle Northern Railway		ERIE	1883	1887	New Castle and Shenango Valley Railroad	
New Castle and Shenango Valley Railroad		ERIE	1887	1900	Sharon Railway	
New Haven and Dunbar Railroad			1892	1955	N/A	
New Park and Fawn Grove Railroad			1905	1935	N/A	Operated by Stewartstown Railroad
New York Central Railroad	NYC	NYC	1914	1968	Penn Central Transportation Company	
New York Central and Hudson River Railroad		NYC	1890	1914	New York Central Railroad	
New York, Chicago and St. Louis Railroad	NKP	NKP	1887	1964	Norfolk and Western Railway	
New York, Chicago and St. Louis Railway		NKP	1881	1887	Erie and State Line Railroad	
New York and Erie Railroad		ERIE	1841	1861	Erie Railway	
New York, Lackawanna and Western Railway		DL&W	1880	1945	Delaware, Lackawanna and Western Railroad	
New York, Lake Erie and Western Railroad		ERIE	1878	1895	Erie Railroad	
New York, Lake Erie and Western Coal and Railroad Company		ERIE	1881	1941	Erie Railroad	
New York and North Pennsylvania Railroad		B&O	1883	1898	Galeton and Eastern Railroad	
New York, Ontario and Western Railway	O&W, OW	O&W	1890	1957	N/A	
New York and Pennsylvania Railroad			1896	1902	New York and Pennsylvania Railway	
New York and Pennsylvania Railway			1904	1935	N/A	
New York, Pennsylvania and Ohio Railroad		ERIE	1880	1896	Nypano Railroad	
New York and Pittsburgh Air Line Railroad			1906	1907	Philipsburg Railroad	
New York and Pittsburg Central Railroad			1903	1906	N/A	Leased the Altoona and Philipsburg Connecting Railroad
New York, Pittsburgh and Chicago Railway		PLE/ PRR	1881	1885	Wampum and State Line Railway	
New York Short Line Railroad		RDG	1903	1923	Reading Company	
New York, Susquehanna and Western Railroad	S&W, NYSW	ERIE	1881	1958	N/A	
Newport and Shermans Valley Railroad			1890	1920	Susquehanna River and Western Railroad	
Nicholson Run and Pine Swamp Railroad and Coal Company		PRR	1853	1856	New Castle and Darlington Railroad	
Nittany Valley Railroad			1887	1914	N/A	
Nittany Valley and Southwestern Railroad			1882	1882	Buffalo Run, Bellefonte and Bald Eagle Railroad	
Norfolk and Western Railway	N&W, NW		1964	1998	Norfolk Southern Railway	
Norristown and Allentown Railroad		RDG	1854	1865	Perkiomen Railroad	
Norristown and Freemansburg Railroad		RDG	1852	1854	Norristown and Allentown Railroad	
Norristown Junction Railroad		RDG	1879	1923	Reading Company	
Norristown and Main Line Connecting Railroad		RDG	1901	1923	Reading Company	
Norristown and Valley Railroad		RDG	1835	1850	Chester Valley Railroad	
North Bend and Kettle Creek Railroad			1893			
North Fayette Railroad		MTR	1879	1879	Montour Railroad	
North Lebanon Railroad		RDG	1850	1870	Cornwall Railroad	
North Pennsylvania Railroad		RDG	1853	1976	Consolidated Rail Corporation	
North Shore Railroad			1908			
North Shore Terminal Railroad			1898	1899	Pittsburgh, Allegheny and McKees Rocks Railroad	
North Star and Mifflin Railroad		MTR	1912	1913	Montour Railroad	
North and West Branch Railroad		PRR	1871	1881	North and West Branch Railway	
North and West Branch Railway		PRR	1881	1900	Schuylkill and Juniata Railroad	
Northampton Railroad		LNE	1901	1903	Lehigh and New England Railroad	
Northampton and Bath Railroad	NB		1902	1979	N/A	
North East Pennsylvania Railroad		RDG	1870	1945	Reading Company	
Northern Central Railway		PRR	1854	1976	Consolidated Rail Corporation	
Northern Coal and Iron Company		D&H	1864			
Northern Liberties Railway			1896			
Northern Liberties and Penn Township Railroad		RDG	1829	1871	Philadelphia and Reading Railroad	
Northern Railroad and Navigation Company			1867	1873	Rochester, Nunda and Pennsylvania Railroad	
Northern Susquehanna Railroad		B&O	1900	1901	Buffalo and Susquehanna Railroad	
North Western Railroad		PRR	1853	1859	Western Pennsylvania Railroad	
North Western Coal and Iron Company		DL&W	1856	1856	Buffalo Coal and Iron Company	
Northwestern Pennsylvania Railway		PRR	1895	1895	Western New York and Pennsylvania Railway	
Northumberland County Railway Company						
Nypano Railroad		ERIE	1896	1941	Erie Railroad	
Octoraro Railroad	OCTR		2003	2004	East Penn Railways	
Octoraro Railway	OCTR		1977	1994	Delaware Valley Railway	
Ohio and Baltimore Short Line Railway		B&O	1873	1912	Baltimore and Ohio Railroad in Pennsylvania	
Ohio Connecting Railway		PRR	1886	1954	Penndel Company	
Ohio and Pennsylvania Railroad	OHPA		2004	2006	Eastern States Railroad	
Ohio and Pennsylvania Railroad	OHPA		1995	1996	Central Columbiana and Pennsylvania Railway	
Ohio and Pennsylvania Railroad		PRR	1848	1856	Pittsburgh, Fort Wayne and Chicago Railroad	
Ohio River Junction Railroad			1908	1908	North Shore Railroad	
Ohio River and Lake Erie Railroad		B&LE	1881	1886	Erie, Shenango and Pittsburgh Railway	
Oil City and Chicago Railroad		PRR	1882	1882	Buffalo, New York and Philadelphia Railroad	
Oil City and Ridgway Railroad		PRR	1870	1881	Buffalo, Pittsburgh and Western Railroad	
Oil Creek Railroad		PRR	1860	1868	Oil Creek and Allegheny River Railway	
Oil Creek and Allegheny River Railway		PRR	1868	1875	Pittsburgh, Titusville and Buffalo Railway	
Oil Creek Junction Railroad		NYC	1870	1871	Junction Railroad	
Oil Creek and Titusville Mining and Transportation Company		PRR	1865	1866	Union and Titusville Railroad	
Olean, Bradford and Warren Railway		PRR	1877	1911	Bradford Railroad	
Olean, Oswayo and Eastern Railroad			1892	1896	New York and Pennsylvania Railroad	
Oleona Railroad			1901			
Oleona and Germania Railroad			1902			
Ontario, Carbondale and Scranton Railway		O&W	1889	1957	N/A	
Orangeville and Lehigh Railroad		PRR	1892	1893	Central Pennsylvania and Western Railroad	
Oswayo Valley Railroad			1918	1920	New York and Pennsylvania Railway	
Pan Handle Railway		PRR	1861	1868	Pittsburgh, Cincinnati and St. Louis Railway	
Panther Creek Railroad		LNE	1913	1913	Lehigh and New England Railroad	
Panther Valley Railroad	PVAL		1983	1990	C&S Railroad	
Parker and Karns City Railroad		B&O	1873	1881	Pittsburgh and Western Railroad	
Path Valley Railroad			1893	1900	Perry Lumber Company	
Peach Bottom Railroad			1881	1890	Lancaster, Oxford and Southern Railroad	
Peach Bottom Railway			1868	1881	Peach Bottom Railroad, York and Peach Bottom Railway	
Pencoyd and Philadelphia Railroad			1899	1929	N/A	Owned by the American Bridge Company
Penn Central Transportation Company	PC		1968	1976	Consolidated Rail Corporation	
Penn Eastern Rail Lines	PRL		1997	2007	East Penn Railroad	
Penn Jersey Rail Lines	PJRL		1997	2002	SMS Rail Service, Inc.	
Penn Haven and White Haven Railroad		LV	1857	1864	Lehigh Valley Railroad	
Penndel Company		PRR	1954	1976	Consolidated Rail Corporation	
Pennsylvania Company		PRR	1871	1918	Pennsylvania Railroad	
Pennsylvania Railroad	PRR	PRR	1846	1968	Penn Central Transportation Company	
Pennsylvania and Delaware Railroad		PRR	1870	1873	Pennsylvania and Delaware Railway	
Pennsylvania and Delaware Railway		PRR	1873	1879	Pomeroy and State Line Railroad	
Pennsylvania Midland Railroad		PRR	1894	1902	Bedford and Hollidaysburg Railroad	
Pennsylvania Midland Railway		ERIE	1881	1881	New York, Susquehanna and Western Railroad	
Pennsylvania, Monongahela and Southern Railroad		PRR	1902	1915	Pennsylvania Railroad	
Pennsylvania and New Jersey Railroad		PRR	1894	1896	Delaware River Railroad and Bridge Company	
Pennsylvania and New York Canal and Railroad Company		LV	1865	1949	Lehigh Valley Railroad	
Pennsylvania Northern Railroad			1911	1913	Lake Erie, Franklin and Clarion Railroad	
Pennsylvania and North Western Railroad		PRR	1889	1903	Cambria and Clearfield Railway	
Pennsylvania, Poughkeepsie and Boston Railroad		LNE	1887	1895	Lehigh and New England Railroad	
Pennsylvania Schuylkill Valley Railroad		PRR	1883	1900	Schuylkill and Juniata Railroad	
Pennsylvania, Slatington and New England Railroad		LNE	1882	1887	Pennsylvania, Poughkeepsie and Boston Railroad	
Pennsylvania Southern Railroad			1910	1913	Lake Erie, Franklin and Clarion Railroad	
Pennsylvania and West Virginia Railroad		PRR	1889	1893	Bedford and Blair County Railroad	
Pennsylvania Western and Ohio River Connecting Railway			1901			
Pequea Railroad and Improvement Company		RDG	1849	1851	Dauphin and Susquehanna Coal Company	
Perkiomen Railroad		RDG	1865	1945	Reading Company	
Perry County Railroad			1887	1903	Susquehanna River and Western Railroad	
Perry Lumber Company Railroad			1901	1905		
Philadelphia and Baltimore Central Railroad		PRR	1853	1916	Philadelphia, Baltimore and Washington Railroad	
Philadelphia and Columbia Railroad		PRR	1834	1857	Pennsylvania Railroad	
Philadelphia, Baltimore and Washington Railroad		PRR	1902	1976	Consolidated Rail Corporation	
Philadelphia, Bethlehem and New England Railroad	PBNE		1910	2003	Lehigh Valley Rail Management	Owned by Bethlehem Steel
Philadelphia and Bustleton Railway		PRR	1892	1893	Philadelphia, Bustleton and Trenton Railroad	
Philadelphia, Bustleton and Trenton Railroad		PRR	1893	1902	Connecting Railway	
Philadelphia and Chester County Railroad		PRR	1872	1885	Philadelphia Midland Railroad	
Philadelphia and Chester Valley Railroad		RDG	1888	1945	Reading Company	
Philadelphia, Delaware and Chester Central Railroad		PRR	1871	1872	Philadelphia and Chester County Railroad	
Philadelphia and Delaware County Railroad		PRR	1890	1913	Philadelphia and Baltimore Central Railroad	
Philadelphia and Delaware County Railroad		PRR	1831	1836	Philadelphia, Wilmington and Baltimore Railroad	
Philadelphia, Easton and Water Gap Railroad		RDG	1852	1853	North Pennsylvania Railroad	
Philadelphia and Erie Railroad		PRR	1861	1907	Pennsylvania Railroad	
Philadelphia and Frankford Railroad		RDG	1892	1923	Reading Company	
Philadelphia, Germantown and Chestnut Hill Railroad		PRR	1883	1902	Connecting Railway	
Philadelphia, Germantown and Norristown Railroad		RDG	1831	1976	Consolidated Rail Corporation	
Philadelphia, Harrisburg and Pittsburgh Railroad		RDG	1890	1923	Reading Company	
Philadelphia Midland Railroad		PRR	1885	1890	Philadelphia and Delaware County Railroad	
Philadelphia and Montgomery County Railroad		RDG	1860	1872	Philadelphia and Newtown Railroad	
Philadelphia and Newtown Railroad		RDG	1872	1873	Philadelphia, Newtown and New York Railroad	
Philadelphia and Newtown Connecting Railroad		RDG	1892	1892	Philadelphia, Newtown and New York Railroad	
Philadelphia, Newtown and New York Railroad		RDG	1873	1945	Reading Company	
Philadelphia, Newtown Square and Chester Railroad		B&O	1886	1886	Schuylkill River East Side Railroad	
Philadelphia, Norristown and Phoenixville Railroad		PRR	1882	1883	Pennsylvania Schuylkill Valley Railroad	
Philadelphia and Pittsburgh Railroad		NYC	1893	1895	Pittsburgh and Eastern Railroad	
Philadelphia and Reading Railroad		RDG	1833	1896	Philadelphia and Reading Railway	
Philadelphia and Reading Railway	P&R	RDG	1896	1924	Reading Company	
Philadelphia and Reading Terminal Railroad		RDG	1888	1944	Reading Company	
Philadelphia and Sunbury Railroad		PRR	1851	1858	Shamokin Valley and Pottsville Railroad	
Philadelphia and Trenton Railroad		PRR	1832	1976	Consolidated Rail Corporation	
Philadelphia, Wilmington and Baltimore Railroad		PRR	1836	1902	Philadelphia, Baltimore and Washington Railroad	
Philipsburg Railroad			1907	1909	Philipsburg and Susquehanna Valley Railroad	
Philipsburg Coal, Iron and Oil Company		PRR	1865	1867	Tyrone and Clearfield Railway	
Philipsburg and Susquehanna Valley Railroad			1909	1910	Pittsburgh and Susquehanna Railroad	
Phoenixville, Pottstown and Reading Railroad		PRR	1882	1883	Pennsylvania Schuylkill Valley Railroad	
Phoenixville and West Chester Railroad		PRR	1882	1883	Pennsylvania Schuylkill Valley Railroad	
Pickering Valley Railroad		RDG	1869	1948	Reading Company	
Pine Creek Railway		NYC	1884	1909	Geneva, Corning and Southern Railroad	
Pine Grove and Lebanon Railroad		RDG	1868	1871	Lebanon and Tremont Railroad	
Pine Run Railroad		PRR	1906	1912	Cambria and Clearfield Railway	
Pittsburgh Railroad		B&O	1879	1879	Pittsburgh Southern Railway	
Pittsburgh and Allegheny Railroad			1899	1899	Pittsburgh, Allegheny and McKees Rocks Railroad	
Pittsburgh and Allegheny River Railroad			1898			
Pittsburgh and Beck's Run Railroad		PLE	1877	1880	Pittsburgh and Lake Erie Railroad	
Pittsburg, Bessemer and Lake Erie Railroad		B&LE	1897	1948	Bessemer and Lake Erie Railroad	
Pittsburgh, Bradford and Buffalo Railway		B&O	1881	1883	Pittsburgh and Western Railroad	
Pittsburgh, Butler and Shenango Railroad		B&LE	1889	1890	Pittsburgh, Shenango and Lake Erie Railroad	
Pittsburgh and Carnegie Railroad		P&WV	1901	1901	Pittsburgh, Carnegie and Western Railroad	
Pittsburgh, Carnegie and Western Railroad		P&WV	1901	1904	Wabash Pittsburgh Terminal Railway	
Pittsburgh and Castle Shannon Railroad			1871	1909	N/A	
Pittsburgh, Castle Shannon and Washington Railroad		B&O	1877	1878	Pittsburgh Southern Railroad	
Pittsburgh, Chartiers and Youghiogheny Railway	PCY	PLE/ PRR	1881	1996	Pittsburgh Industrial Railroad	
Pittsburgh and Chicago Railway		B&O, PLE/ PRR	1878	1881	New York, Pittsburgh and Chicago Railway, Pittsburgh and Western Railroad	
Pittsburgh, Cincinnati and St. Louis Railway		PRR	1868	1890	Pittsburgh, Cincinnati, Chicago and St. Louis Railway	
Pittsburgh, Cincinnati, Chicago and St. Louis Railroad		PRR	1917	1956	Philadelphia, Baltimore and Washington Railroad	
Pittsburgh, Cincinnati, Chicago and St. Louis Railway		PRR	1890	1917	Pittsburgh, Cincinnati, Chicago and St. Louis Railroad	
Pittsburgh, Clarion and Franklin Railroad			1912	1913	Lake Erie, Franklin and Clarion Railroad	
Pittsburg, Cleveland and Toledo Railroad		B&O	1882	1915	Pittsburgh and Western Railroad	
Pittsburgh and Connellsville Railroad		B&O	1837	1912	Baltimore and Ohio Railroad in Pennsylvania	
Pittsburgh East and West Railroad		B&O	1881	1881	Pittsburgh and Western Railroad	
Pittsburgh and Eastern Railroad		NYC	1894	1905	Beech Creek Extension Railroad	
Pittsburgh and Erie Railroad		ERIE, PRR	1846	1857	Erie and Pittsburgh Railroad, Meadville Railroad	
Pittsburgh, Fort Wayne and Chicago Railroad		PRR	1856	1861	Pittsburgh, Fort Wayne and Chicago Railway	
Pittsburgh, Fort Wayne and Chicago Railway		PRR	1860	1976	Consolidated Rail Corporation	
Pittsburgh Industrial Railroad	PIR		1996	2001	Pittsburgh and Ohio Central Railroad	
Pittsburgh, Johnstown, Ebensburg and Eastern Railroad			1897	1903	New York and Pittsburg Central Railroad	
Pittsburgh Junction Railroad		B&O	1881	1943	Pittsburgh and Western Railroad	
Pittsburg, Kittanning and Warren Railroad		PRR	1837	1852	Allegheny Valley Railroad	
Pittsburgh and Lake Erie Railroad	PLE	PLE	1875	1992	Three Rivers Railway	
Pittsburgh, Lisbon and Western Railroad	PL&W, PLW	PLE/ PRR	1902	1945	Youngstown and Southern Railway	
Pittsburgh, Lisbon and Western Railway		PLE/ PRR	1896	1902	Pittsburgh, Lisbon and Western Railroad	
Pittsburgh Local Railroad		B&O	1880	1881	Pittsburgh Junction Railroad	
Pittsburgh and Mansfield Railroad		P&WV	1893	1901	Pittsburgh, Carnegie and Western Railroad	
Pittsburgh, Marion and Chicago Railway		PLE/ PRR	1886	1896	Pittsburgh, Lisbon and Western Railway	
Pittsburgh, McKeesport and Youghiogheny Railroad		PLE	1881	1965	Pittsburgh and Lake Erie Railroad	
Pittsburgh and Moon Run Railroad		MTR	1891	1913	Montour Railroad	
Pittsburgh, New Castle and Cleveland Railroad		PRR	1857	1861	New Castle and Beaver Valley Railroad	
Pittsburgh, New Castle and Lake Erie Railroad		B&O	1877	1881	Pittsburgh and Western Railroad	
Pittsburgh and Northeastern Railroad						
Pittsburgh and Northeastern Terminal Railroad				1916	Pittsburgh and Northern Terminal Railroad	
Pittsburgh and Northern Railroad			1881			
Pittsburgh and Northern Terminal Railroad			1916			
Pittsburgh and Northwestern Railroad		B&O	1875	1877	Pittsburgh, New Castle and Lake Erie Railroad	
Pittsburgh and Ohio Valley Railway	P&OV, POV		1899	1993	Three Rivers Railway	
Pittsburg and Shawmut Railroad	PS, PSR	PS&N	1909			Still exists as a nonoperating subsidiary of the Buffalo and Pittsburgh Railroad
Pittsburg, Shawmut and Northern Railroad		PS&N	1899	1947	N/A	
Pittsburgh, Shenango and Lake Erie Railroad		B&LE	1888	1897	Pittsburg, Bessemer and Lake Erie Railroad	
Pittsburgh Southern Railroad		B&O	1878	1879	Pittsburgh Southern Railway	
Pittsburgh Southern Railway		B&O	1879	1884	Baltimore and Ohio Short Line Railroad	
Pittsburgh and State Line Railroad		B&O	1885	1887	Buffalo, Rochester and Pittsburgh Railway	
Pittsburg and Steubenville Railroad		PRR	1849	1867	Pan Handle Railway	
Pittsburgh, Summerville and Clarion Railroad			1903	1912	Pittsburgh, Clarion and Franklin Railroad	
Pittsburgh and Susquehanna Railroad			1910	1931	N/A	
Pittsburgh, Titusville and Buffalo Railway		PRR	1876	1881	Buffalo, Pittsburgh and Western Railroad	
Pittsburgh, Virginia and Charleston Railway		PRR	1870	1905	Pennsylvania Railroad	
Pittsburgh, Washington and Baltimore Railroad						
Pittsburgh and West Virginia Railroad			1967			Still exists as a lessor of the Wheeling and Lake Erie Railway
Pittsburgh and West Virginia Railway	P&WV	P&WV	1916	1967	Pittsburgh and West Virginia Railroad	
Pittsburgh and Western Railroad		B&O	1902			
Pittsburgh and Western Railroad		B&O	1879	1887	Pittsburgh and Western Railway	
Pittsburgh and Western Railway		B&O	1887	1902	Pittsburgh and Western Railroad	
Pittsburgh, Westmoreland and Somerset Railroad			1899	1916	N/A	
Pittsburgh and Whitehall Railroad		PRR	1882	1888	Pittsburgh, Virginia and Charleston Railway	
Pittsburgh, Youngstown and Ashtabula Railroad		PRR	1887	1906	Pittsburgh, Youngstown and Ashtabula Railway	
Pittsburgh, Youngstown and Ashtabula Railway		PRR	1906	1976	Consolidated Rail Corporation	
Pittsburg, Youngstown and Chicago Railroad		B&O	1880	1882	Pittsburg, Cleveland and Toledo Railroad	
Plumville Railroad		B&O	1905	1907	Buffalo and Susquehanna Railroad	
PL&W Railroad	PLW		1993	1995	Ohio and Pennsylvania Railroad	
Plymouth Railroad		RDG	1836	1976	Consolidated Rail Corporation	
Plymouth and Wilkes-Barre Road and Bridge Company		D&H	1859	1873	Northern Coal and Iron Company	
Pocono Northeast Railway	PNER		1982	1993	Luzerne and Susquehanna Railway	
Pomeroy and Newark Railroad		PRR	1881	1917	Philadelphia, Baltimore and Washington Railroad	
Pomeroy and State Line Railroad		PRR	1880	1881	Pomeroy and Newark Railroad	
Port Kennedy Railroad		RDG	1860	1872	Philadelphia and Reading Railroad	
Portland and Northern Railway			1901			
Portsmouth and Lancaster Railroad		PRR	1832	1835	Harrisburg, Portsmouth, Mountjoy and Lancaster Railroad	
Potato Creek Railroad			1907	1927	N/A	
Pottsville and Mahanoy Railroad		PRR	1883	1886	Pennsylvania Schuylkill Valley Railroad	
Pottsville and New York Railroad		LV	1882	1887	Schuylkill and Lehigh Valley Railroad	
Quakertown and Bethlehem Railroad			1916	1937	N/A	
Quakertown and Delaware River Railroad			1911	1916	Quakertown and Bethlehem Railroad	
Quakertown and Eastern Railroad			1896	1911	Quakertown and Delaware River Railroad	
Quemahoning Branch Railroad			1901			
Railroad Ventures, Inc.			1996	2001	Columbiana County Port Authority	
Reading Company	RDG	RDG	1924	1976	Consolidated Rail Corporation	
Reading Belt Railroad		RDG	1900	1923	Reading Company	
Reading and Columbia Railroad		RDG	1859	1945	Reading Company	
Reading and Lehigh Railroad		RDG	1875	1879	Schuylkill and Lehigh Railroad	
Reading and Lehigh Railroad		RDG	1856	1857	East Pennsylvania Railroad	
Reading, Marietta and Hanover Railroad		RDG	1882	1930	N/A	
Reading and Pottsville Railroad		PRR	1884	1885	Pennsylvania Schuylkill Valley Railroad	
Red Bank Railroad	RBKX		1990	1996	Pittsburg and Shawmut Railroad	
Red Bank and Youngstown Railroad		B&O	1881	1882	Pittsburgh and Western Railroad	
Redstone Central Railroad		MGA	1902		N/A	
Reno, Oil Creek and Pithole Railway		PRR	1865	1867	Oil Creek and Allegheny River Railway	
Reynoldsville and Falls Creek Railroad			1883	1934	N/A	
Ridgway and Clearfield Railroad		PRR	1882	1911	Pennsylvania Railroad	
River Front Railroad		PRR	1876	1903	Pennsylvania Railroad	
Rochester, Beaver Falls and Western Railway		PRR	1889	1890	Pennsylvania Company	
Rochester, Nunda and Pennsylvania Railroad			1873	1877	Sold at foreclosure; no property in Pennsylvania	
Rochester and Pittsburgh Railroad		B&O	1881	1885	Pittsburgh and State Line Railroad	
Rockwood and Bakersville Railway		B&O	1907	1911	Indian Creek Valley Railway	
Rocky Ridge Railroad			1907	1913	East Broad Top Railroad and Coal Company	
Rogers Railroad			1902			
Rupert and Bloomsburg Railroad		RDG	1888	1923	Reading Company	
Rural Valley Railroad		B&O	1900	1925	Allegheny and Western Railway	
St. Clair Terminal Railroad			1901	1937	Union Railroad	
St. Marys and Western Railroad			1904			
St. Marys and Southwestern Railroad		PS&N	1893	1897	Buffalo, St. Marys and Southwestern Railroad	
Salamanca, Bradford and Allegheny River Railroad		PRR	1880	1881	Buffalo, Pittsburgh and Western Railroad	
Salisbury Railroad		B&O	1875	1912	Baltimore and Ohio Railroad in Pennsylvania	
Salisbury and Baltimore Railroad and Coal Company		B&O	1871	1875	Salisbury Railroad	
Scalp Level Railroad		PRR	1897	1902	South Fork Railroad	
Schuylkill East Branch Navigation Company		RDG	1828	1829	Little Schuylkill Navigation, Railroad and Coal Company	
Schuylkill Haven and Lehigh River Railroad		RDG	1862	1863	Mine Hill and Schuylkill Haven Railroad	
Schuylkill and Juniata Railroad		PRR	1900	1902	Pennsylvania Railroad	
Schuylkill and Lehigh Railroad		RDG	1880	1923	Reading Company	
Schuylkill and Lehigh Valley Railroad		LV	1886	1949	Lehigh Valley Railroad	
Schuylkill River East Side Railroad		B&O	1883			
Schuylkill and Susquehanna Railroad		RDG	1859	1872	Philadelphia and Reading Railroad	
Schuylkill Valley Navigation Company		RDG	1828	1829	Schuylkill Valley Navigation and Railroad Company	
Schuylkill Valley Navigation and Railroad Company		RDG	1829	1950	Reading Company	
Scootac Railway			1901			
Scotland and Mont Alto Railroad		PRR	1864	1871	Mont Alto Railroad	
Scottdale Connecting Railroad			1897			
Scotts Run Railway		MGA	1923	1933	Monongahela Railway	
Scranton and Forest City Railroad		O&W	1886	1889	Ontario, Carbondale and Scranton Railway	
Scranton and Spring Brook Railroad			1897			
Shade Gap Railroad			1884	1913	East Broad Top Railroad and Coal Company	
Shamokin, Sunbury and Lewisburg Railroad		RDG	1882	1923	Reading Company	
Shamokin and Trevorton Railroad		RDG	1868	1870	Mahanoy and Shamokin Railroad	
Shamokin Valley and Pottsville Railroad		PRR	1858	1976	Consolidated Rail Corporation	
Sharon Railway		ERIE	1873	1953	Erie Railroad	
Sharon and Ceres Railroad			1901	1904	New York and Pennsylvania Railway	
Sharon Connecting Railroad						
Sharpsville Railroad		PRR	1876	1931	Erie and Pittsburgh Railroad, Western New York and Pennsylvania Railway	
Sharpsville and Oakland Railroad		PRR	1866	1876	Sharpsville Railroad	
Sharpsville, Wheatland, Sharon and Greenfield Railroad		ERIE	1870	1875	Sharon Railway	
Shawmut Connecting Railroad		PS&N	1900	1905	Pittsburg, Shawmut and Northern Railroad	
Sheffield and Spring Creek Railroad			1884	1894	Tionesta Valley Railway	
Sheffield and Tionesta Railway	S&T		1900	1943	N/A	
Shenango and Allegheny Railroad		B&LE	1867	1888	Pittsburgh, Shenango and Lake Erie Railroad	
Shenango and Beaver Valley Railway		PLE/ PRR	1902	1902	Pittsburgh, Lisbon and Western Railroad	
Shenango Valley Railroad		NYC	1886	1963	Mahoning and Shenango Valley Railway	
Sinnemahoning Portage Railroad		PRR	1865	1866	Buffalo and Washington Railway	
Sinnemahoning Valley Railroad		B&O	1885	1893	Buffalo and Susquehanna Railroad	
Slackwater Connecting Railroad			1892			
Slate Ridge and Delta Railway			1879	1888	Maryland Central Railway	
Slate Run Railroad			1884			
Slate Valley Railroad		LNE	1886	1891	Pennsylvania, Poughkeepsie and Boston Railroad	
Smethport Railroad			1899	1931	N/A	Operated by Mount Jewett, Kinzua and Riterville Railroad
Smethport and Olean Railroad		PS&N	1895	1899	Pittsburg, Shawmut and Northern Railroad	
Smithfield and Masontown Railroad		B&O	1899	1915	Fairmont, Morgantown and Pittsburg Railroad	
Somerset and Bedford Railroad		PRR	1894	1894	Pennsylvania Midland Railroad	
Somerset and Cambria Railroad		B&O	1879	1912	Baltimore and Ohio Railroad in Pennsylvania	
Somerset Coal Railway		WM	1915	1950	Western Maryland Railway	
Somerset and Mineral Point Railroad		B&O	1868	1879	Somerset and Cambria Railroad	
South Branch Railroad						
South Chester Railroad		PRR	1891	1906	Philadelphia, Baltimore and Washington Railroad	
South Easton and Phillipsburg Railroad			1899	1912	Lehigh and Hudson River Railway	
South Fork Railroad		PRR	1890	1903	Pennsylvania Railroad	
South Mountain Iron Company		RDG	1869	1877	South Mountain Railway and Mining Company	
South Mountain Railway and Mining Company		RDG	1877	1891	Gettysburg and Harrisburg Railway	
South Shore Railroad			1892			
Southern Pennsylvania Iron and Railroad Company		PRR	1869	1872	Southern Pennsylvania Railway and Mining Company	
Southern Pennsylvania Railway and Mining Company		PRR	1873	1954	Penndel Company	
Southwark Railroad		PRR	1831	1877	Philadelphia, Wilmington and Baltimore Railroad	
South West Connecting Railway		PRR	1897	1908	Pennsylvania Railroad	
South-West Pennsylvania Railway		PRR	1871	1906	Pennsylvania Railroad	
Southwestern Du Bois Railroad		B&O	1905	1907	Buffalo and Susquehanna Railroad	
Spring Brook Railroad			1871	1890	Scranton and Spring Brook Railroad	
Spring Brook Horse Railway			1869	1871	Spring Brook Railroad	
Spring Creek Railway			1902	1904	Tionesta Valley Railway	
State Line Railroad		B&O	1890	1895	Buffalo and Susquehanna Railroad	
State Line Railroad		B&O	1884	1893	Fairmont, Morgantown and Pittsburg Railroad	
State Line and Sullivan Railroad		LV	1874	1949	Lehigh Valley Railroad	
Stewart Railroad		NYC	1887	1963	Mahoning and Shenango Valley Railway	
Stewartstown Railroad	STRT		1884	1992	Continued as a tourist railroad	
Stony Creek Railroad		RDG	1868	1945	Reading Company	
Sullivan and Erie Coal and Railroad Company		LV	1865	1874	State Line and Sullivan Railroad	
Summit Branch Railroad			1846	1897	Summit Branch Coal Company	
Sunbury and Erie Railroad		PRR	1837	1861	Philadelphia and Erie Railroad	
Sunbury, Hazleton and Wilkesbarre Railway		PRR	1878	1900	Schuylkill and Juniata Railroad	
Sunbury and Lewistown Railroad		PRR	1870	1900	Schuylkill and Juniata Railroad	
Susquehanna Railroad		B&O	1891	1893	Buffalo and Susquehanna Railroad	
Susquehanna Railroad		PRR	1851	1854	Northern Central Railway	
Susquehanna, Bloomsburg, and Berwick Railroad		PRR	1902	1918	Pennsylvania Railroad	
Susquehanna and Buffalo Railroad			1891			
Susquehanna and Clearfield Railroad		PRR/NYC	1879	1901	Beech Creek Extension Railroad	Sold by the Pennsylvania Railroad to the New York Central & Hudson River Railroad in 1901
Susquehanna Connecting Railroad		ERIE	1896			
Susquehanna and Eagles Mere Railroad						
Susquehanna, Gettysburg and Potomac Railway		WM	1871	1874	Hanover Junction, Hanover and Gettysburg Railroad	
Susquehanna and New York Railroad	S&NY	LV	1902	1942	Lehigh Valley Railroad	
Susquehanna and New York Railroad		B&O	1898	1901	Buffalo and Susquehanna Railroad	
Susquehanna River and Western Railroad			1903	1939	N/A	
Susquehanna and Southern Railroad		B&O	1902	1906	Buffalo and Susquehanna Railroad	
Susquehanna and Southwestern Railroad		NYC	1882	1883	Beech Creek, Clearfield and Southwestern Railroad	
Susquehanna and Union Bridge Company		RDG	1850	1854	Trevorton and Susquehanna Railroad	
Swatara Railroad		RDG	1841	1863	Philadelphia and Reading Railroad	
Swatara and Good Spring Railroad		RDG	1840	1841	Swatara Railroad	
Tamaqua, Hazleton and Northern Railroad		RDG	1891	1923	Reading Company	
Thomas Railroad		LV/ RDG	1906	1917	Ironton Railroad	
Three Rivers Railway			1992			Still exists as a nonoperating subsidiary of CSX Transportation
Tiadaghton and Fahnastalk Railway			1892			
Tioga Railroad		ERIE	1850	1941	Erie Railroad	
Tioga Navigation Company		ERIE	1828	1852	Tioga Railroad	
Tionesta Valley Railroad			1879	1894	Tionesta Valley Railway	
Tionesta Valley Railway			1894	1941	N/A	
Tionesta Valley and Hickory Railway			1892	1911	Sheffield and Tionesta Railway	
Tionesta Valley and Salmon Creek Railway			1893	1901	Sheffield and Tionesta Railway	
Tipton Railroad		PRR	1885	1927	N/A	
Titusville and Oil City Railway		PRR	1878	1881	Buffalo, Pittsburgh and Western Railroad	
Titusville and Petroleum Centre Railroad		PRR	1870	1878	Titusville and Oil City Railway	
Towanda and Franklin Railroad		LV	1853	1854	Barclay Railroad and Coal Company	
Trenton Cut-off Railroad		PRR	1889	1902	Pennsylvania Railroad	
Trenton Delaware Bridge Company		PRR	1835	1903	N/A	
Tresckow Railroad		CNJ	1870	1963	Lehigh Coal and Navigation Company	
Trevorton Coal Company		RDG	1861	1867	Zerbe Valley Railroad	
Trevorton Coal and Railroad Company		RDG	1856	1860	Trevorton Coal Company	
Trevorton, Mahanoy and Susquehanna Railroad		RDG	1850	1854	Trevorton and Susquehanna Railroad	
Trevorton and Susquehanna Railroad		RDG	1854	1856	Trevorton Coal and Railroad Company	
Turbotville and Williamsport Railroad		PRR	1892	1893	Central Pennsylvania and Western Railroad	
Turtle Creek and Allegheny River Railroad						
Turtle Creek Valley Railroad		PRR	1886	1903	Pennsylvania Railroad	
Tuscarora Valley Railroad			1891	1934	N/A	
Tylerdale Connecting Railroad	TYC	B&O/ PRR	1899			Still exists as a nonoperating subsidiary of CSX Transportation
Tyrone and Clearfield Railroad		PRR	1854	1866	Pennsylvania Railroad, Tyrone and Clearfield Railway	
Tyrone and Clearfield Railway		PRR	1867	1903	Cambria and Clearfield Railway	
Tyrone and Lock Haven Railroad		PRR	1857	1861	Bald Eagle Valley Railroad	
Union Canal Company of Pennsylvania		RDG	1826	1866	Philadelphia and Reading Railroad	
Union Coal Company		D&H	1864	1868	Baltimore Coal and Union Railroad Company	
Union and Titusville Railroad		PRR	1866	1871	Oil Creek and Allegheny River Railway	
Uniontown Railway		PRR	1879	1879	Brownsville Railway	
Uniontown and West Virginia Railroad		PRR	1868	1877	South-West Pennsylvania Railway	
United New Jersey Railroad and Canal Company		PRR	1958	1976	Consolidated Rail Corporation	
Unity Railways	UNI		1915	1990	N/A	
Ursina and North Fork Railroad			1871	1882	Ursina and North Fork Railway	
Ursina and North Fork Railway			1882	1936	N/A	
Valley Railroad			1893	1936	N/A	
Valley Connecting Railroad			1898			
Wabash Pittsburgh Terminal Railway		P&WV	1904	1916	Pittsburgh and West Virginia Railway	
Wampum and State Line Railway		PLE/ PRR	1886	1886	Pittsburgh, Marion and Chicago Railway	
Warren and Farnsworth Railroad			1885	1894	Tionesta Valley Railway	
Warren and Farnsworth Valley Railroad			1882	1885	Warren and Farnsworth Railroad	
Warren and Franklin Railway		PRR	1864	1868	Oil Creek and Allegheny River Railway	
Warren and Tidioute Railroad		PRR	1861	1864	Warren and Franklin Railway	
Warren and Venango Railroad		NYC	1871	1873	Dunkirk, Allegheny Valley and Pittsburgh Railroad	
Washington Railroad		B&O	1879	1879	Pittsburgh Southern Railway	
Washington County Railroad		P&WV	1900	1901	Pittsburgh, Carnegie and Western Railroad	
Washington and Franklin Railroad		WM	1898	1899	Washington and Franklin Railway	
Washington and Franklin Railway		WM	1899			Owned by the Reading Company and leased to the Western Maryland Railway; still exists as a lessor of CSX Transportation, owned by Reading International, Inc.
Washington and Maryland Line Railroad		PRR	1857	1860	Columbia and Maryland Line Railroad	
Washington Run Railroad	WRN		1895	1931	N/A	
Water Gap Railroad		ERIE	1880	1881	New York, Susquehanna and Western Railroad	
Waynesburg Southern Railroad	WAS	MGA	1966	1976	Consolidated Rail Corporation	
Waynesburg and Washington Railroad	WAW	PRR	1875	1976	Consolidated Rail Corporation	
Wellsboro and Lawrenceville Railroad		NYC	1867	1873	Corning, Cowanesque and Antrim Railway	
Wellsville, Addison and Galeton Railroad	WAG		1954	1979	N/A	
West Branch Valley Railroad		NYC	1898	1901	Beech Creek Extension Railroad	
West Chester Railroad		PRR	1831	1903	Pennsylvania Railroad	
West Chester and Philadelphia Railroad		PRR	1848	1881	Philadelphia and Baltimore Central Railroad	
West Clarion Railroad		ERIE	1897	1941	Erie Railroad	
West Penn and Shenango Connecting Railroad		B&LE	1882	1889	Pittsburgh, Butler and Shenango Railroad	
West Pittston – Exeter Railroad		LV	1925			
West Reading Railroad		RDG	1860	1873	Philadelphia and Reading Railroad	
West Side Belt Railroad	WSB	P&WV	1895	1928	Pittsburgh and West Virginia Railway	
Westerman Coal and Iron Railroad		ERIE		1941	Nypano Railroad	
Western Allegheny Railroad	WAL	B&LE	1902	1967	Bessemer and Lake Erie Railroad	
Western Maryland Railroad		WM	1879	1909	Western Maryland Railway	
Western Maryland Railway	WM	WM	1909	1989	CSX Transportation	
Western New York and Pennsylvania Railroad		PRR	1887	1895	Northwestern Pennsylvania Railway	
Western New York and Pennsylvania Railway		PRR	1895	1955	Penndel Company	
Western New York and Pennsylvania Railway of Pennsylvania		PRR	1887	1887	Western New York and Pennsylvania Railroad	
Western Pennsylvania Railroad		PRR	1860	1903	Pennsylvania Railroad	
Western Washington Railroad		PRR	1900	1907	Chartiers Railway	
Westinghouse Inter-Works Railway			1902	1962		
White Deer and Logantown Railway			1906			
Wheeling, Pittsburgh and Baltimore Railroad		B&O	1872			
Wilcox and Howard Hill Improvement Company		ERIE	1870	1881	New York, Lake Erie and Western Coal and Railroad Company	
Wilkes-Barre Connecting Railroad	WBC	D&H/ PRR	1912			
Wilkes-Barre and Eastern Railroad		ERIE	1892	1941	Moosic Mountain and Carbondale Railroad	
Wilkes-Barre and Harvey's Lake Railroad		LV	1885	1904	Loyalsock Railroad	
Wilkesbarre and Pittston Railroad		PRR	1859	1867	Danville, Hazleton and Wilkes-Barre Railroad	
Wilkes-Barre and Scranton Railroad		CNJ	1851	1860	Nanticoke Railroad	
Wilkes-Barre and Scranton Railway		CNJ	1886	1963	Central Railroad of New Jersey	
Wilkesbarre and Western Railway		PRR	1886	1893	Central Pennsylvania and Western Railroad	
Williams Valley Railroad		RDG	1891	1947	Reading Company	
Williamsport and Elmira Railroad		PRR	1832	1860	Elmira and Williamsport Railroad	
Williamsport and North Branch Railroad	W&NB		1882	1921	Williamsport and North Branch Railway	
Williamsport and North Branch Railway	W&NB		1921	1937	N/A	
Wilmington and Northern Railroad		RDG	1877	1976	Consolidated Rail Corporation	
Wilmington and Reading Railroad		RDG	1866	1876	Wilmington and Northern Railroad	
Wilmington and Western Railroad		B&O	1869	1877	Delaware Western Railroad	
Wind Gap and Delaware Railroad		LNE	1880	1904	Lehigh and New England Railroad	
Winfield Railroad			1900	1979	N/A	
Wrightsville and Gettysburg Railroad		PRR	1836	1837	Wrightsville, York and Gettysburg Railroad	
Wrightsville and York Railroad		PRR	1835	1837	Wrightsville, York and Gettysburg Railroad	
Wrightsville, York and Gettysburg Railroad		PRR	1837	1870	Pennsylvania Railroad	
Wyoming and Pond Creek Railroad			1897			
York and Cumberland Railroad		PRR	1846	1854	Northern Central Railway	
York, Hanover and Frederick Railroad		PRR	1897	1914	York, Hanover and Frederick Railway	
York, Hanover and Frederick Railway		PRR	1914	1954	Penndel Company	
York Haven and Rowenna Railroad		PRR	1902	1906	Pennsylvania Railroad	
York and Maryland Line Railroad		PRR	1832	1854	Northern Central Railway	
York and Peach Bottom Railway			1882	1891	Baltimore and Lehigh Railroad	
York Southern Railroad			1894	1901	Maryland and Pennsylvania Railroad	
York Terminal Railway			1913			
Youghiogheny and Ligonier Valley Railroad		B&O	1906	1906	Indian Creek Valley Railway	
Youghiogheny Northern Railway		PLE	1881	1945	N/A	
Youghiogheny and Wick Haven Railroad			1893			
Youngstown, Lawrence and Pittsburgh Railroad		PRR	1887	1887	Pittsburgh, Youngstown and Ashtabula Railroad	
Youngstown and Southern Railway	YS	PLE/ PRR	1945	1996	Railroad Ventures, Inc.	
Zerbe Valley Railroad		RDG	1867	1870	Mahanoy and Shamokin Railroad	

== Electric ==
- Adamsville and Mohnsville Electric Railway
- Allegheny, Bellevue and Perrysville Railway
- Allegheny Traction Company
- Allegheny Valley Street Railway
- Allen Street Railway
- Allentown and Reading Traction Company
- Altoona and Logan Valley Electric Railway
- Ardmore and Llanerch Street Railway
- Bangor and Portland Traction Company
- Beaver Valley Traction Company
- Bethlehem and Nazareth Passenger Railway
- Birdsboro Street Railway
- Blue Ridge Traction Company
- Bradford Street Railroad
- Butler Passenger Railway
- Cambria Incline Plane Company
- Carbon Street Railway
- Carbondale Railway
- Carlisle and Mechanicsburg Street Railway
- Carlisle and Mount Holly Railway
- Catherine and Bainbridge Streets Railway of Philadelphia
- Centennial Passenger Railway
- Central Pennsylvania Traction Company
- Central Traction Company
- Central Valley Railroad
- Centre and Clearfield Street Railway
- Chambersburg and Gettysburg Electric Railway
- Chambersburg, Greencastle and Waynesboro Street Railway
- Chester, Darby and Philadelphia Railway
- Chester and Delaware Street Railway
- Chester and Media Electric Railway
- Chester Street Railway
- Chester Traction Company
- Citizens' Clearfield and Cambria Streets Railway
- Citizens' East End Street Railway
- Citizens' Passenger Railway
- Citizens Passenger Railway
- Citizens Traction Company
- Citizens' Traction Company of Oil City, Pennsylvania
- Clairton Street Railway
- Coal Castle Electric Railway
- Coatesville Traction Company
- Collegeville Electric Street Railway
- Colonial Street Railway
- Columbia and Montour Electric Railway
- Conestoga Traction Company
- Conneaut and Erie Traction Company
- Conshohocken Railway
- Consolidated Traction Company
- Continental Passenger Railway
- Corry and Columbus Street Railway
- Cumberland Railway
- Danville and Bloomsburg Street Railway
- Danville and Sunbury Transit Company
- Delaware County and Philadelphia Electric Railway
- Doylestown and Easton Street Railway
- Doylestown and Willow Grove Railway
- DuBois Traction Company
- Duquesne Traction Company
- East End Passenger Railway
- East McKeesport Street Railway
- East Reading Electric Railway
- Easton and Bethlehem Transit Company
- Easton, Palmer and Bethlehem Street Railway
- Easton and South Bethlehem Transit Company
- Easton Transit Company
- Electric Traction Company
- Empire Passenger Railway
- Ephrata and Adamstown Railway
- Erie Electric Motor Company
- Erie Rapid Transit Street Railway
- Erie Traction Company
- Fairchance and Smithfield Traction Company
- Fairmount Park and Haddington Passenger Railway
- Fairmount Park Transportation Company
- Federal Street and Pleasant Valley Passenger Railway
- Frankford and Southwark Philadelphia City Passenger Railway
- French Point Street Railway
- Front and Fifth Streets Railway
- Germantown Passenger Railway
- Gettysburg Electric Railway
- Girard Avenue Passenger Railway
- Green and Coates Streets Passenger Railway
- Hagerstown Railway
- Hagerstown and Frederick Railway
- Hanover and McSherrystown Street Railway
- Harrisburg City Passenger Railway
- Harrisburg and Hummelstown Street Railway
- Harrisburg and Mechanicsburg Electric Railway
- Harrisburg Traction Company
- Heston, Mantua and Fairmount Passenger Railway
- Highland Grove Traction Company
- Hillcrest Avenue Passenger Railway
- Holmesburg, Tacony and Frankford Electric Railway
- Homestead and Mifflin Street Railway
- Hummelstown and Campbellstown Street Railway
- Huntingdon, Lewistown and Juniata Valley Traction Company
- Huntingdon Street Connecting Passenger Railway
- Irwin–Herminie Traction Company
- Jefferson Traction Company
- Jersey Shore Electric Street Railway
- Johnstown Passenger Railway
- Johnstown Traction Company
- Kessler Street Connecting Passenger Railway
- Kittaning and Leechburg Railways
- Kutztown and Fleetwood Street Railway
- Lackawanna Valley Traction Company
- Lackawanna and Wyoming Valley Railroad (L&WV)
- Lake Erie Traction Company
- Lancaster and Columbia Railway
- Lancaster, Mechanicsburg and New Holland Railway
- Lancaster, Petersburg and Manheim Railway
- Lancaster and Quarryville Street Railway
- Lancaster and Rocky Springs Railway
- Lancaster and Southern Street Railway
- Lancaster, Willow Street, Lampeter and Strasburg Railway
- Lancaster and York Furnace Street Railway
- Latrobe Street Railway
- Lebanon Valley Street Railway
- Lehigh Avenue Railway
- Lehigh Traction Company
- Lehigh Valley Transit Company
- Lewisburg, Milton and Watsontown Passenger Railway
- Lewistown and Reedsville Electric Railway
- Linglestown and Blue Mountain Street Railway
- Lykens and Williams Valley Street Railway
- Mahoning Valley Street Railway
- Meadville and Cambridge Springs Street Railway
- Meadville Traction Company
- Media, Glen Riddle and Rockdale Electric Street Railway
- Media, Middletown, Aston and Chester Electric Railway
- Middletown, Highspire and Steelton Street Railway
- Monongahela Street Railway
- Montgomery and Chester Electric Railway
- Montgomery County Passenger Railway
- Montgomery County Rapid Transit Company
- Montgomery Traction Company
- Montoursville Passenger Railway
- Morningside Electric Street Railway
- Mount Vernon Electric Street Railway
- Mount Washington Street Railway
- Neversink Mountain Railway
- New Castle and Lowell Railway
- New Holland, Blue Ball and Terre Hill Street Railway
- New Homestead Street Railway
- New Jersey and Pennsylvania Traction Company
- Newtown Electric Railway
- Newtown, Langhorne and Bristol Trolley Street Railway
- Newtown and Yardley Street Railway
- Northampton Central Street Railway
- Northampton Traction Company
- Northern Cambria Street Railway
- Northern Electric Street Railway
- Northern Passenger Railway
- Norristown Passenger Railway
- Northumberland County Traction Company
- Oakdale and McDonald Street Railway
- Oil City, Rouseville and Franklin Railway
- Oil City Station Railway
- Olean, Rock City and Bradford Railroad
- Olean, Rock City and Bradford Electric Railroad
- Oley Valley Railway
- Oxford, West Grove and Avondale Street Railway
- Patterson Heights Street Railway
- Pennsylvania and Mahoning Valley Railway
- Pennsylvania and Maryland Street Railway
- Pennsylvania Motor Company
- People's Railway
- People's Passenger Railway
- People's Street Railway of Nanticoke and Newport
- Philadelphia, Bristol and Trenton Street Railway
- Philadelphia, Cheltenham and Jenkintown Passenger Railway
- Philadelphia and Chester Railway
- Philadelphia City Passenger Railway
- Philadelphia and Darby Railway
- Philadelphia and Easton Electric Railway
- Philadelphia and Easton Railway
- Philadelphia and Garrettford Street Railway
- Philadelphia and Grays Ferry Passenger Railway
- Philadelphia, Morton and Swarthmore Street Railway
- Philadelphia Rapid Transit Company
- Philadelphia Suburban Transportation Company
- Philadelphia Traction Company
- Philadelphia and West Chester Traction Company
- Philadelphia and Western Railroad
- Philadelphia and Western Railway
- Philadelphia and Willow Grove Street Railway
- Pittsburgh and Allegheny Valley Railway
- Pittsburgh and Birmingham Traction Company
- Pittsburgh and Charleroi Street Railway
- Pittsburgh, Harmony, Butler and New Castle Railway
- Pittsburgh, McKeesport and Greensburg Railway
- Pittsburgh, McKeesport and Westmoreland Railway
- Pittsburgh Railways
- Pittsburgh Traction Company
- Pittston and Scranton Street Railway
- Plymouth and Larksville Railway
- Port Carbon and Middleport Electric Railway
- Pottstown and Northern Street Railway
- Pottstown Passenger Railway
- Pottstown and Reading Street Railway
- Pottsville and Reading Railway
- Pottsville Union Traction Company
- Quakertown Traction Railway
- Reading City Passenger Railway
- Reading and Southwestern Street Railway
- Reading and Temple Electric Railway
- Reading Traction Company
- Reading Transit and Light Company
- Red Lion and Windsor Street Railway
- Ridge Avenue Connecting Railway
- Ridge Avenue Passenger Railway
- Rohrerstown, Landisville and Mount Joy Street Railway
- Roxborough, Chestnut Hill and Norristown Railway
- Schuylkill Railway
- Schuylkill Electric Railway
- Schuylkill Haven and Orwigsburg Street Railway
- Schuylkill Valley Traction Company
- Scranton Railway
- Scranton and Carbondale Traction Company
- Scranton, Dunmore, and Moosic Lake Railroad
- Scranton and Northeastern Railroad
- Scranton and Pittston Traction Company
- Scranton Traction Company
- Second and Third Streets Passenger Railway
- Seventeenth and Nineteenth Streets Passenger Railway
- Shamokin and Edgewood Electric Railway
- Shamokin Extension Electric Railway
- Shamokin and Mount Carmel Transit Company
- Sharon and New Castle Street Railway
- Sharon and Wheatland Street Railway
- Shingle House Railroad
- Slate Belt Electric Street Railway
- South Bethlehem and Saucon Street Railway
- South Side Passenger Railway
- South Waverly Street Railway
- Southwestern Street Railway
- Stroudsburg Passenger Railway
- Stroudsburg, Water Gap and Portland Railway
- Suburban Rapid Transit Street Railway
- Sunbury and Northumberland Electric Railway
- Susquehanna Traction Company
- Tamaqua and Lansford Street Railway
- Tamaqua and Pottsville Electric Railroad
- Thirteenth and Fifteenth Streets Passenger Railway
- Titusville Electric Traction Company
- Trappe and Limerick Electric Street Railway
- Trenton, New Hope and Lambertville Street Railway
- Tri-State Railway and Electric Company
- Twenty-Second Street and Allegheny Avenue Passenger Railway
- Union Passenger Railway
- Union Traction Company of Philadelphia
- United Traction Company
- United Traction Company of Pittsburgh
- United Traction Street Railway
- Vallamont Traction Company
- Valley Street Railway
- Valley Traction Company
- Walnut Street Connecting Passenger Railway
- Warren County Traction Company
- Warren and Jamestown Street Railway
- Warren Street Railway
- Washington and Canonsburg Railway
- Waverly, Sayre and Athens Traction Company
- Webster, Monessen, Belle Vernon and Fayette City Street Railway
- West Chester Street Railway
- West Chester, Kennett and Wilmington Electric Railway
- West Fairview and Marysville Electric Street Railway
- West Penn Railways
- West Philadelphia Passenger Railway
- West Side Electric Street Railway
- Western New York and Pennsylvania Traction Company
- Westmoreland County Railway
- White Hill and Mechanicsburg Passenger Railway
- Whitehall Street Railway
- Wilkes-Barre Railroad
- Wilkes-Barre Railway
- Wilkes-Barre, Dallas and Harvey's Lake Railway
- Wilkes-Barre and Hazleton Railroad
- Wilkes-Barre and Wyoming Valley Traction Company
- Williamsport Passenger Railway
- Wissahickon Electric Passenger Railway
- Wrightsville and York Street Railway
- Yardley, Morrisville and Trenton Street Railway
- York and Dallastown Electric Railway
- York and Dover Electric Railway
- York Haven Street Railway
- York Street Railway
- Youngsville and Sugar Grove Street Railway

== Private carriers ==
- Birmingham Coal Company
- Clinton Coal Company
- H.B. Hays and Brothers Coal Railroad
- Lawrence Ore Company
- Leiper Railroad
- Mehard Coal Company
- Perry Lumber Company
- Shawnee Railroad

== Passenger carriers ==
- Mauch Chunk, Summit Hill and Switchback Railroad
- Mauch Chunk Switchback Railway
- Quakertown & Eastern Railroad
- Valley Forge Scenic Railroad
- Wawa and Concordville Railroad

== Not completed ==
- Blue Mountain Railroad
- Duncannon, Landisburg and Broad Top Railroad
- Harrisburg and Hamburg Railroad
- Harrisburg and South Mountain Railroad
- Pennsylvania Pacific Railway
- Philipsburg and Johnstown Railroad
- Pittsburgh, Binghamton & Eastern Railroad
- Shermans Valley and Broad Top Railroad
- South Mountain Railroad
- South Pennsylvania Railroad
- South Side Railroad
