= PJE =

PJE can refer to:

- Private Jet Expeditions, a defunct American charter airline
- Petit Jean Electric Cooperative, an electric utility based in Arkansas, U.S.
- Program for Joint Education, part of the American system of Joint Professional Military Education
- PJe, a computer system used for electronic process of law in Brazil
- Parachute jumping exercise; see List of aviation, avionics, aerospace and aeronautical abbreviations
- Youth and Employment Program, run by Dominican lawyer and politician Francisco Domínguez Brito

== See also ==
- P. J. E. Peebles, a Canadian-American astrophysicist
- Pittsburgh, Johnstown, Ebensburg and Eastern Railroad, a 19th-century railroad corporation in Pennsylvania, U.S.
