= Ezr =

Ezr or EZR may refer to:

- EZR (gene), encoding Ezrin
- Book of Ezra of the Hebrew Bible
- Elizabethtown Industrial Railroad, a switching and terminal railroad in Pennsylvania
- EZAir, a Dutch airline in the Caribbean Netherlands
- Josef Ezr (1
