= OCRR =

OCRR can mean:

- Old Colony Railroad in Massachusetts, USA (incorporated 1844)
- earlier Old Colony Railroad (incorporated 1838), see New Bedford and Taunton Railroad, its name from 1839 to 1873
- Oil Creek Railroad in Pennsylvania, USA
- Ottawa Central Railway in Ontario and Quebec, Canada
