= Clearfield Coalfield =

Coal mining area in Pennsylvania, US

Coordinates: 40.92°N 78.49°W

The Clearfield Coalfield is a bituminous coal mining area in Clearfield County, Pennsylvania, United States. The coal seams are found in most parts of Clearfield County, with the notable exception of the northern part of the county.

== Mining history ==
The entrance of the Pennsylvania Railroad's extension from Tyrone, northwest to Philipsburg and Clearfield opened much of the field to coal mining. Later the New York Central (NYC) built the Beech Creek Railroad from Jersey Shore up Beech Creek and entered Clearfield from the northeast. This line bypassed Clearfield and extended south to Mahaffey and eventually into Indiana County. Other rail lines included the Buffalo, Rochester and Pittsburgh Railroad's extension down Anderson Creek to Clearfield, NYC's extension to Clearfield and down the Susquehanna River to Keating, and the Bell's Gap Railroad, which ran through the southern part of the county through Mahaffey. Each railroad opened numerous coal company towns such as Surveyor, Croft, Karthaus and Bald Hill on NYC's Susquehanna River line. Numerous other towns were built such as Gaazam, Glen Richey, Peale, Winburne (Summerville), Hawk Run, Morrisdale and Irvona.

The active mining of these fields has been greatly reduced since the 1970s. Some coal is obtained via strip-mining for the power plant at Shawville and other private enterprises. There were no active underground mines in Clearfield County as of 2007.
