= Pittsburgh and State Line Railroad =

== Origin ==
Along with the Rochester and Pittsburgh Railroad Company, the Pittsburgh and State Line Railroad Company emerged on 29 January 1881 from the remains of the Rochester and State Line Railroad when it was acquired by a New York syndicate.

== Other sources ==
- http://www.silverlakeview.com/br&p/br&p.htm
