= Brock Railroad =

Subsidiary of Warren Car Company

The Brock Railroad was a wholly owned subsidiary of the Warren Car Company of Warren, PA. The business entity Brock Railroad Company was created with the Pennsylvania Department of State on February 17, 1982.
