= East Berlin Railroad =

The East Berlin Railroad was a short line that operated in Adams County, Pennsylvania, principally handling agricultural traffic.

The railroad was originally incorporated as the Berlin Branch Railroad on March 3, 1876. It was built from Berlin Junction on the Hanover Junction, Hanover and Gettysburg Railroad north seven miles to East Berlin, opening in May 1877. The railroad was initially operated by the HJH&G, which came under the control of the Western Maryland Railway in 1886.

The company was reorganized as the East Berlin Railway on July 9, 1903, and began operating as an independent railroad. On July 18, 1914, the railroad was foreclosed on, and reorganized as the East Berlin Railroad on September 8, 1914. Operations ceased the day after, and the rails were removed from East Berlin south to Abbottstown. Threatened with the loss of its charter, work resumed on the railroad in 1916; track was re-laid into East Berlin, and the line went back into operation on May 27, 1916.

The East Berlin bought a gasoline railcar in 1929. Operations again ceased on November 15, 1939, and the whole railroad was scrapped in 1940.
