= Montrose Branch =

The Montrose Branch of the Lehigh Valley Railroad was a branch line that operated in Wyoming and Susquehanna County, Pennsylvania from 1872 to 1976. Originally opened as a 3 ft (914 mm) narrow gauge under the control of the Lehigh Valley, it was converted to standard gauge in 1903, several years after the Lehigh Valley acquired complete control of the railroad. It was abandoned in 1976 when the Lehigh Valley was merged into Conrail.

== Montrose Railroad ==
The branch was originally chartered in April 1869 as the Montrose Railroad by residents of Montrose, Pennsylvania, who sought to connect with the Pennsylvania and New York Canal & Railroad Company, a Lehigh Valley subsidiary, at Tunkhannock, Pennsylvania. They were unable to raise funds for its construction on their own, and in 1872, the Lehigh Valley bought about 55% of the company's stock and built 22 miles (35 km) of narrow gauge line from Tunkhannock to Hunter's. It was extended about 3 miles (4.8 km) the following year, but restrictions on the company's borrowing it delayed the completion of the line to Montrose, 2 miles (3.2 km) further, until 1876. James Blakslee, a Lehigh Valley official, served as president of the railroad, which, however, operated independently. Around 1895, the first 6 miles (9.7 km) or so out of Tunkhannock were dual-gauged to allow standard gauge trains to operate over that portion of the line. The Lehigh Valley took over operations on January 10, 1898.

== Montrose Branch ==
Narrow-gauge operations continued until November 1903, when the Lehigh Valley converted the branch to standard gauge. It was foreclosed on September 2, 1905 and reorganized as the Montrose Railroad on October 26, 1905. In the process, Lehigh Valley gained control of all the capital stock of the new corporation, which was leased to the Lehigh Valley on November 1, 1905. The Montrose Railroad existed as a paper corporation until December 31, 1949, when it was merged into the Lehigh Valley. The line to Montrose continued to operate as a Lehigh Valley branch until June 1972, when it was damaged by flooding caused by Hurricane Agnes. It was formally abandoned when the Lehigh Valley was incorporated into Conrail in 1976.
