= Bangor and Portland Railway =

Railroad in Pennsylvania, USA

Overview
- Locale: Bangor, Pennsylvania to Portland, Pennsylvania
- Dates of operation: 1879–1909
- Successor: Delaware, Lackawanna and Western Railroad

Technical
- Track gauge: 4 ft 8 1/2 in (1,435 mm) standard gauge

The Bangor and Portland Railway (B&P) was an American railroad incorporated in 1879. It began operations between Bangor and Portland, Pennsylvania, the following year. In 1880, the company merged with the Bangor and Bath Railroad, giving an extension to Bath. A branch opened in 1885 from Bangor, extending along Martins Creek to connect with the Pennsylvania Railroad at the town of Martins Creek on the Delaware River. The Delaware, Lackawanna and Western Railroad (DL&W) acquired the B&P as its Bangor and Portland Division in July 1903, and fully absorbed it six years later.

== Structures ==
This railroad crosses Martins Creek on an unusual bridge with two different spans, a 67-foot (20 m) riveted deck girder and a 56-foot (17 m) riveted lattice deck truss. The bridge originally had two 67-foot (20 m) deck girder spans, but these were doubled up to increase their strength. The 56-foot (17 m) lattice deck truss spans were salvaged from Bridge No. 138 on the DL&W's Buffalo Division and a new abutment constructed to accommodate the shorter span.

The bridge is the second at the location. The first, a trestle, was wrecked by the 1955 flood caused by Hurricane Diane. The DL&W abandoned it and built the current bridge. Its remains are still visible.
