= Eagles Mere Railroad =

The Eagles Mere Railroad was a 3 ft (914 mm) narrow gauge railroad in Sullivan County, Pennsylvania, built in 1892 to connect the resort of Eagles Mere with the standard gauge Williamsport and North Branch Railroad at Sonestown, 8 miles (13 km) away by rail. It was leased to the connecting Williamsport & North Branch in 1901, which continued to operate it as a narrow gauge, and extended it in 1902–3 to Eagles Mere Park and a connection with the narrow gauge Susquehanna and Eagles Mere Railroad, a logging railroad. The line went through a receivership and reorganization in 1911–2, and a second in 1920, due to increasing competition with automobiles for traffic to Eagles Mere. It was reorganized again in 1922 as the Eagles Mere Railway, operating independently of the W&NB, but ended passenger service in 1923 and freight service in 1927. It was abandoned in 1928.
