= Oil Creek and Allegheny River Railway =

Map

The Oil Creek and Allegheny River Railway was an American railroad company that was located in western Pennsylvania.

== History and notable features ==
Initially incorporated under a special act of Pennsylvania on April 17, 1861, as the Warren and Tidioute Railway, the railroad changed its name to the Warren and Franklin Railway on March 31, 1864. It was later renamed the Oil Creek and Allegheny River Railway on February 26, 1868, when it was consolidated with the Oil Creek Railroad, the Farmers Railroad, and the Oil City and Pithole Railroad.

In 1869, John Pitcairn was appointed its general manager.

The company was sold at foreclosure on December 29, 1875, and was acquired on February 8, 1876, by the Pittsburgh, Titusville and Buffalo Railway, which eventually became part of the Western New York and Pennsylvania Railway and the Pennsylvania Railroad.

During the period just prior to foreclosure, from 1874 to 1875, the company's president was John Scott, and its treasurer was H. A. Phillips.

== See also ==
- Oil Creek Railroad

== Gallery ==
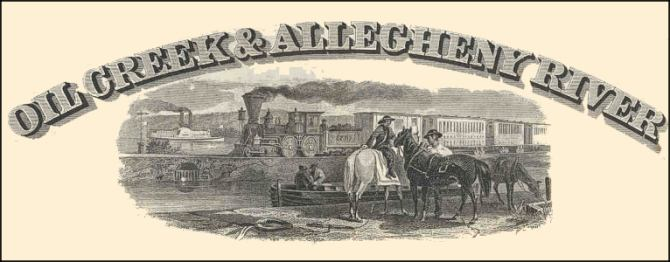
Oil Creek and Allegheny River Railway stock certificate

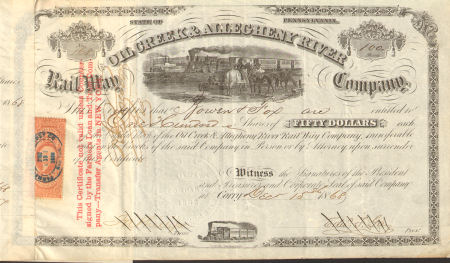
Oil Creek and Allegheny River Railway, $50 stock certificate, c. 1868-1876
