= Schuylkill and Juniata Railroad =

Map

The Schuylkill and Juniata Railroad Company was a railroad company formed on 1 June 1900 from the consolidation of five subsidiaries of the Pennsylvania Railroad (PRR). The predecessor component railroads were the Pennsylvania Schuylkill Valley; Nescopec; North and West Branch; Sunbury, Hazleton and Wilkesbarre; and the Sunbury and Lewistown. These lines all served the Coal Region of northeastern Pennsylvania. The company was absorbed into the PRR in 1902.
