= Pittsburgh and Susquehanna Railroad =

The Pittsburgh and Susquehanna Railroad owned a 17-mile (27 km) railroad that operated between Philipsburg and Fernwood, Pennsylvania, with a 2-mile (3.2 km) branch to Beaver Run.

== History and notable features ==
The main line of this railroad was built by the Altoona and Philipsburg Connecting Railroad (nicknamed the "Alley Popper"), and was incorporated in July 1892. Through successive foreclosures and reorganizations, the property passed to the New York and Pittsburgh Air Line Railroad in April 1906, the Philipsburg Railroad in January 1907, the Philipsburg and Susquehanna Valley Railroad in December 1909, and the Pittsburgh and Susquehanna Railroad in March 1910. Finally, in August 1913, that company was reorganized once more, under the same name.

The line was abandoned in 1936; it had been placed in receivership in April 1931 and ceased operations on August 8, 1931 due to poor track condition. The receiver was unable to raise money for repairs, despite authorization from the Interstate Commerce Commission (ICC) to issue $20,000 of receiver's certificates, and the ICC approved abandonment in October 1936.

== In popular culture ==
The railroad staged a train wreck in 1914 for the film The Valley of Lost Hope, a Western directed by Romaine Fielding.

== See also ==
- Pittsburgh, Johnstown, Ebensburg and Eastern Railroad
