= Neversink Mountain Electric Railway =

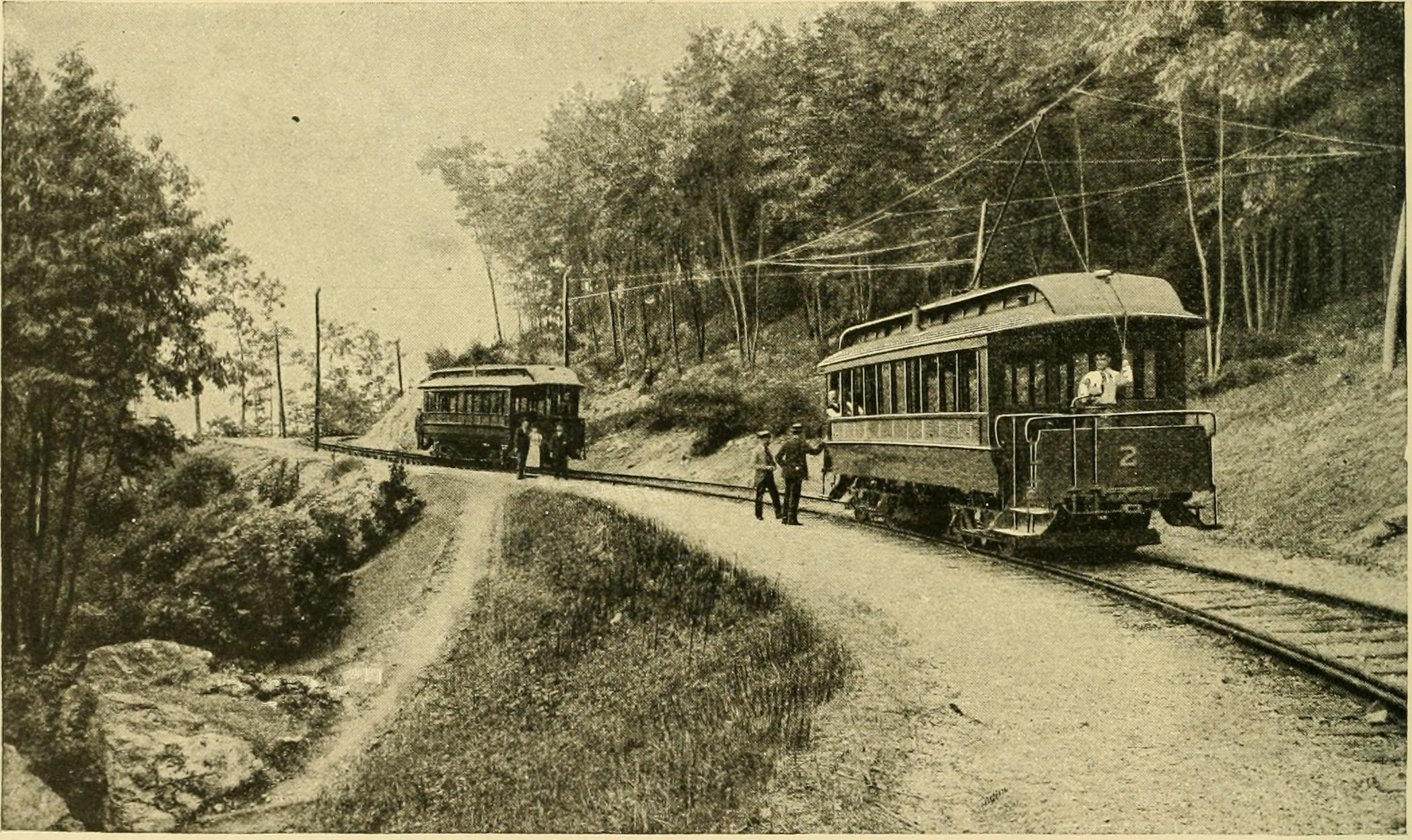
Neversink Mountain Electric Railway at the summit of Neversink Mountain

The Neversink Mountain Electric Railway ran out of Reading, Pennsylvania onto the summit of Neversink Mountain.

== History and notable features ==
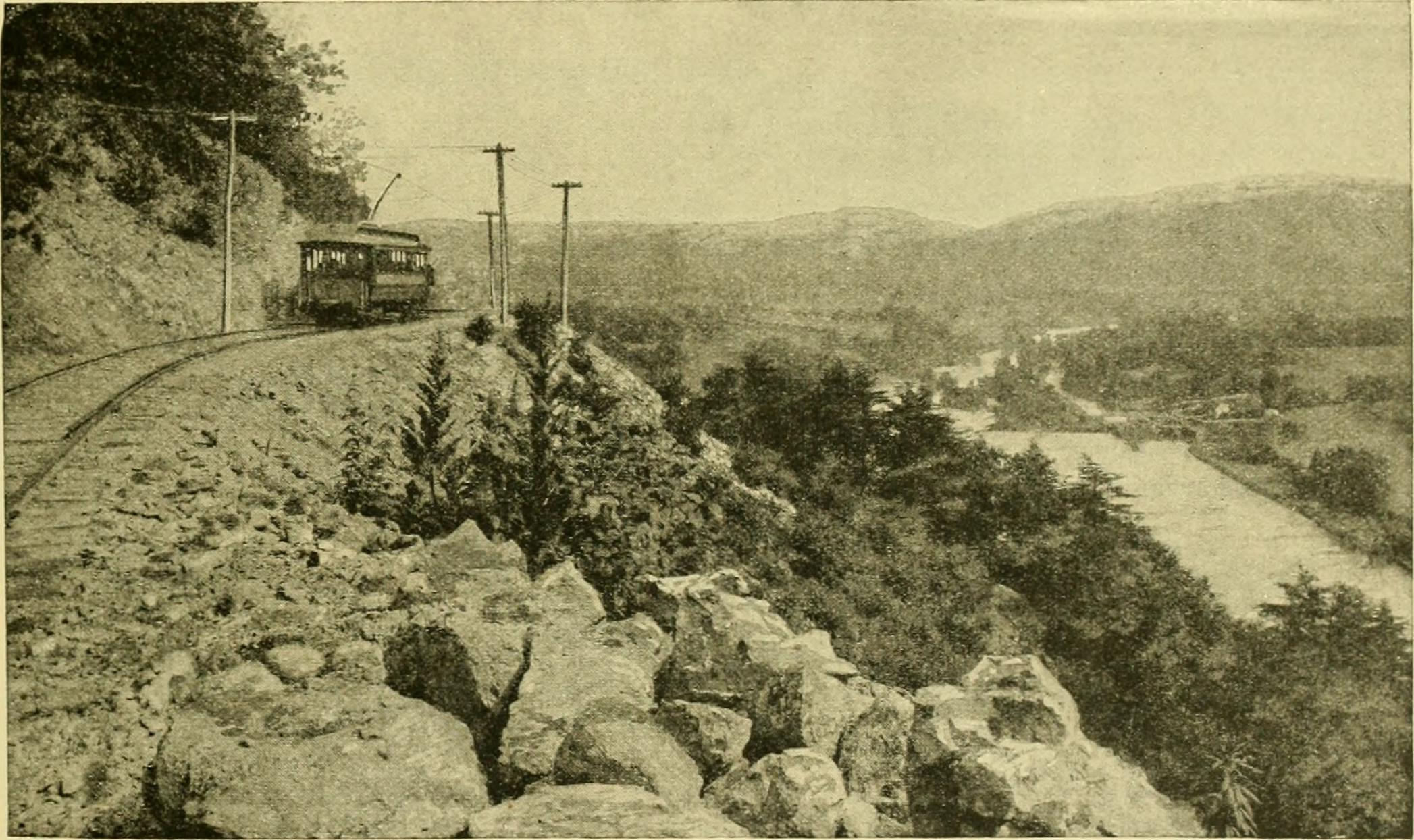
Electric car, midway up the mountain, with the Schuylkill Valley in the distance

The line started from the heart of the manufacturing center of Reading to the very pinnacle of Neversink. The physical conditions of the route proposed and demanded by travelers was daunting. The twelve-mile railway followed a grade of 3.4 to 6.4 per cent, running along the path of an electric motor through a series of curves and one switch-back. After reaching the top, the railroad wound its course down the other side to Klapperthall Park, passing pleasure resorts and picnic grounds through the Schuylkill River valley.

Operations began during the summer of 1890 with cars run by Edison No. 6, double reduction 15-horse-power streetcar motors. When empty, the cars weighed thirteen tons; when operating, they frequently carried one hundred passengers. Newer cars had two new twenty-five-horse-power, single reduction motors. By 1891, there were six 38 foot (12 m) long cars that were of the Brill double truck pattern. Through the excellence of the motors and construction and the special oil boxes there was almost no noise.

The power station was situated on the Schuylkill River, at the extreme end of the line. It consisted of two Edison eighty-kilowatt generators, driven from counter shafting operated by two turbines. The weight of the cars, the type of rails, and character of the roadbed, closely resembled a steam railway line, and indicated that the Edison General Electric Company did not intend to limit its operations to ordinary streetcar work.
