= Buffalo, Pittsburgh and Western Railroad =

Overview
- Locale: Western New York
- Dates of operation: 1881–1883
- Successor: Buffalo, New York and Philadelphia Railroad

Technical
- Track gauge: 3 ft (914 mm)

The Buffalo, Pittsburgh and Western Railroad was a 3 ft (914 mm) narrow gauge railroad in western New York. On January 22, 1881, the Pittsburgh, Titusville & Buffalo Railway Company merged with the Buffalo, Pittsburgh and Western Railway Company, the Salamanca, Bradford and Allegheny River Railroad, the Salamanca, Bradford and Allegheny River Railroad Company of New York, and the Titusville and Oil City Railway Company to form the Buffalo, Pittsburgh and Western Railroad Company.

Almost two years later, on February 14, 1883, the Buffalo, Pittsburgh and Western merged with the Buffalo, New York and Philadelphia Railway, the Olean and Salamanca Railroad, and the Oil City and Chicago Railroad Company (of April, 1882) to form the Buffalo, New York and Philadelphia Railroad. Also in 1883, conversion to 4 ft 8 1/2 in (1,435 mm) standard gauge over all the lines began.
