= Luzerne and Susquehanna Railway =

Shortline railroad in Pennsylvania

- Map

Overview
- Headquarters: Owego, New York
- Reporting mark: LS, LSX
- Locale: Luzerne County, Pennsylvania
- Dates of operation: 1994–

Technical
- Track gauge: 4 ft 8 1/2 in (1,435 mm) standard gauge

The Luzerne and Susquehanna Railway is a shortline railroad in Luzerne County, Pennsylvania. It both serves local traffic and connects to the Reading Blue Mountain and Northern Railroad in Pittston and to the Norfolk Southern Railway at three separate junctions. It operates a total of 55 miles of track in and around the Wyoming Valley in Luzerne County.

When founded in 1994, the railway incorporated tracks from a variety of defunct railroads, including the Pocono Northeast Railroad, Lehigh Valley Railroad, and Delaware, Lackawanna and Western Railroad. Major commodities hauled by the Luzerne and Susquehanna include chemicals, packaging, building products, and food & beverage. The total number of cars transported in 2010 numbered nearly 4000.

The Luzerne and Susquehanna Railway is headquartered at 25 Delphine Street in Owego, New York, as part of a holding company for three shortline railroads in the Twin Tiers along with a disjunct shortline railroad in Mississippi. The line's tracks are owned by the Luzerne County Redevelopment Authority.

The railroad was leased by R.J. Corman Railroad Group on August 19, 2020, with the lease expiring on October 30, 2026.

In 2026, the Luzerne County Council voted to sell the line to the Reading, Blue Mountain, and Northern Railroad for $7 million cash upfront, with the promise of an additional $3 million in track upgrades from the RBMN.
