= Electronic process of law in Brazil =

Electronic process of law is a nowadays phenomenon, related to the use of computer systems in courts and other public departments in their procedural activities.

== System and applications of electronic process ==
Information systems are not the same as applications. Both are sited inside the scope of the generic words meaning of software, Systems are related to structure and paradigm; application to a specific implementation and esthetic and functional elements. Some information systems in Brazil are the PROJUDI, the Slapsoftware, the e-CNJ, the e-STF, the PJe, the Themis, SAJ. and the Mavenflip . The applications are many and subordinated to the systems, for instance, the e-proc.

== Law ==
In Brazil, since 2006, there is a law dealing about the electronic process, it's the Law nº 11419 of 2006, without which there would not be the possibility of the phenomenon in its strict sense, that is the substitution of paper as primary source of information. This law is also important to kill the polemic about the validity of non-traditional communications means in legal procedures enrolled by former rules.

== See also ==
- Lawsuit
- Virtual world
- Audiovisual
- Procedural law
- Judicial power

== Bibliography ==
- Almeida Filho, José Carlos Araújo, Processo Eletrônico e Teoria Geral do Processo Eletrônico, Forense, 2007
- Clementino, Edilberto Barbosa, Processo Judicial Eletrônico em Conformidade com a Lei 11.419, de 19/12/2006, Juruá, 2006
