= Aliquippa and Ohio River Railroad =

Short line railroad in Aliquippa, Pennsylvania

Overview
- Headquarters: Coshocton, Ohio
- Reporting mark: AOR
- Locale: Western Pennsylvania
- Dates of operation: 2002–present

Technical
- Track gauge: 4 ft 8 1/2 in (1,435 mm) standard gauge
- Length: 6 mi (9.7 km)

Other
- Website: www.gwrr.com/aor/

The Aliquippa and Ohio River Railroad (reporting mark AOR) is a six-mile short line railroad in Aliquippa, Pennsylvania, United States, controlled by Genesee & Wyoming Inc. through its ownership of the Ohio Central Railroad System. It lies between CSX Transportation's ex-Pittsburgh and Lake Erie Railroad line and the Ohio River, extending south from CSX's yard in northern Aliquippa to near the Ambridge-Aliquippa Bridge. Formerly known as the Aliquippa and Southern Railroad (reporting mark ALQS), its owner and primary customer was LTV Steel, which mostly closed its Aliquippa plant in 1985 and sold the line to the Ohio Central in 2002. The AOR now connects the Aliquippa Industrial Park, which occupies the LTV site, with CSX.

== History ==
The Jones and Laughlin Steel Company (J&L) incorporated the Aliquippa and Southern Railroad in November 1906 to serve its new plant at Aliquippa, downriver from its Pittsburgh location. The majority of the line was opened by the end of 1910, and in 1921 the Interstate Commerce Commission declared it to be a common carrier. Although the vast majority of its service was to J&L, several other local businesses shipped over the line.

LTV Steel acquired J&L in 1968, and in 1985 it shut down most of the Aliquippa plant. The bankrupt LTV sold the railroad to the Ohio Central Railroad System in late 2002, and the newly created Aliquippa and Ohio River Railroad began operations on November 15. The rail access has since attracted businesses such as Wolfpac Technologies to the Aliquippa Industrial Park, developed by the Beaver County Corporation for Economic Development on the old steel mill property. Major commodities shipped over the line include bricks, aggregates, and plastics.

The company was acquired by Genesee & Wyoming in 2008 as part of its purchase of the Ohio Central Railroad System.
