= Three Rivers Railway =

The Three Rivers Railway was a railroad that was owned by CSX Transportation.

CSX created the Three River Railway to take control of lines that the Pittsburgh and Lake Erie Railroad were selling. The Pittsburgh and Lake Erie sold lines to the Three Rivers Railway and the P&LE eventually changed its name to Pittsburgh and Lake Erie Properties. The P&LE is still in existence while the Three Rivers Railway was merged into CSX Transportation.

The railway's name refers to the Allegheny River, Monongahela River, and Ohio River.

The Amtrak "Three Rivers" passenger train route formerly ran on the Three Rivers Railway. "Three Rivers" was a daily Amtrak train running between Chicago and New York City beginning in 1995 until service ended in 2005.
