= Pittsburgh, Johnstown, Ebensburg and Eastern Railroad =

Railroad corporation in Pennsylvania

The Pittsburgh, Johnstown, Ebensburg and Eastern Railroad was a railroad corporation in Pennsylvania, intended to unite two local short lines in Clearfield, Blair and Cambria Counties and create a coal-hauling railroad to compete with the Pennsylvania Railroad (PRR). Highly speculative, the railroad never had the financing necessary to begin construction. Chartered in 1897, it began to lose control of the two short lines in 1900, but continued to litigate the matter until 1909. Left a paper corporation without railroad property, it was dissolved a few years later.

== Charter and origins ==
The company was chartered on October 2, 1897, to build a railroad between the Baltimore and Ohio Railroad at Johnstown and the Altoona and Philipsburg Connecting Railroad (A&PC) at Ramey. The line would climb north from Johnstown along Hinkston Run to Ebensburg, and turn east to cut across the drainages to Loretto. From there, it would follow the PRR's Cresson and Irvona Branch, connecting with the Altoona and Beech Creek Railroad (A&BC) at Dean before turning away to cross the Pennsylvania and Northwestern Railroad at Utahville and descending to Ramey. It obtained a lease of the A&PC on October 20, 1897.

The principal figure behind the line was Samuel P. Langdon, a mine owner in the Clearfield Coalfield. Rail shipments from the coalfield were almost entirely controlled by the PRR, and Langdon had already chartered and built the A&PC and engaged in a court battle for control of the A&BC. The PJE&E represented an extension of Langdon's original plan to connect the two railroads, giving Altoona and the southern Clearfield Coalfield an alternative outlet to the PRR, via the Beech Creek Railroad (New York Central) at Philipsburg. Langdon's earlier battle for control of the A&BC (then known as the Altoona, Clearfield & Northern) had ended in failure when a group of stockholders he had contracted with failed to deliver a controlling interest in the railroad. In the aftermath, he brought suit against the group, who subsequently gained control of the AC&N after it was foreclosed and reorganized as the A&BC. To settle the lawsuit, they leased the A&BC to the PJE&E on highly favorable terms.

== Failure ==
Langdon's plan was speculative in the extreme. Construction south of Loretto would be difficult and the grade steep; nor was the A&BC's steep, twisting line into Altoona particularly suitable for heavy coal traffic. Short on funds, no construction work was done on the PJE&E proper. It did order two narrow gauge engines for the A&BC in 1901. In the meantime, the lease of the A&BC was annulled by the Court of Common Pleas of Blair County in 1900, due to Langdon's failure to complete the PJE&E. The latter company appealed to the Supreme Court of Pennsylvania, and obtained an extension until January 1, 1902, to complete its railroad and retain the lease. It did not succeed in doing any new construction, and the Blair County sheriff ejected the PJE&E's officers from the A&BC at the end of 1901.

The PJE&E did continue to operate the A&PC from Phillipsburg to Ramey. On August 1, 1903, the PJE&E was sold to the New York and Pittsburg Central Railroad, an unincorporated railroad run by Langdon. However, suit was brought against the company by the A&PC bondholders, including W.L. Shellenberger, president of the A&BC and head of the stockholders whom Langdon had sued. They sought to have the A&PC placed in receivership, terminating the PJE&E operation. Legal skirmishing continued for the next several years, during which Langdon sold off two of the A&PC's new engines. The case was finally settled in 1906, when the court ordered the A&PC to be sold on April 1, 1906, should it default on the first mortgage payments, as it inevitably would.

== Legal maneuvers ==
On April 1, it was announced that the A&PC had been bought by the New York and Pittsburgh Air Line Railroad, which had been organized on March 22, 1906. One of the directors was John Langdon, a mine owner in Huntingdon County and probably a relative and agent of Samuel P. As the road was then in the hands of a court-appointed receiver, the NY&PAL's ability to carry out this transaction was highly suspect. It did briefly operate the A&PC, which in the meantime was sold to David L. Krebs, for the bondholders; the sheriff of Clearfield County turned the railroad over to him on September 27, and it was reorganized as the Philipsburg Railroad the next year. Litigation by the NY&PAL to regain control continued, unsuccessfully, until 1909. The PJE&E, which had managed to get a number of the A&PC's gondola cars returned to Langdon's Oak Ridge Coal Co. rather than to the A&PC, remained in existence as a paper railroad and was foreclosed on April 12, 1909. It was reorganized as the Philipsburg and Johnstown Railroad on September 14, 1909, and was listed as defunct by the Public Utilities Commission in 1911–1912.
