= McKees Rocks Industrial Railroad =

Overview
- Headquarters: McKees Rocks, Pennsylvania
- Reporting mark: MRIE
- Locale: McKees Rocks, Pennsylvania
- Dates of operation: –2023

Technical
- Track gauge: 4 ft 8 1/2 in (1,435 mm) standard gauge

The McKees Rocks Industrial Railroad (reporting mark MRIE), formerly the Pittsburgh, Allegheny and McKees Rocks Railroad (PAM), was a switching railroad that served industrial complexes in McKees Rocks, Pennsylvania. It formerly served the Baltimore and Ohio Railroad (former Pittsburgh and Western Railway) yard across the Ohio River via a car ferry service, operated until 1926 with the steamboat "Steel Queen".

== Interchanges ==
- McKees Rocks
  - P&OC
  - CSX

== Roster ==
Road No.	Model
HHC 8821	NW2
