= Bell's Gap Railroad =

Railroad in Pennsylvania

Coordinates: 40.6377778°N 78.3858333°W

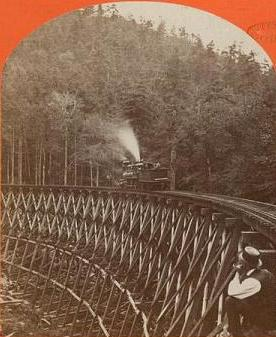
- Bell's Gap Railroad, Collier Trestle

Technical
- Line length: 8 1/2 miles (10 km)
- Track gauge: 1,435 mm (4 ft 8 1/2 in)
- Old gauge: 3 ft (914 mm)

The Bell's Gap Railroad was a 8 1/2 miles (13.7 km) long railroad in Pennsylvania. It was inaugurated in 1873 and consolidated in 1874. The original construction was narrow-gauge.

== History ==
The Bell's Gap Railroad Company was incorporated under the general law of Pennsylvania on 11 May 1871, to construct a railway from Bell's Mills, on the Pennsylvania Railroad, to Lloyds in Cambria County. The construction began in 1872, and the 8 1/2 miles (13.7 km) long line was put in operation in June 1873.

The Pennsylvania & North Western Railroad Company became the successor by change of name of the Bell's Gap Railroad Company on 9 May 1874.

In 1883 and 1884, the Pennsylvania & North Western Railroad Company (under control of the Pennsylvania Railroad) converted the original 3 foot gauge trackage to standard gauge.

== Route and track ==
The grade was very heavy, the maximum of 158.4 feet to the mile (3.0 %) being continuous for 6 3/4 miles (10 km).

The sharpest curvature was 28° with a 206 feet (63 m) radius. There were ten of these curves on the maximum grade, two of which were 600 feet (180 m) long with a turning an angle of 168°.

The weight of rail was 35 pounds to the yard (17.5 kg/m).

== Rolling stock ==
The weight of the engines was 15 tons. The following rolling stock was used in 1875:

- 2 locomotives
- 2 passenger cars
- 78 freight cars

== Operation ==
Operations for year ending 31 December 1875 were as follows:

- Gross earnings: $38,146.42
- Operating expenses: $18,504.85 (48.49 %)
- Net earnings, $19,641.57
