= Elizabethtown Industrial Railroad =

Switching and terminal railroad in Pennsylvania

The Elizabethtown Industrial Railroad (reporting mark EZR) is a switching and terminal railroad operating since 2015 on about 1 mile of track in the vicinity of Elizabethtown, Pennsylvania, United States. The railroad owns two EMD SW1200 locomotives of which one is active. Number 19 is leased by Evraz company. Number 33 is leased by Trinity Industries.

== Operations ==
The Elizabethtown Industrial Railroad began with a yellow GE 45-ton centercab locomotive bearing no markings. The locomotive had briefly been in New Freedom, PA, on the western end of the Stewartstown Railroad before being moved to the industrial park a short distance west of the borough of Elizabethtown. It was sold to Erie Coke in Erie, PA, and shipped to its new owner via flatbed truck.

Following the closure of the Evraz Claymont Steel mill in Claymont, DE, in December 2013, the company acquired three end-cab EMD switchers via auction held on March 5, 2014. The locomotives were No. 33 (formerly USS 33, ex-948, and ex-OIM 948), an EMD SW1200; No. 115 (ex-USS 115, ex-NPBL 115), also an SW1200; and No. 919, an SW9 (ex-GSS in Alabama, ex-Conrail 9060, ex-PC 9060, ex-PRR 9060, ex-PRR 8860). Dozens of gondola and flat cars were also offered for sale, but most or all of these cars were scrapped.

The railroad is used for railway tank car storage. Two locomotives are still on site but not in service.

Locomotives No. 33 and 115 are currently advertised for sale on the Sterling Rail website. They are stored out of view on the northwest side of the Crowe Transportation Services facility in the industrial park at 2388 North Market Street, Elizabethtown, PA 17022. No. 919 is leased to Lancaster Propane Gas, 55 Maibach Lane, Mount Joy, PA 17552.
