= Oil Creek Railroad =

Railroad

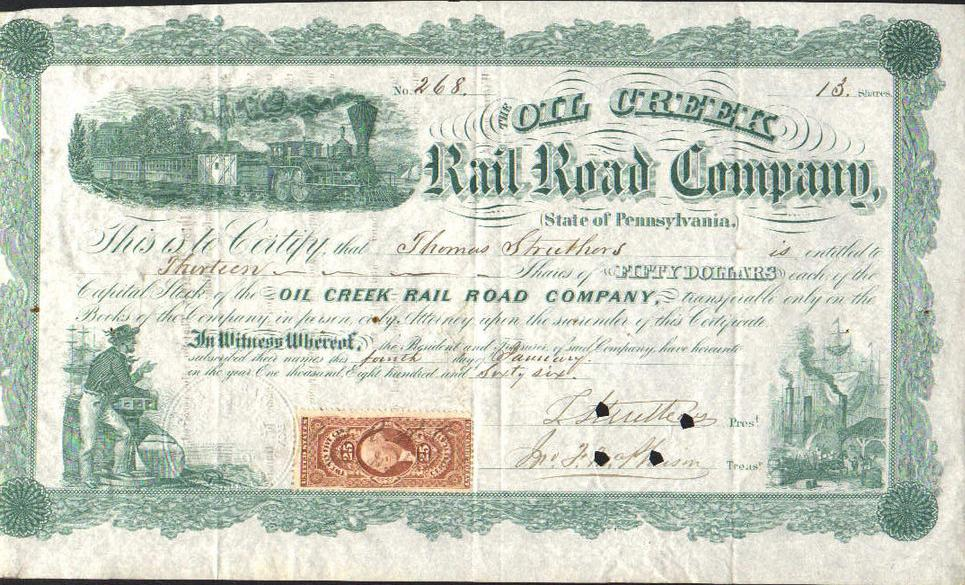
Oil Creek Railroad Company stock certificate

The Oil Creek Railroad Company (OCRR) was a railroad in western Pennsylvania.

The company was chartered on August 17, 1860, by railroad investor Thomas Struthers of Warren, Pennsylvania, and several other Warren businessmen. The charter authorized the construction of a railroad from any point on the Philadelphia and Erie Railroad to Titusville, Pennsylvania, along the Oil Creek to Oil City and Franklin. The largest individual stockholder was Dr. Worthy S. Streator of Cleveland, Ohio.

The OCRR first connected to Titusville in 1862, then Miller Farm in 1863, and Shaffer Farm in 1864. From 1864 to 1865, the OCRR's primary function was to transport oil from the oil-producing regions of Pennsylvania to the Atlantic and Great Western Railroad in Corry, Pennsylvania. In 1865, 4 ft 8 1/2 in (1,435 mm) standard gauge was added to the OCRR's 6 ft (1,829 mm) gauge so that it could connect to standard gauge railroads like the Philadelphia and Erie.

In 1866, the OCRR was extended to the Farmers Railroad in Petroleum Centre in order for oil to be moved from the Oil Creek valley region to either Corry in the north or to Oil City in the south. At this, its greatest extent, the OCRR ran 37 miles from Corry, Pennsylvania, to Petroleum Centre, Pennsylvania.

The OCRR existed independently until 1868 when it was purchased by the Warren and Franklin Railway and combined with other short line oil transporting railroads in western Pennsylvania to form the Oil Creek and Allegheny River Railway.
