= Pine Grove Railroad Station =

Historic station in Pennsylvania

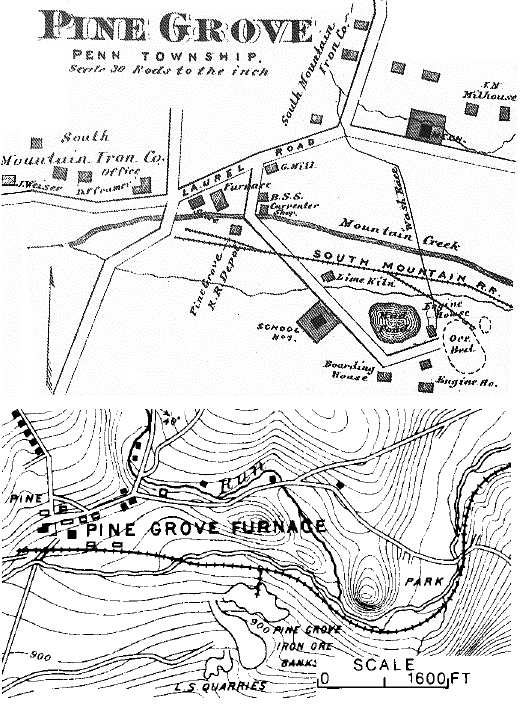
1872 (top) & 1889 maps show the railroad terminus south of the "Mountain Creek" water race channel, while the natural creek flow through the topographic swale was south of the depot and flowed eastward under the RR bridge. The station was at 40.0300°N 77.3055°W.

The Pine Grove Railroad Station was the end of the line for the 1870 South Mountain Railroad, which transported materials from limestone pits and three operating ore mines for the Pine Grove Iron Works. The station had a roundhouse and, by 1872, a depot with siding (the 1877 South Mountain Railway and Mining Company's plan for an 1880 westward rail extension to an ore bed was never built.) "Pine Grove" was listed on the Gettysburg and Harrisburg Railroad's passenger schedule of April 21, 1884; and the SMRR railroad offices and repair shops (Jno. H. Christman, Master Mechanic) were transferred to the 1891 Hunter's Run and Slate Belt Railroad with the station servicing the 1892 Fuller Brick and Slate Company south of the tracks (iron works production ended in 1895.) Despite a 1902 forest fire in the area that destroyed buildings, both "Pine Grove Furnace" and "Pine Grove Park" were listed as 1904 HR & SB RR railway stations, and in 1912 new Reading Company track was laid to Pine Grove on "the former Hunters Run and Slate Belt Line". The Pine Grove area was sold to the Commonwealth of Pennsylvania in 1913, the tracks and ties have been removed, and the station area is part of the Pine Grove Furnace State Park.
