= Cumberland County Biker/Hiker Trail =

Rail trail in Pennsylvania, US

Location	Pine Grove Furnace State Park, Gardners, PA
Length	2.2 miles
Use	Hiking, walking, biking
Difficulty	Easy, level, handicap accessible
Surface	Asphalt, cinder, crushed stone
Hours	Dawn to dusk, year-around
Amenities	Benches, picnic facilities, campgrounds, beaches
Bathrooms	Furnace Stack Day Use Area, Fuller Lake Area, Laurel Forge Pond Day Use Area

Cumberland County Biker/Hiker Trail
Intersection	Coordinates
W terminus @ T339	40.0314°N 77.3053°W
Mountain Cr br @ Fuller L	40.0308°N 77.2978°W
W end of RR bed	
trailhead for Swamp Trail	
S end of Ice House Rd	
Appalachian Trail branches E	40.0317°N 77.2903°W
E turn from Old RR Bed Rd	(trail exits state park)
crossing: Ice Cutters Rd	

The Cumberland County Biker/Hiker Trail is a Pennsylvania rail trail at Pine Grove Furnace State Park and is almost entirely on the "Old Railroad Bed Road" between Fuller Lake and Laurel Lake. The trail is a pleasant 2.2 miles within the Pine Grove Furnace State Park located in the Michaux State Forest. The park is home to many species of wildlife and is a common attraction for locals and tourists alike. Walking, hiking, and biking are the opportunities offered by the trail year round. The biker/hiker trail shares roughly half of its trail with the Appalachian Trail and is a very popular route within the State Park.

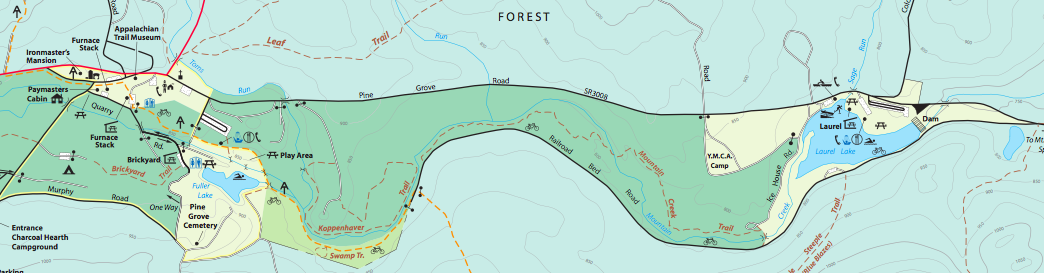
Map of Pine Grove Furnace State Park. The Cumberland County Biker/Hiker Trail is represented by a bicycle and can be found partially on the Appalachian Trail.

== Historical development ==
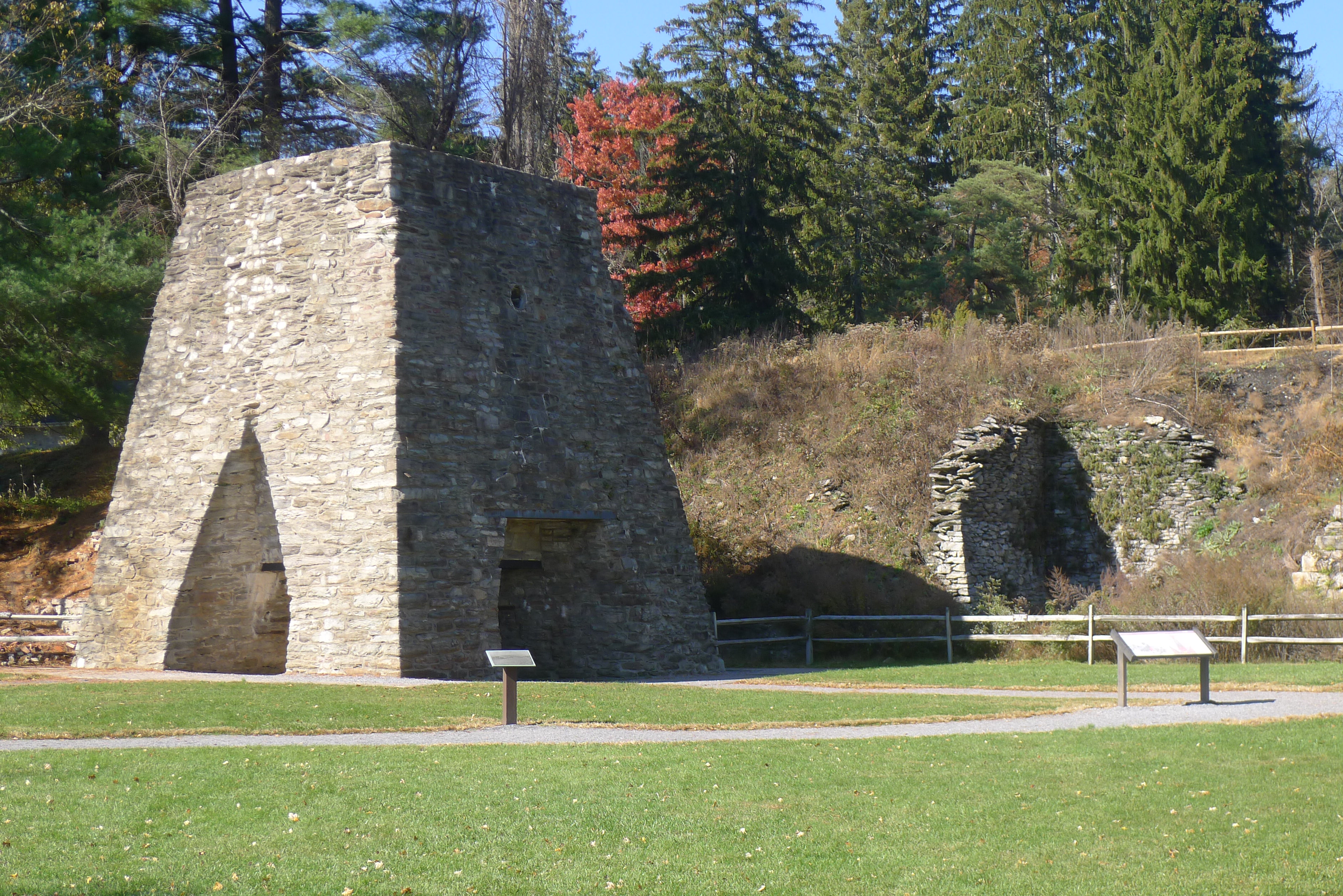
Furnace Stack Area located in Pine Grove Furnace State Park

=== Historical significance ===
Pine Grove Furnace State Park was home to the Pine Grove Furnace that ceased operations in 1895. Pine Grove Furnace began operations in 1764 to take advantage of the rich iron core deposits in the area. South Mountain Ironworks, as it was formerly known, along with its 17,000 acre property was sold to the State of Pennsylvania in 1914. The Cumberland County Biker/Hiker Trail lies on the former bed of the South Mountain Railroad where remnant of its rich history can still be found in the Park today.

== Trail development ==
=== Design and construction ===
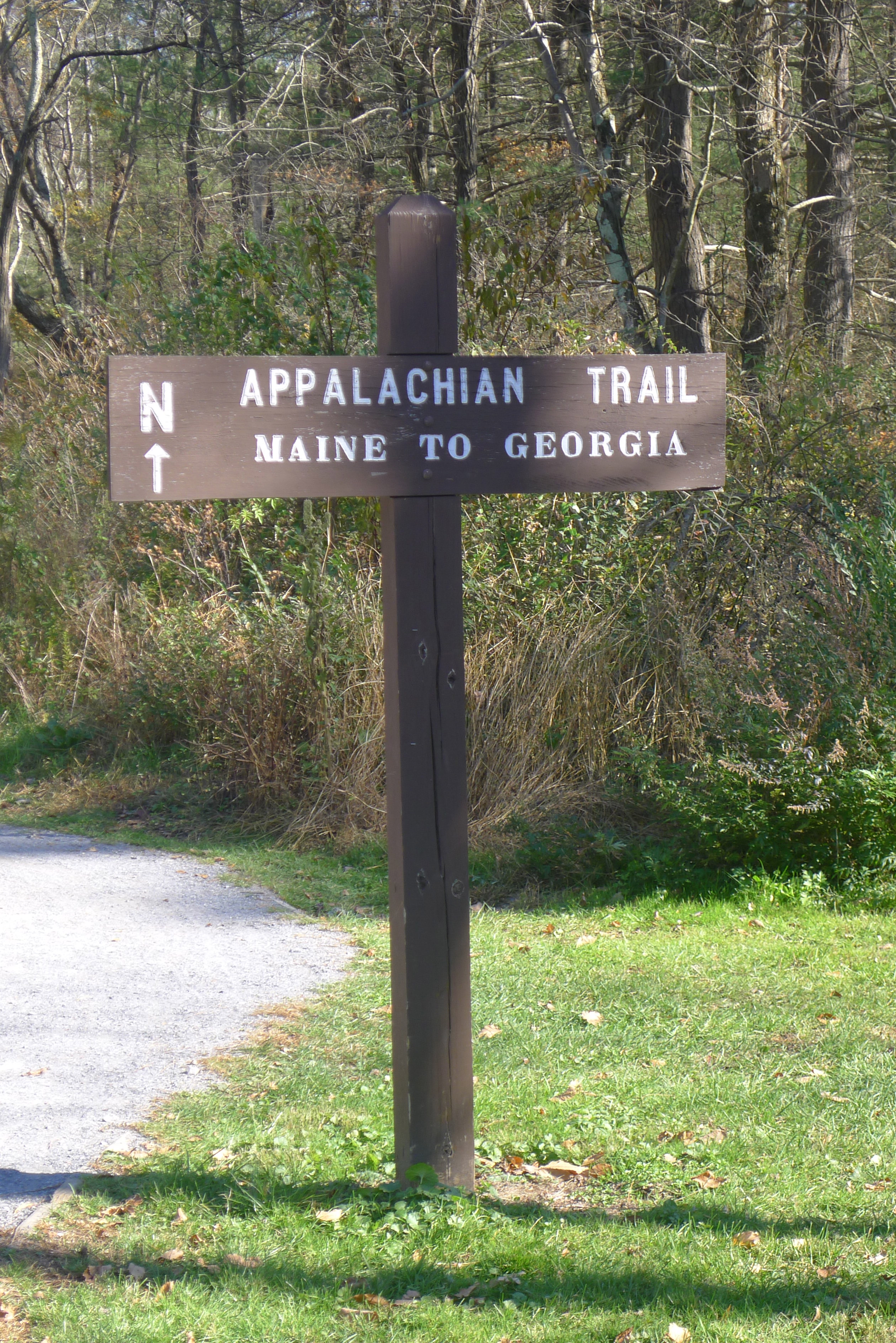
An Appalachian Trail sign marks the start of the Cumberland County Biker/Hiker Trail

The majority of the Cumberland County Biker/Hiker Trail is well paved and is made from asphalt and cinder. The trail begins with a paved path to the Fuller Lake Day Use Area where it then turns to crushed stone and moves on towards Laurel Forge Pond. The trail is wheelchair accessible and is completely level. Many small crevices, paths, and streams run parallel or form from the trail allowing travelers short diversions or resting areas along the trail. Following the Cumberland County Biker/Hiker Trail split from the Appalachian Trail, the Biker/Hiker trail returns to asphalt and continues on to Laurel Forge Pond.

=== Trailheads ===
The recommended access point is the Furnace Stack Day Use Area Trailhead located off of Quarry Road. This area provides ample parking and clear access to the Cumberland County Biker/Hiker trail by way of the Appalachian Trail. Continue to follow the trail from the Furnace Stack Day Use Area through the Laurel Forge Pond Day Use Area by way of Old Railroad Bed Road and you will come to the trail end at Pine Grove Road.

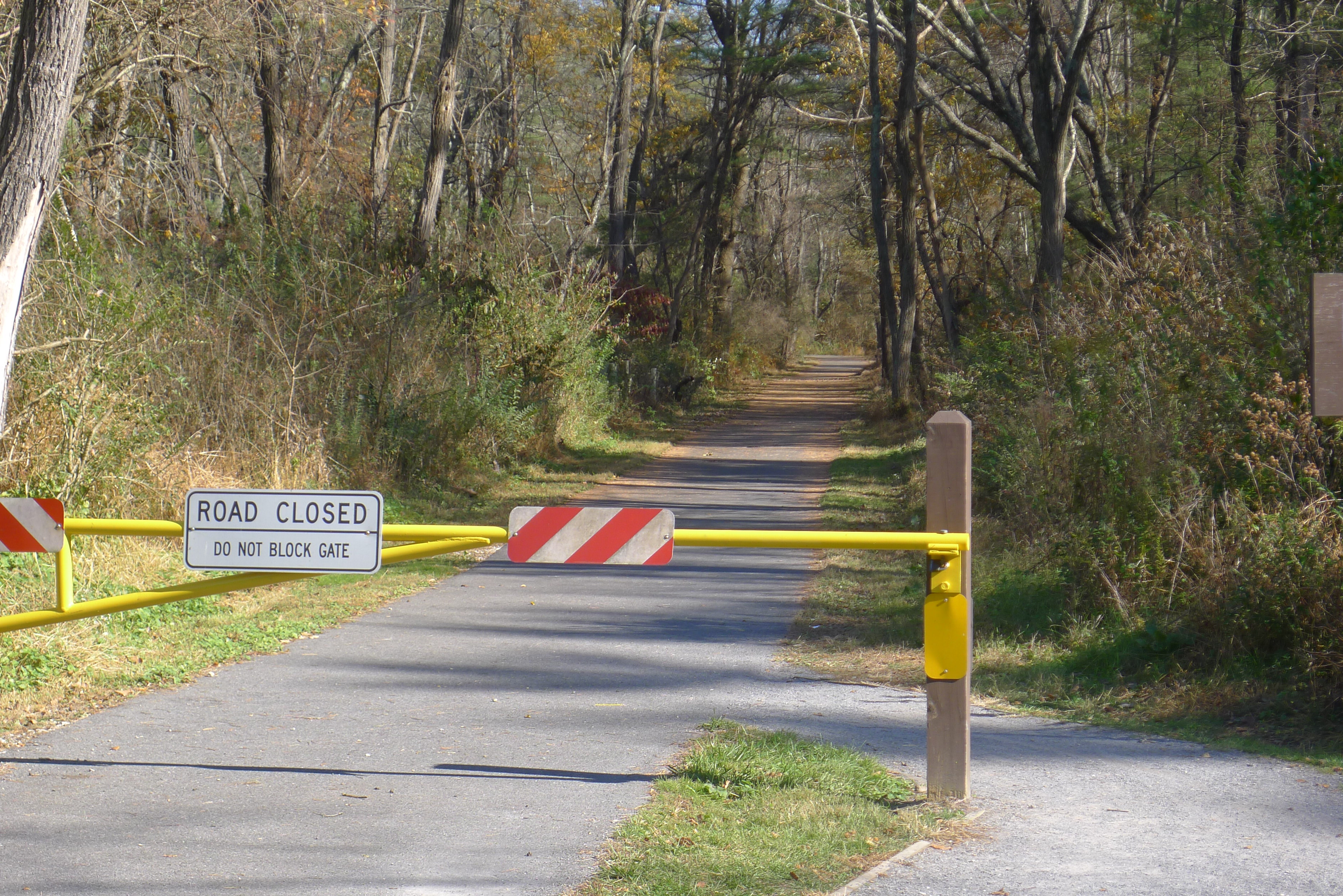
For roughly one mile, the Appalachian Trail and the Cumberland County Biker/Hiker Trail are one and the same.

=== Trail amenities ===
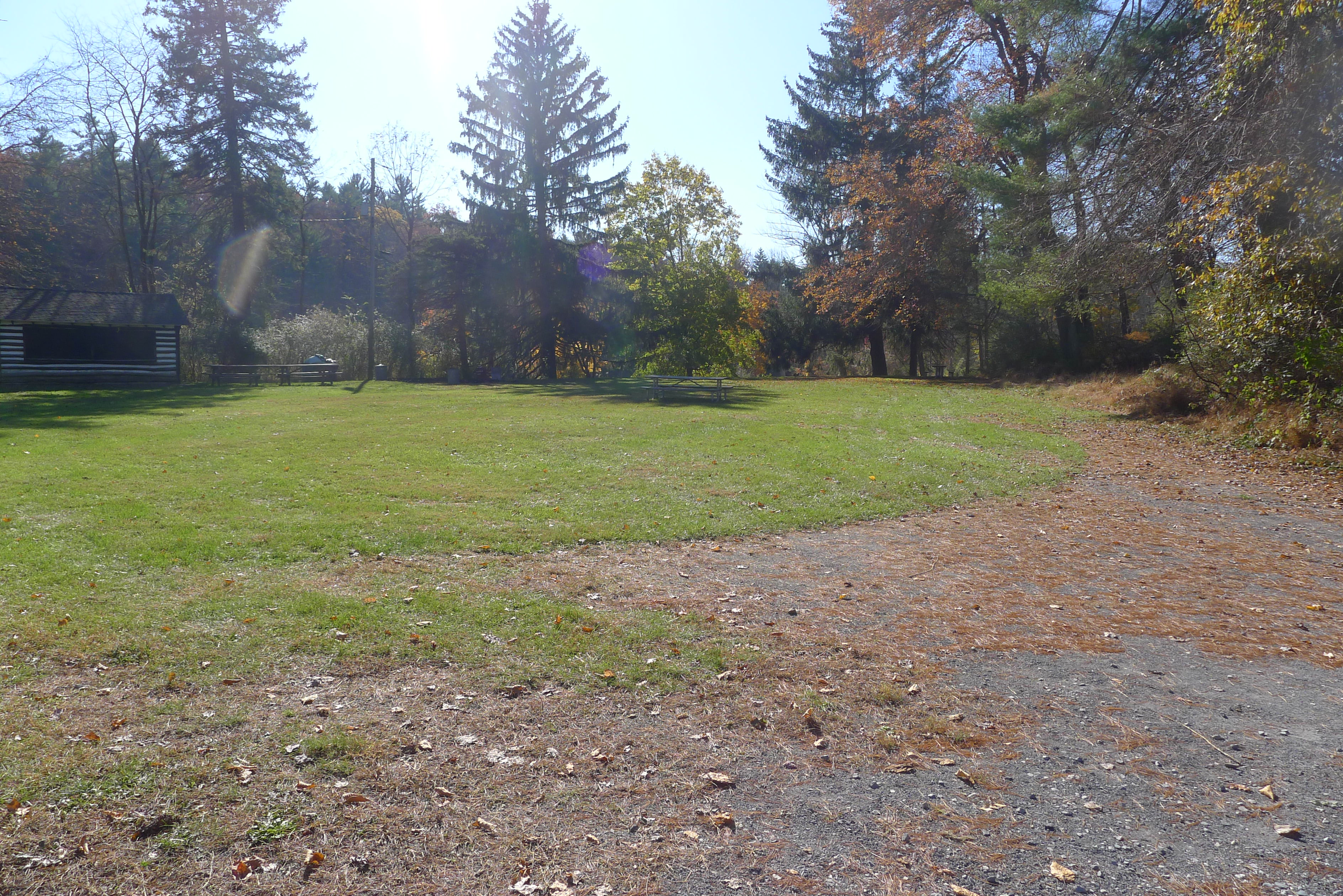
One of the campgrounds at Pine Grove Furnace State Park right along the Biker/Hiker Trail

Ample parking, restroom facilities, and picnic areas are located in the Fuller Lake and Laurel Forge Pond day use area as well as at the Pine Grove Furnace State Park and Appalachian Trail Museum locations. All restrooms and facilities are recently renovated and extremely well maintained. The trail passes right by Fuller Lake and Laurel Forge Pond where users can swim, boat, fish, relax on the beach, or take a seat on the waterside benches. There are multiple campgrounds located near each the Lake and Pond as well as multiple picnic areas.

== Community ==
=== Trail supporters ===
The Cumberland County Biker/Hiker Trail is maintained by the Pine Grove Furnace State Park. Pine Grove Furnace State Park lies within the Michaux State Forest, which falls under the responsibility of the Pennsylvania Department of Conservation and Natural Resources. Among other duties, the DCNR is responsible for the 120 state parks and 2.2 million acres of state forests within Pennsylvania. Their mission is to conserve and sustain Pennsylvania’s natural resources for present and future generations. In addition to state and federal funding, the following local communities and organizations have provided funding and in-kind support for the Cumberland County Biker/Hiker Trail:

- Friends of Pine Grove Furnace State Park
- Cumberland Valley A.T. Club
- Pennsylvania Department of Conservation and Natural Resources
- Pine Grove Furnace State Park

=== Special events ===
Each fall, Pine Grove Furnace State Park holds the Fall Furnace Fest at Fuller Lake located right along the Biker/Hiker trail. This event includes many family friendly activities such as races, pumpkin carving, apple bobbing, bond fires, and the infamous pumpkin float.
