= Gettysburg and Northern Railroad =

Short-line Railroad based in Gettysburg, Pennsylvania

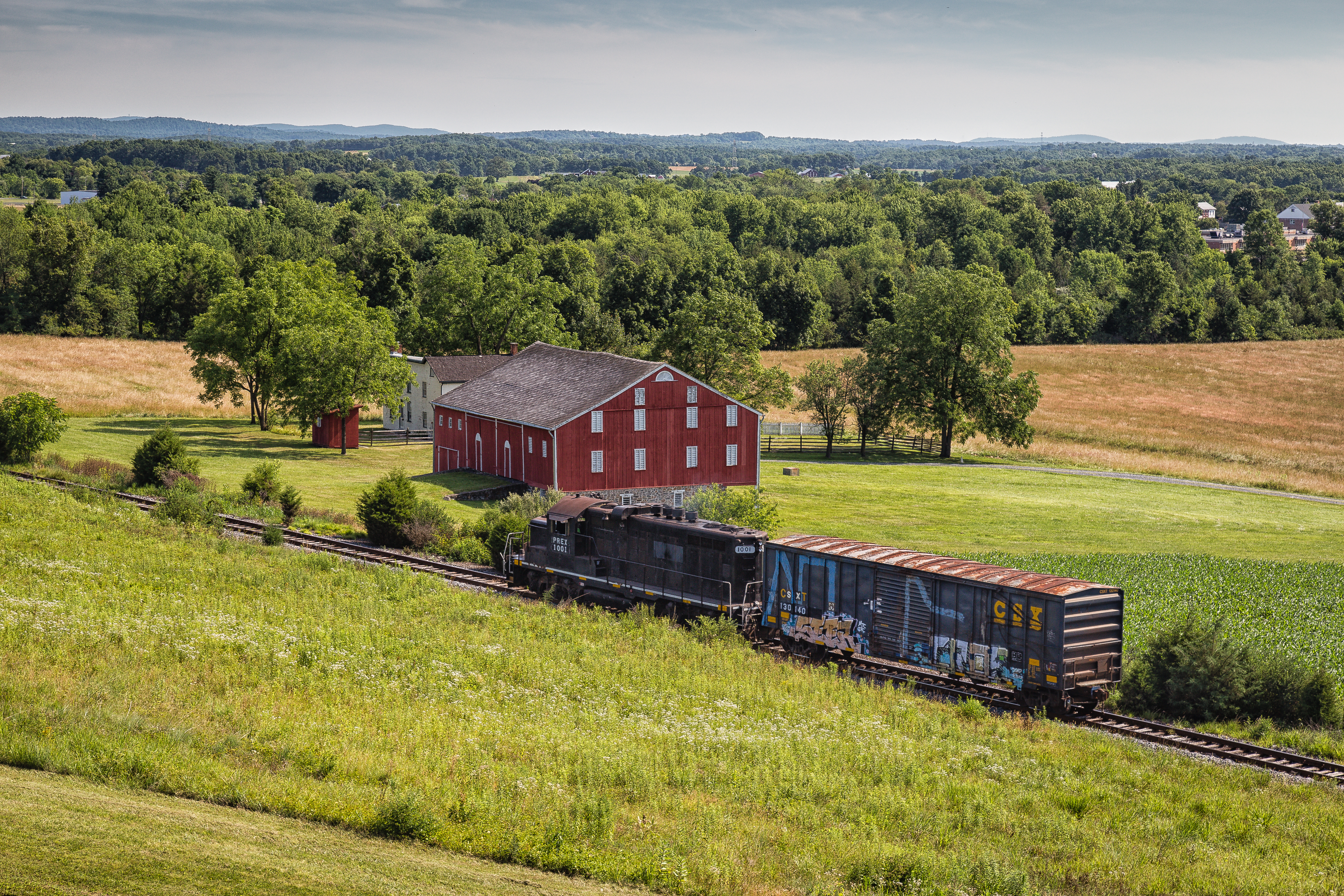
- PREX 1001 with a boxcar near Gettysburg in 2016

Overview
- Headquarters: Gettysburg, Pennsylvania
- Reporting mark: GET
- Locale: Adams and Cumberland counties in Pennsylvania
- Dates of operation: 2001–present
- Predecessor: Gettysburg Railway

Technical
- Track gauge: 4 ft 8 1/2 in (1,435 mm) standard gauge
- Length: 25 mi (40.2 km)

Other
- Website: pioneerlines.com/the-gettysburg-and-northern-railway-get/

The Gettysburg and Northern Railroad (reporting mark GET) is a short-line railroad located in the U.S. state of Pennsylvania. The railroad operates a 25-mile (40 km) long line running between Gettysburg in Adams County and Mount Holly Springs in Cumberland County.

== Operations ==
The Gettysburg and Northern Railroad operates a 25-mile (40 km) long line running from Gettysburg in Adams County north to Mount Holly Springs in Cumberland County. Between Gettysburg and Mount Holly Springs, the railroad serves Biglerville, Aspers, Gardners, Peach Glen, Hunters Run, and Upper Mill. The Gettysburg and Northern Railroad interchanges with CSX Transportation in Gettysburg and the Norfolk Southern Railway in Mount Holly Springs. Among the products carried by the railroad are canned goods, pulpboard, soda ash, grain, and scrap paper

== History ==
The railroad was built in the late 19th century and opened in 1891 as the Gettysburg and Harrisburg Railway. The line was later leased to the Reading Railroad and operated as the "Gettysburg Branch." The bankrupt Reading Railroad became part of Conrail in 1976, however the Gettysburg Branch was left out of the Conrail system. The Pennsylvania Department of Transportation took over the branch and sold the line to a new company, the Blairsville & Indiana Railroad, in 1976; this company changed its name to Gettysburg Railroad.

In 1996, the Gettysburg Railroad was sold to RailAmerica subsidiary Delaware Valley Railroad Company, which operated the line as the Gettysburg Railway. In 2001, the Gettysburg Railway was sold to Pioneer Railcorp and the Gettysburg and Northern Railroad took over operations.

Patriot Rail Company acquired Pioneer Railcorp in 2022, and in early 2024 announced that it would resume tourist excursions on the Gettysburg and Northern Railroad. Excursion service began in mid-2025, using 5 coaches and 2 dedicated locomotives.

=== Locomotive roster ===
No.	Class	Engine	Builder	Notes	Status
105	GP9	Diesel	EMD	Built as CV GP9, later moved around the Pioneer Lines network.	Off Roster
107	GP10	Diesel	EMD	Rebuilt by Conrail to GP10 specs. Later sold to Rock Island Rail	Off Roster
401	F7	Diesel	EMD	Originally BLE 726, suffered engine failure in mid 2000's, sold in 2023.	Off Roster
402	F7	Diesel	EMD	Originally CNW 406, sold in 2023	Off Roster
1000	GP10	Diesel	EMD	Ex Elkhart & Western RailRoad, Rebuilt by Illinois Central to a GP10. Built as GP9 GN 622	Active
1001	GP10	Diesel	EMD	Ex Illinois Central 8295, Built as GP9 C&O 6080	Active
1501	GP20D	Diesel	EMD		Off Roster
1751	F9A	Diesel	EMD	Ex Algoma Central, later Peoria & Western 1751, sold to BUGX	Off Roster
1755	F9A	Diesel	EMD	Ex Algoma Central, Sold to Potomac Eagle Scenic Railroad	Off Roster
1761	F9B	Diesel	EMD	Ex Algoma Central, later Peoria & Western 1761, off roster by 2022	Off Roster
1786	GP40FH-2	Diesel	EMD	Built as PC GP40 3070, rebuilt by NJT. Used on excursion service.	Active
1863	GP15	Diesel	EMD	Ex CR 1678. Used on excursion service.	Active
3833	GP38-2	Diesel	EMD	LTEX 3833, Ex NS, Built as SOU 5129	Active
