= Pine Grove Furnace =

Pine Grove Furnace may refer to:

- Pine Grove Furnace (1764), in the Pine Grove Iron Works of Cumberland County, Pennsylvania
  - Pine Grove Furnace State Park, established to protect the above
- Pine Grove Furnace (1805), near Uniontown, Pennsylvania
- Pine-Grove Furnace (1828), in Lawrence County, Ohio
- Pine Grove Bloomary Forge (1837), in Washington County, Tennessee
