= Gettysburg Railroad (disambiguation) =

There have been several railroads named Gettysburg:

- the Gettysburg Railroad, a forerunner of the Western Maryland Railroad
- the Gettysburg Railroad (1976–96), a short-line railroad
- the Gettysburg Railway, a short-line railroad
- the Gettysburg Electric Railway, an interurban
