= Pine Grove Iron Works =

- U.S. National Register of Historic Places
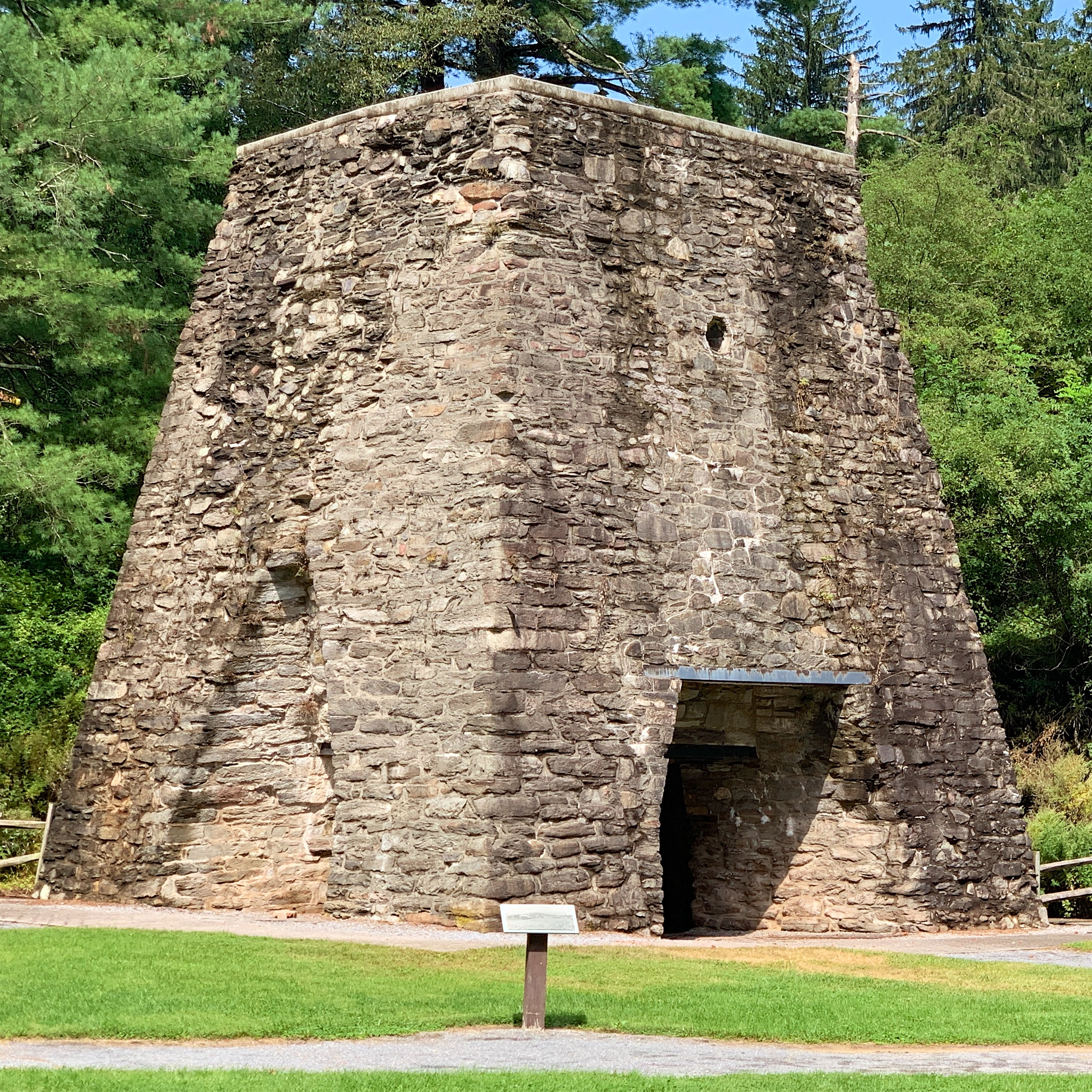
- Furnace in 2019
- Location: Mountain Creek, Pennsylvania, U.S.
- Nearest city: Cooke, Pennsylvania, U.S.
- Coordinates: 40°01′52″N 77°18′24″W
- Area: 188 acres (76 ha)
- Built: 1764
- Architectural style: Italianate
- NRHP reference No.: 77001158
- Added to NRHP: April 13, 1977

The Pine Grove Iron Works was a smelting facility in southcentral Pennsylvania during the Industrial Revolution. The works is notable for remaining structures that are historical visitor attractions of Pine Grove Furnace State Park, including the furnace stack of the Pine Grove Furnace. The site was listed on the National Register of Historic Places on April 13, 1977 for its significance in architecture and industry. It includes seven contributing buildings, two structures, fourteen sites, and two objects.

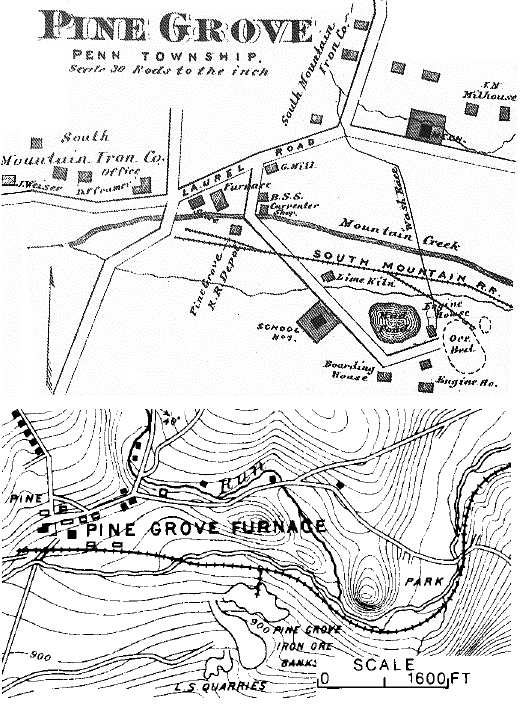
1872 (top) & 1889 maps show the ore pits and railroad terminus. The "Mountain Creek" water race channel was north of the RR, while the creek through the topographic swale was south of the RR and flowed eastward under the RR bridge. The station was at 40.0300°N 77.3055°W.

Owners

c. 1930: PA Bureau of State Parks
1913: PA Department of Forestry
1877: S Mountain Mining & Iron Co
tbd: South Mountain Iron Company
c. 1874: Thomas Iron Company
1864: South Mountain Iron Company
1864: Morehead
1863: Jay Cooke & Co
1845: E. Watts & W. Watts
1838: F. Watts & Penrose
1835: J. Ege & M. P. Ege
1815: P. Ege
1803: M. Ege
1788: Arthur, M. Ege & T. Thornburg
1783: M. Ege, J. Thornburg & T. Thornburg
1773: Simon
1772: McGrew
1762: Stevenson
1762 (137 acres): Pope
1736: Thomas Penn and Richard Penn

== Geography ==
The works occupied the small area around the furnace stack a "quarter of a mile from the" quarry. Notable geographic points near the works include the Mountain Creek distributary point for the furnace water race on the west, the wash race distributary point from Tom's Run (north), and the confluence of the furnace's water race with the creek (east). Also to the east and southeast were the railroad bridge over the creek and the "east workings" with the limestone quarry ("flux ... pit 250'x75'x50' deep" in 1891) and Pine Grove bank No. 1.

=== Pine Grove ===
Pine Grove was the village/town associated with the iron works (designated the "Pine Grove Furnace" populated place in 1979), and village structures included the Methodist Episcopal Church and residences north of the east-west road through the area. By 1886 the village had a post office, and the schoolhouse and c. 1790 Pine Grove Cemetery (40.02804°N 77.29983°W) were south of the village and the iron works. A local store provide goods.

== History ==
Pine Grove Furnace was built about 1770, the second of nine Cumberland County furnaces. It was built and operated by Robert Thornburg and John Arthur, in the interest of George Stevenson, who already owned Laurel Forge downstream on Mountain Creek. The furnace smelted iron ore to produce colonial cast iron products such as wagon wheel iron, fireplace backs, iron kettles, ten plate stoves, and in the late 19th century, Baldwin Locomotive parts.

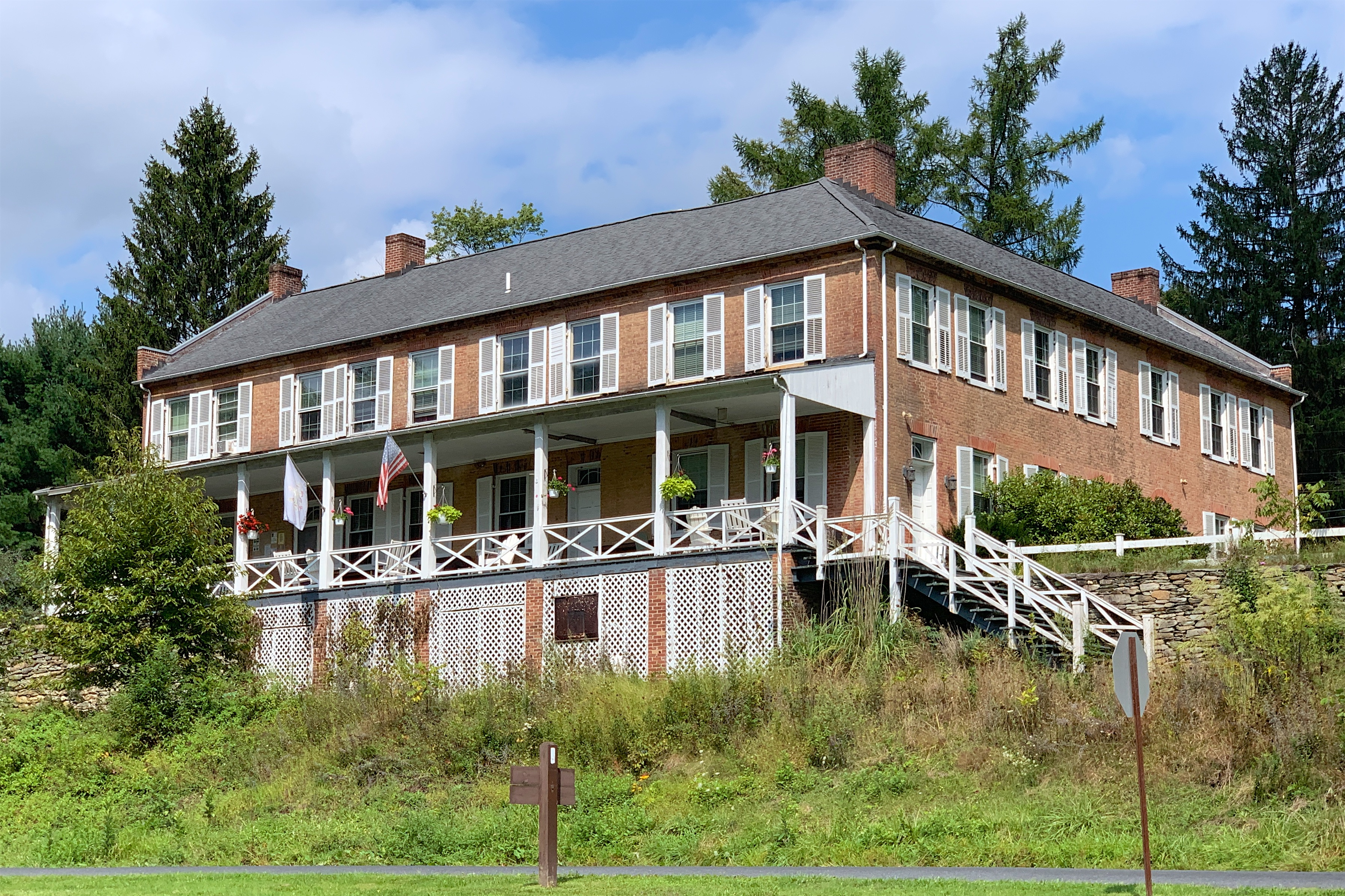
Ironmaster's Mansion, the Ege Mansion

The Pine Grove Furnace facilities were identified as "Pine Grove Iron-Works" by 1782 ("Mr. Eger's [sic] iron-works" in 1783), and in addition to water raceways and charcoal hearths (traces of which are still visible), support facilities were built near the works, e.g., the 1829 L-shaped iron master mansion (named "office" in 1872). A saw mill was built c. 1777, and the Pine Grove No. 1 bank was used for limonite iron ore while two quarries provided limestone. The 1870 South Mountain RR, with offices at Pine Grove, connected the furnace to limestone pits and three operating ore mines.

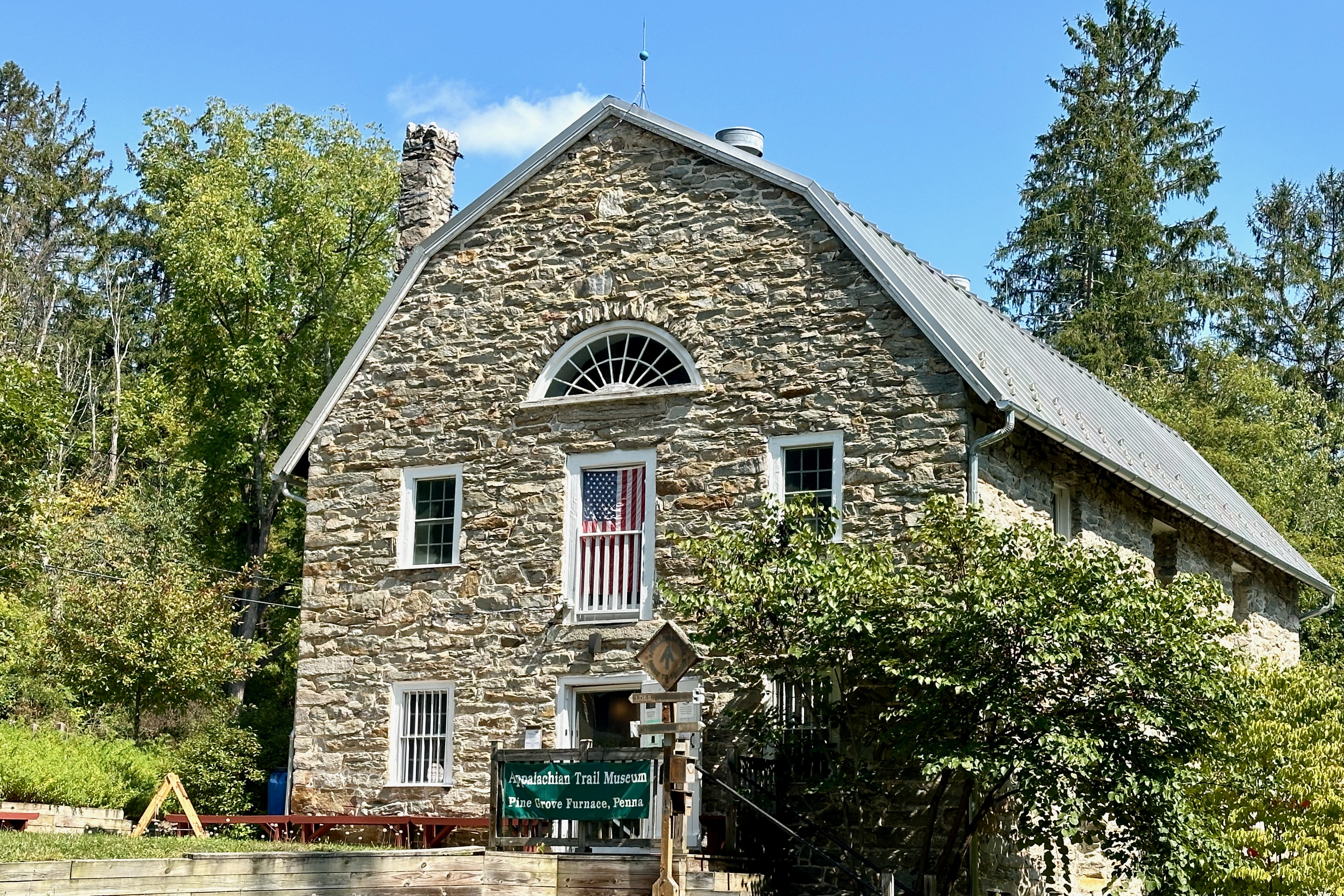
Former grist mill, now used as the Appalachian Trail Museum

The charcoal-fired furnace was deactivated in 1874, and the engine house(s) continued pumping the ore pit (now Fuller Lake) to keep reduced water levels. The cold blast furnace had been converted to hot blast by 1877, and remodelling in the 1877-8 winter including changes to allow alternate fuels. Connellsville coke was first used on March 22/23, 1879; and anthracite was first used shortly afterward. A rail extension to the Wild Cat pits, 2.5 miles west of Pine Grove, was considered in 1880 but not completed. Net iron output in the peak year of 1883 was 6,000 short tons (5,400 t). The SMRR-succeeding 1891 Hunter's Run and Slate Belt Railroad and 1910 Gettysburg and Harrisburg Railway operated to the Pine Grove Railroad Station and the nearby Pine Grove Park.

Iron production ended in 1895, and the Pine Grove Iron Works was sold on September 12, 1913, as part of 3 tracts which became the majority of the Pine Grove Division of the South Mountain Forest and, by 1931, the Pine Grove Furnace State Park.

The ownership chain of the Pine Grove Iron Works was published in 1886, and a history by one of the superintendents was published in 1934. The Ironmaster's Mansion was restored by 1985 and renovated from 2010 until April 5, 2011. In 1991, Railroads to Pine Grove Furnace was published.
