= Carlisle Junction =

Carlisle Junction may refer to:

- South Mountain Junction, an 1870 branch point on the Cumberland Valley Railroad east of Carlisle, Pennsylvania ("Gettysburg Junction" after 1884) which the connecting South Mountain RR identified on schedules as "Carlisle Junction".
- Carlisle Junction, the 1891 Philadelphia, Harrisburg and Pittsburg Railroad crossing of the 1870 South Mountain RR near Mt. Holly Springs and south of Gettysburg Junction.
