= South Mountain Iron Company =

The South Mountain Iron Company was the owner of the Pine Grove Furnace in Cumberland County, Pennsylvania, along South Mountain after the 1864 $1,500,000 (~$23.8 million in 2023) purchase from Jay Cooke & Company. In 1877 the company was split into separate mining and railway companies, with the latter South Mountain Railway and Mining Company establishing the 1884 South Mountain Railroad between the Pine Grove Iron Works and the Cumberland Valley Railroad's Carlisle Junction then being purchased by the 1891 Gettysburg and Harrisburg Railway company. The real estate of the 1877 South Mountain Mining and Iron Company is now the Pine Grove Furnace State Park and Michaux State Forest after being sold to the Pennsylvania Department of Forestry in 1912-3.
