= Toland, Pennsylvania =

Unincorporated community in Pennsylvania, U.S.

Coordinates: 40°04′11″N 77°12′43″W

Toland is a small village and unincorporated community located in Cumberland County and the South Mountain Range, in south−central Pennsylvania.

Less than 50 people reside in the close-knit community.

== Geography ==
Toland has a mailing address of Gardners, Pennsylvania, because the size of the community does not warrant a post office, nor a census designated place name.

The very small village, less than 0.25 miles (0.40 km) long, is located on Pine Grove Road, east of Mountain Creek Campground.

The closest town is Mount Holly Springs located 3 miles (4.8 km) to the north, where most residents drive to for supplies.

The village is roughly 10 miles (16 km) south of Carlisle and 15 miles (24 km) north of Gettysburg; and 7 miles (11 km) southeast of Boiling Springs.

== History ==
Toland was built for the clay bank company workers in the first quarter of the 20th century.

The original community of Toland consisted of 11 duplex houses, built side by side along Pine Grove Road, with less than 0.17 of an acre of land to each. Additional homes have been built since. When the community was originally built there was only a common well with a hand pump for all of the families to draw from.

What is now a sand pit operation was originally a clay bank mining operation that was the reason for the location of the village of Toland.

== Features ==
The Michaux State Forest surrounds the village. Pine Grove Furnace State Park, Laurel Lake, and Fuller Lake are located a few miles to the west, near the intersection of Pine Grove Road and Pennsylvania Route 233.

It is located less than 0.5 miles (0.80 km) from the Pine Grove Road crossing of the Appalachian Trail.

The only business in Toland is the Cherokee Campground, formerly known as the Tagg Run Campground. The campground's Tagg Run restaurant has closed.

Toland Mission is a small non-denominational church that can hold up to 74 persons. It was originally built in Carlisle, by the owner of Beetem Lumber Company, for the families of the community of Toland.

A one-room school house near the church originally served the community, but it was converted to a home when residents' children were transported to a township school.

== See also ==
- South Mountain Range (Maryland−Pennsylvania)
- Unincorporated communities in Cumberland County, Pennsylvania
