= Fuller Lake =

Lake in Pennsylvania, United States

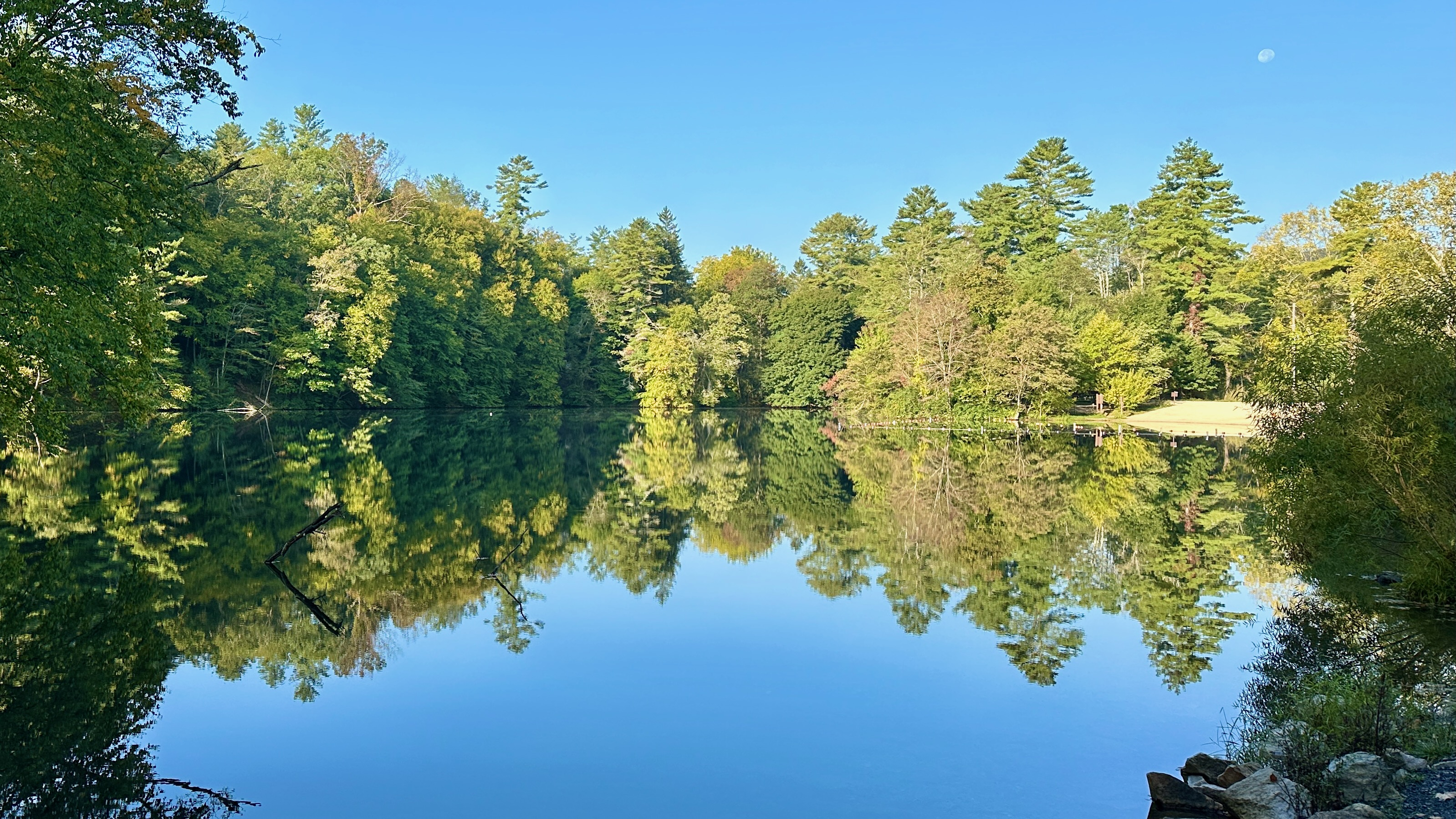

- Location within Pennsylvania
- Location: Cumberland County, Pennsylvania
- Coordinates: 40.03°N 77.299444°W
- Type: body of water
- Surface area: 1.7 acres (0.0069 km^{2})

Fuller Lake is the body of water with 1.7 acres (0.0069 km^{2}) of surface area in the former Pine Grove Quarry in Cooke Township, Cumberland County, south-central Pennsylvania.

It is within Pine Grove Furnace State Park and the Michaux State Forest, near the community of Toland. The state park is in the South Mountain Range of the northern Blue Ridge Mountains System.

During the period of iron ore excavation when the pit depth had sufficiently increased, mountain springs that filled the quarry required pumping.

== Recreation ==
Present day inflow maintains a low water temperature for swimming. A beach was added in the 20th century. In 1965, Fuller Lake was closed due to contamination, and was later reopened.

The lake's lifeguards were eliminated for the 2008 season, but were restored in 2009, following the drowning of a teenager in July 2008.

== See also ==
- List of lakes in Pennsylvania
- Tourist attractions in Cumberland County, Pennsylvania
