= Laurel Lake (Cumberland County, Pennsylvania) =

Body of water in Pennsylvania, U.S.

- Laurel Forge Pond
- Location within Pennsylvania Location within the United States
- Location: Cumberland County, Pennsylvania
- Coordinates: 40.0395281°N 77.2702377°W

Laurel Lake—also known as Laurel Forge Pond—is a water body with recreation area at Pine Grove Furnace State Park. It is located in the eastern part of Cooke Township, Cumberland County.

== History ==
The lake was created for supplying a water race to Laurel Forge by an 1830 dam on Mountain Creek. In 1855 and again in 1889, the downstream Upper Mill dam (now Eaton-Dikeman mill) was breached by downwash when the Laurel Forge breached.

In 1919, the Laurel Dam breached and washed out the Hunters Run and Slate Belt branch and breached the Upper Mill dam at Mount Holly.

The lake was a popular camp location. The Camp Rothrock Boy Scout facility in the area, with wooden shelters and a dining room, used Laurel Lake's beaches in 1922. In 1921, "Laurel Lake Park" was one of 26 camps built by the Civilian Conservation Corps and maintained by the state for camping tourists, and the public camp was still going strong in 1923. By 1929, the Gettysburg Academy conducted week-end camps at Laurel Dam. (A dam repair was performed in 1929.) Camp Lion was at the Laurel Dam in 1933.

In 1947, sand was added to the lake's beach. Gettysburg College used the park for football camp in both 1941 (at the 1941 Carlisle YMCA Camp site) and in 1947. Camp Thompson was at the lake in 1949 and 1953.

A fire burned 7 acres near the lake in 1963. In 1965 the lake was closed due to contamination and subsequently re-opened.

In 1979 the Laurel Forge Pond name was designated in the USGS's Geographic Names Information System (GNIS) as feature 1178931, 40°02′22″N 77°16′09″W). Laurel Lake was so named in 1990 (1194510, 40°02′22″N 77°16′13″W).

The lake was drained for repairs in November 1994 and then re-opened. The lake and dam underwent reconditioning in 2006–2007.

Laurel Lake is now part of Pine Grove Furnace State Park, one of Pennsylvania's state parks.

== See also ==
- List of lakes in Pennsylvania
