= Hunter's Run and Slate Belt Railroad =

Railway line

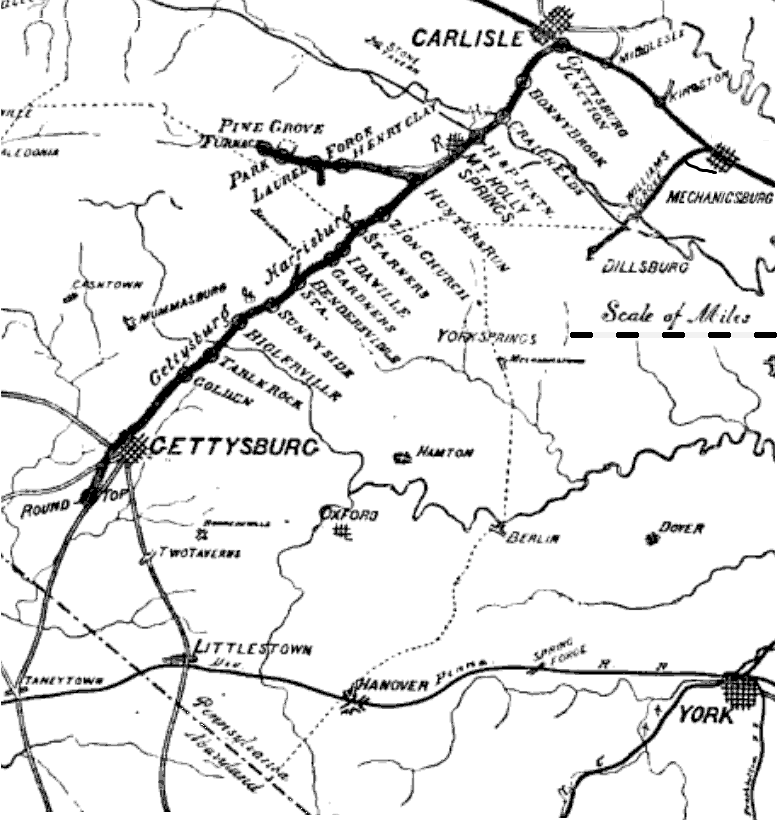
- The HJ & SB RR connected to the Gettysburg and Harrisburg at the Hunter's Run junction.

Overview
- Locale: Mountain Creek valley

History
- Opened: 1891

Technical
- Track length: 13.5 mi (21.7 km)
- Track gauge: 4 ft 8 1/2 in (1,435 mm)

The Hunter's Run and Slate Belt Railroad was a railway line from the Hunter's Run junction of the Gettysburg and Harrisburg Railway that ran southwestward along the south side of Mountain Creek to the Pine Grove Iron Works. The line serviced facilities for mining (e.g., Henry Clay iron mine), for manufacturing (Crane's Siding clay refining plant), and for recreation (Pine Grove Park for excursions). Portions of the railbed are a section of the Appalachian Trail as well as the majority of the Cumberland County Biker/Hiker Trail and the entire "Old Railroad Bed Road" that is the southeast border of Pine Grove Furnace State Park.

== History ==
The "Hunter's Run and Slate Belt R.R. Co." was incorporated on June 8, 1891, to build from Pine Grove Furnace to "Old Slate Quarry," in Adams County. The railway line leased the former South Mountain Railroad tracks between Hunters Run and Pine Grove Furnace from the South Mountain Railway and Mining Company on July 13, 1891. The extension to Slate Belt, Pennsylvania, of 5.12 miles (8.24 km) opened on June 15, 1892.

The railway line supported the 1892 Fuller Brick and Slate Company and by 1893, the company was based in the railroad offices and repair shops at Pine Grove Furnace. In February 1904, the railroad operated 2 locomotives and 3 passenger cars.

The Gettysburg and Harrisburg Railway took over the Hunter's Run and Slate Belt Railroad on October 31, 1910.
