= Cooke Township, Cumberland County, Pennsylvania =

Township in Pennsylvania, US

Coordinates: 40°03′00″N 77°17′59″W

Cooke Township, Pennsylvania
- Township
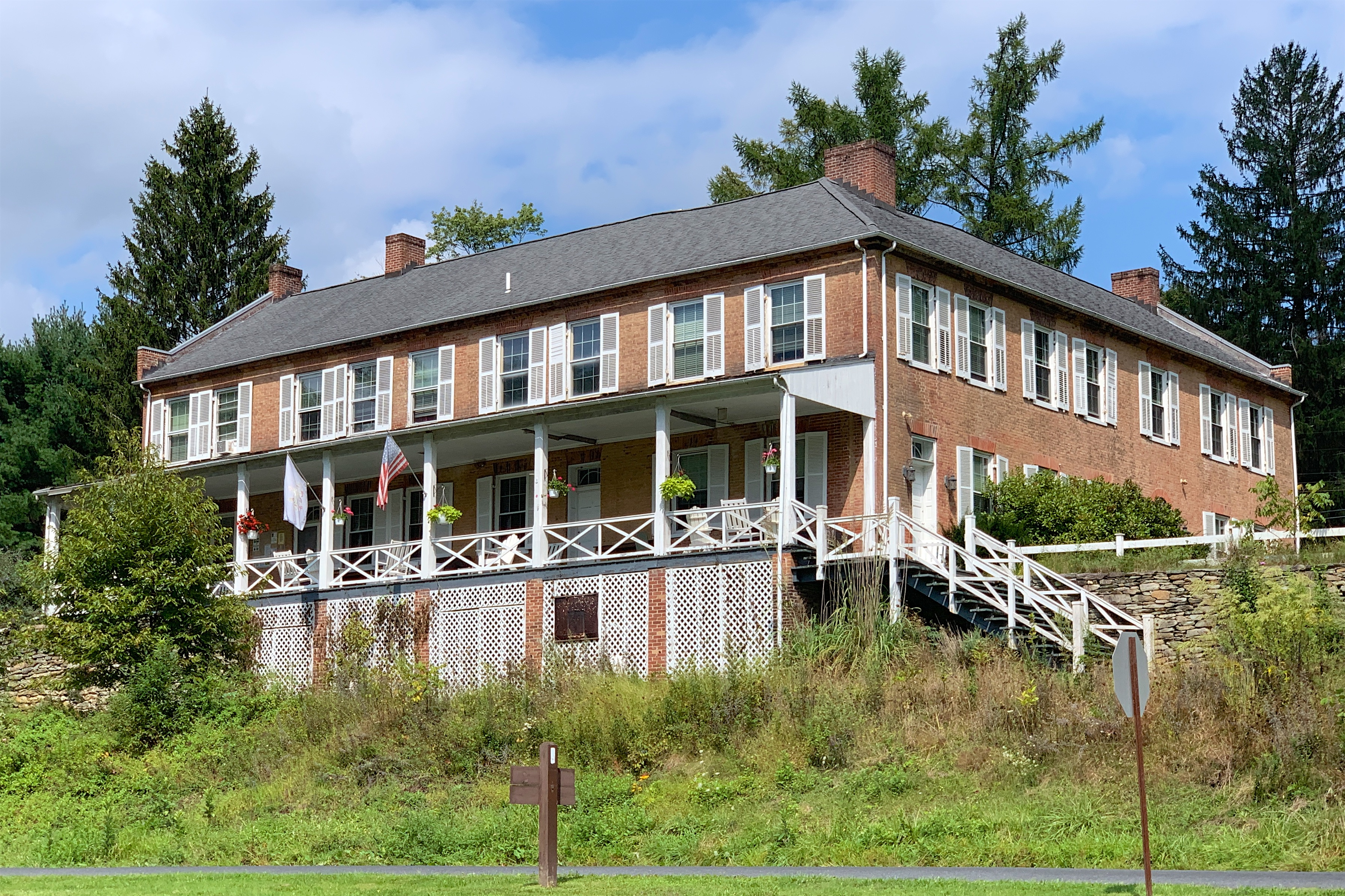
- Ironmaster's Mansion, Pine Grove Furnace State Park

- Logo

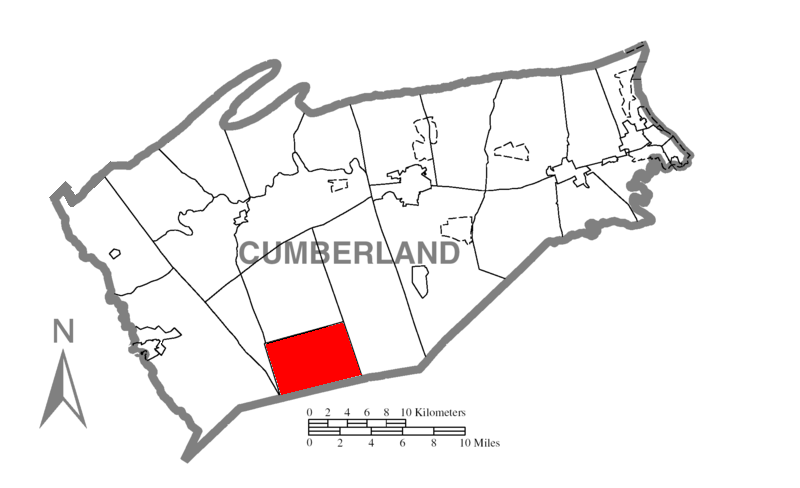
- Map of Cumberland County, Pennsylvania highlighting Cooke Township

- Map of Cumberland County, Pennsylvania
- Country: United States
- State: Pennsylvania
- County: Cumberland

Government
  - Type: Board of Supervisors

Area
  - Total: 19.86 sq mi (51.44 km^{2})
  - Land: 19.79 sq mi (51.25 km^{2})
  - Water: 0.077 sq mi (0.20 km^{2})

Population (2020)
  - Total: 202 ▲
  - Estimate (2023): 203
  - Density: 9.4/sq mi (3.63/km^{2})
- Time zone: UTC-5 (Eastern (EST))
  - Summer (DST): UTC-4 (EDT)
- Area code: 717
- FIPS code: 42-041-15920
- Website: cooketwp.org

Historical population
Census	Pop.	Note	%±
2000	117		—
2010	179		53.0%
2020	202		12.8%
2023 (est.)	203		0.5%
U.S. Decennial Census

Cooke Township is a township in Cumberland County, Pennsylvania, United States. The population was 202 at the 2020 census, up from 117 at the 2000 census.

== Geography ==
The township is located in southwestern Cumberland County, bordered to the south by Adams County. The entire township is situated within the South Mountain range of southern Pennsylvania. South Mountain proper forms a ridge the crosses the northern part of the township, while Piney Mountain runs parallel to it along the southern edge of the township. Between the two ridges is the valley of Mountain Creek, which flows northeast to Mount Holly Springs and is a tributary of Yellow Breeches Creek, which in turn flows to the Susquehanna River. Pine Grove Furnace State Park is located in the center of the township along Mountain Creek. The Appalachian Trail crosses the township, passing through the state park.

According to the United States Census Bureau, the township has a total area of 19.8 square miles (51.4 km^{2}), of which 19.8 square miles (51.2 km^{2}) is land and 0.1 square miles (0.2 km^{2}), or 0.38%, is water.

== Demographics ==
As of the census of 2000, there were 117 people, 50 households, and 42 families residing in the township. The population density was 5.9 people per square mile (2.3 people/km^{2}). There were 67 housing units at an average density of 3.4 units per square mile (1.3 units/km^{2}). The racial makeup of the township was 98.29% White, 0.85% from other races, and 0.85% from two or more races. Hispanic or Latino of any race were 0.85% of the population.

There were 50 households, out of which 28.0% had children under the age of 18 living with them, 74.0% were married couples living together, 6.0% had a female householder with no husband present, and 16.0% were non-families. 16.0% of all households were made up of individuals, and none had someone living alone who was 65 years of age or older. The average household size was 2.34 and the average family size was 2.57.

In the township the population was spread out, with 19.7% under the age of 18, 3.4% from 18 to 24, 32.5% from 25 to 44, 32.5% from 45 to 64, and 12.0% who were 65 years of age or older. The median age was 40 years. For every 100 females there were 101.7 males. For every 100 females age 18 and over, there were 108.9 males.

The median income for a household in the township was $46,875, and the median income for a family was $48,750. Males had a median income of $35,833 versus $28,750 for females. The per capita income for the township was $23,309. None of the population and none of the families were below the poverty line.

== History ==
Jay Cooke was among the investors who in 1864 purchased the South Mountain Iron Company at Pine Grove Furnace, a charcoal-fired iron operation dating to 1764. The specific reason that Cooke Township was created in 1872 out of previously existing Penn Township (established 1860) is unclear. Jay Cooke lost the company in the Panic of 1873, but bought back a major portion of it four years later with a group of investors as the South Mountain Mining and Iron Company.

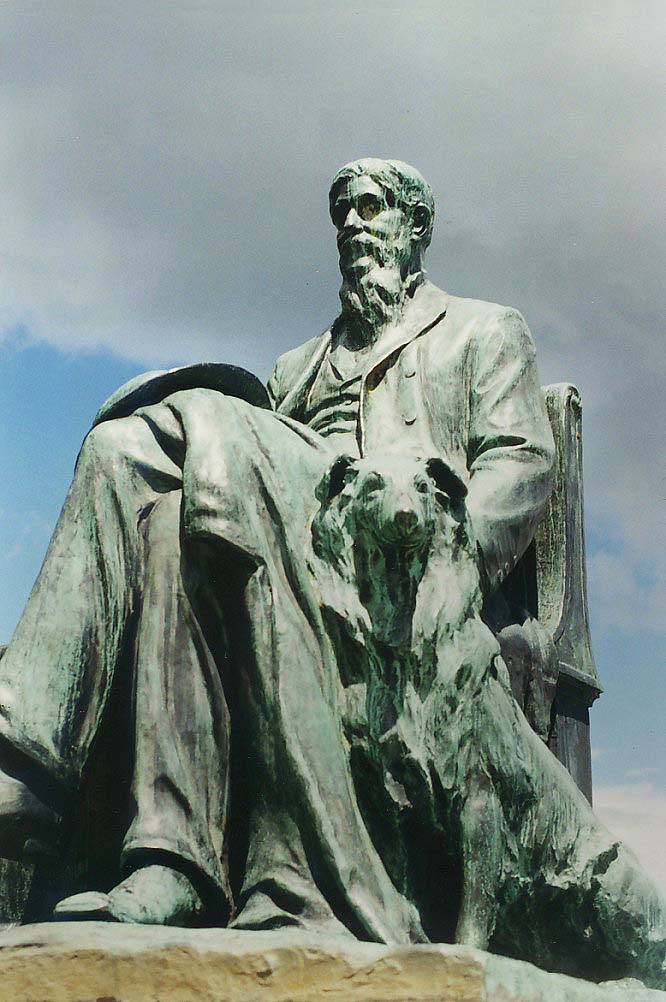
Jay Cooke by Henry Shrady, Duluth, Minnesota

He was still a co-owner at the time of his death. According to the biography by Oberholtzer (who Cooke and his family assisted), Jay Cooke visited Pine Grove Furnace repeatedly. Cooke fished for trout there—he was an avid outdoorsman throughout his life—and he annually brought gifts such as pocket knives and scissors to the small school established there for the workers' children. Cooke Township continues to this day as a very lightly populated but heavily forested area, while the former center of the iron industry within it is now Pine Grove Furnace State Park.

The Pine Grove Furnace was added to the National Register of Historic Places in 1977.
