= Hunters Run, Pennsylvania =

Hunters Run
- Unincorporated community
- Etymology: Hunter's Run (stream)
- Interactive map of Hunters Run
- Coordinates: 40°04′19″N 77°11′43″W
- Country: United States
- State: Pennsylvania
- County: Cumberland
- Time zone: UTC-5 (EST)
  - Summer (DST): UTC-4 (EDT)
- Area code: 717

Hunters Run is a populated place in the South Mountain Range and Cumberland County, Pennsylvania.

It is located where the Gettysburg and Harrisburg Railroad station was established in 1884, at the junction with the 1870 South Mountain Railroad. The junction was later the northeast endpoint of the namesake 1891 Hunter's Run and Slate Belt Railroad.
