= Pine Grove Park =

Former excursion park in Pennsylvania

Pine Grove Park was an excursion park on the South Mountain Railroad line. It was located in Cumberland County, Pennsylvania, "in a grove of magnificent trees". It was established by Colonel Jackson C. Fuller c. 1881. It operated from c. 1881 to c. 1904.

Fuller also owned a farm in the area, and established the railroad's Round Top Park at the Gettysburg Battlefield in 1884.

== History ==
The Fuller Cornet Band often performed at the park. Pine Grove Park hosted the American Institute of Mine Engineers on October 27, 1881, and J.C. Fuller’s Fifth Annual Reunion on September 18, 1883. By July 1884, the park included a green field for baseball and other games, water fountains, lunch tables & seats, a dancing pavilion, a bowling alley, children's swings, a carousel, and a 200 yd (180 m) rifle range.

A Baldwin steam car carried visitors between the park and the nearby iron works. The "first hard day's practice" of the 1903 Dickinson College football team took place at the park. Both Pine Grove Park and Pine Grove Furnace State Park were listed in 1904 as railway stations on the Hunter's Run and Slate Belt Railroad, but the park ceased operations c. 1904, and was "in ruins" when the Reading Company laid new tracks near the former park in 1912.

A January 1913 plan to restore the private park was superseded by the commonwealth's purchase of the surrounding area. The former site of Pine Grove Park is now part of Pine Grove Furnace State Park.

== See also ==
- South Mountain Range (Maryland−Pennsylvania)
- Tourist attractions in Cumberland County, Pennsylvania
