= Gettysburg and Harrisburg Railroad =

Pennsylvania Railroad operating from 1882 through 1891

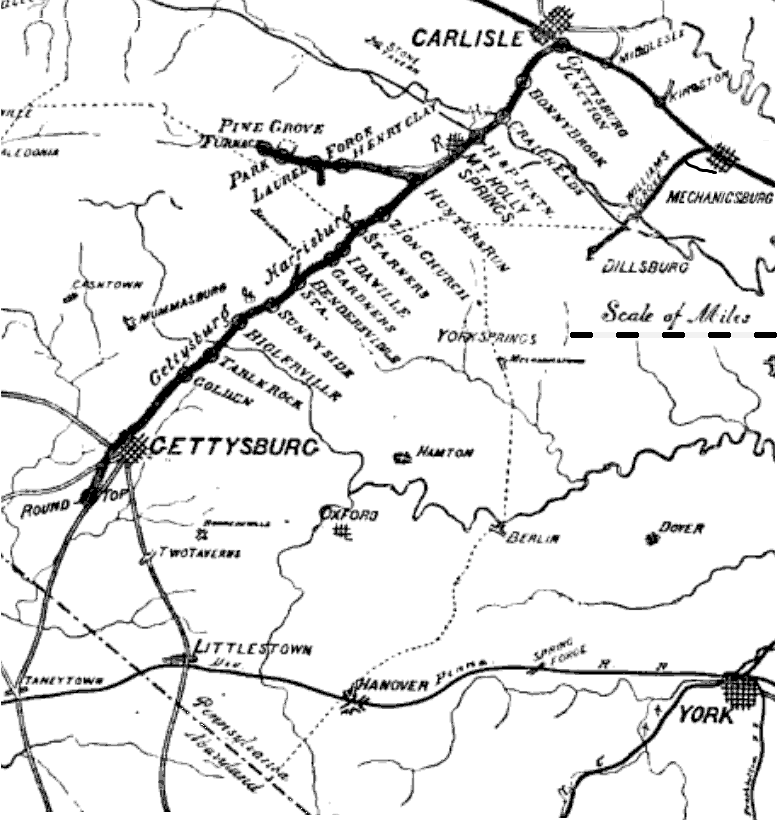
- The G. & H. R. R. was the Gettysburg connection to the Cumberland Valley Railroad at the Hunter's Run junction.

Overview
- Locale: Adams & Cumberland Pennsylvania

History
- Commenced: 1882
- Completed: 1884

Technical
- Line length: 21.5 mi (34.6 km)
- Track gauge: 4 ft 8 1/2 in (1,435 mm)
External images
- 1886 relief map @ Gettysburg
- station with engine on south spur

The Gettysburg and Harrisburg Railroad (G. & H. R. R.) was a railway line of Pennsylvania from Hunter's Run southward to Gettysburg in the 19th century. The north junction was with the South Mountain RR, and a crossing with the Hanover Junction, Hanover and Gettysburg Railroad's westward extension was at Gettysburg. The crossing also served as a junction for westbound trains to transfer southward across the Gettysburg Battlefield via the G. & H. R. R.'s Round Top Branch to the company's Little Round Top Park.

== History ==
The company charter was granted on October 6, 1882, to "J. C. Fuller, Jay Cooke, John M. Butler, Jay Cooke, jr., [sic] R. J. Woodward, Spencer Ervin, Charles D. Barney, Wm. H. Woodward, and Daniel King." The 22 mi (35 km) initial route by Professor Ambrose E. Lehman had been surveyed into Gettysburg along Rock Creek on January 12, 1882, but the mainline was instead completed into the west side of the borough along Oak Ridge. The passenger schedules expanded from three to seven stations between Hunter's Run and Gettysburg from April 21 to July 3, 1884; with the former identifying the Pine Grove station off the mainline and the latter similarly adding "Laurel" ("Table Rock" was added by May 25, 1885).

Groundbreaking was on April 18, 1883, and grading had been started by June 20 and completed in October, except for December grading of the Gettysburg roundhouse lot on the north side of the "Tapeworm" right-of-way. Tracklaying had begun on August 20, 1883; the 1st train arrived February 26, 1884 (two "golden" spikes driven); the station was completed by Joseph J Smith on March 4 ("cellar and foundations" by George W. Lady); and scheduled passenger service began April 21, 1884. Conewago Creek (west) flood damage on June 24 was repaired, and the first fatality was on July 22, 1884, when the "Jay Cooke" locomotive decapitated a man who stopped his wagon on the tracks (additional locomotives included Engine No. 7, the "J. C. Fuller".) On May 12, 1884, the company laid east-west Gettysburg tracks along Railroad St across Washington St, and the competing east–west railroad to Gettysburg added track on Carlisle St the next morning to prevent the Gettysburg and Harrisburg from continuing eastward. (By 1904, the east–west railroad had allowed the G. & H. R. R. to connect for a southern junction near the lane now named Gilliland Alley.)

The first Gettysburg excursion train to Pine Grove Park was on May 28, 1884. Two additional G. & H. R. R. stations were south of Gettysburg for excursions on the Round Top Branch; which had been surveyed by July 14, 1882; had begun construction by May 1884; and had started operations in June 1884. Beginning with the 1884 Camp Gettysburg, the Round Top Branch supported various Gettysburg Battlefield camps after the American Civil War such as the 1918 Camp Colt.

In October 1884, Chief Engineer Lehman commenced an Idaville-to-York Springs survey for an eastward branch. A new Baldwin locomotive had been purchased by April 10, 1889, when Lehman began the survey for the southward extension from Round Top to the Washington, DC, Pennsylvania Railroad terminal at the National Mall via Westminster, Maryland and that was never built (Lehman & Col Fuller had visited Littlestown, Pennsylvania, in 1884 regarding the Westminster route.) In February 1899, an engine derailed while a hostler moved it from the Gettysburg roundhouse.

The "Reading Railroad" took control of the Gettysburg and Harrisburg Railroad on May 22, 1891, and retained the G & H's superintendent (W. H. Woodward) as the head of their Gettysburg and Harrisburg Railway.
