= Gettysburg and Harrisburg Railway =

Railway line in Pennsylvania

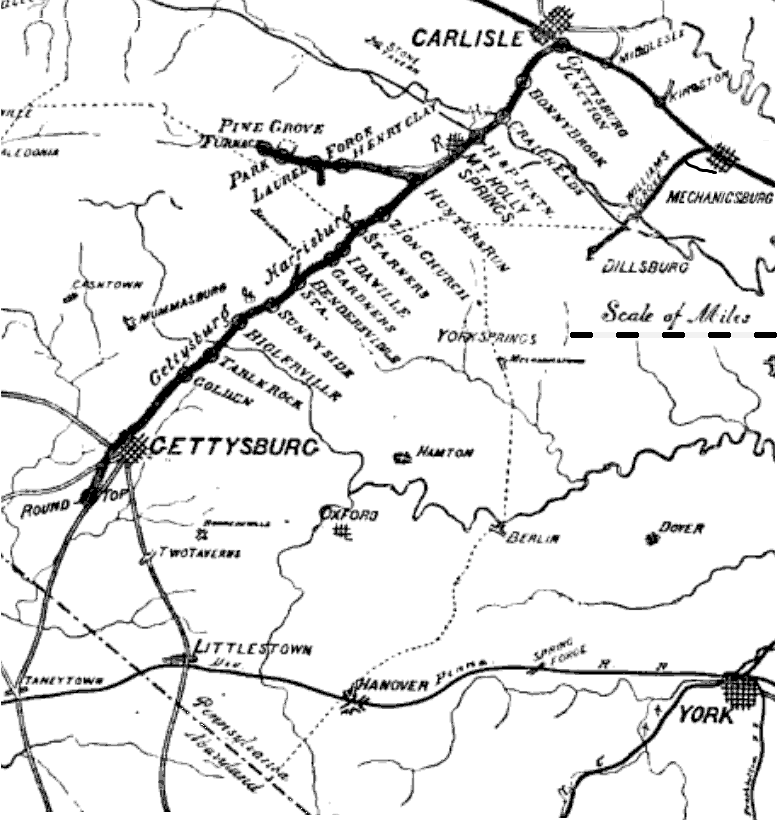
- 1885 map of railroad tracks that in 1891 would become the Gettysburg and Harrisburg Railway and, to the Pine Grove Iron Works, the Hunter's Run and Slate Belt Railroad.

Overview
- Locale: Pennsylvania, United States

History
- Opened: 1891

Technical
- Track gauge: 4 ft 8 1/2 in (1,435 mm)

The Gettysburg and Harrisburg Railway was a Pennsylvania line from near Carlisle southward to Gettysburg operated by a subsidiary of the Reading Company. The line also included the Round Top Branch over the Gettysburg Battlefield to Round Top, Pennsylvania until c. 1942.

Station names at Gettysburg

1893: "Philadelphia and Reading station"
1909: "Philadelphia Railroad Station”
1914: “Reading railroad station”
1919: “Philadelphia and Reading railroad station”
1935: "Reading station"

== History ==
The Gettysburg and Harrisburg Railway was formed when the "Philadelphia and Reading Railway" took control of the South Mountain Railroad and on May 22, 1891, the Gettysburg and Harrisburg Railroad (the G & H RR superintendent, W. H. Woodward, was retained). On May 18, 1897, on the north side of the railroad's station at Gettysburg, the "Philadelphia and Reading Railway " had finished another siding across Washington St. By 1904, the Gettysburg yards had 5 sidings, including 3 over Washington St and 1 toward Pennsylvania College's Glatfelter Hall. Attached to the Washington St siding south of the station was the sole westward siding to the turntable and the roundhouse, which was on the northeast corner of the crossing. The crossing was the site of a 1909 Philadelphia and Reading Railway and Western Maryland collision of freight trains.

Just prior to the 1913 Gettysburg reunion, additional passing sidings on the "Gettysburg & Harrisburg branch of the Philadelphia and Reading Railway" were constructed between Goodyear and Gettysburg, and a switch from Round Top Branch connected westbound onto the Western Maryland. The state health department operated reunion comfort stations at both Gettysburg depots (cf. Gettysburg Railroad Station), and President Woodrow Wilson used the Round Top Branch to depart the Great Camp on his special train. Similarly, President Franklin D. Roosevelt's southbound train passed the Eternal Light Peace Memorial and stopped at a special station from where he motored to Oak Hill to dedicate the memorial during the 1938 Gettysburg reunion. In 1924, the land for the Idaville station was sold.

One of the railroad's last excursion trains was a May 7, 1939, Reading Co. train with 400 from Philadelphia over the Round Top Branch. Except for special occasions, e.g., Bethlehem students in 1958, Reading Co. passenger service to Gettysburg ceased in 1941; and a 1942 application was made to abandon nearly the entire Round Top Branch. The station was repainted in 1946, and the turntable and 3-engine roundhouse had been removed before 1970. The Gettysburg spur south of the east-west Western Maryland RR crossing and that had been part of the Round Top Branch remained until at least 1962.

=== Subsequent companies ===
External images
- 1913 reunion crowd at P & R station
- 2009 “Pioneer Lines” station

The Reading Company filed for bankruptcy in 1971 and the railway line was owned by Conrail in 1976 from April 1-October. The line was purchased by the Blairsville & Indiana Railroad which changed its name to Gettysburg Railroad (1976–1996) and used the line for freight and, under its Gettysburg Passenger Services subsidiary, tourist excursions. (In the mid-1990s the line's junction at Gettysburg was moved west to Seminary Ridge.) In 1996 the line was purchased by the RailAmerica subsidiary, Delaware Valley Railroad Company, which created a new operating company, Gettysburg Railway, that included Gettysburg Scenic Rail Tours. The line was sold October 1997 to John H. Marino, who operated the line until 2001. The station was purchased by Gettysburg College (which requested restoration funds in 1999) and was used by the Pioneer Lines Scenic Railway for diesel excursions on the line by 2007.

The remaining G. & H. tracks are part of the 25 mi (40 km) Gettysburg & Northern Railroad which transports ”canned goods, pulpboard, soda ash, grain, and scrap paper” and connects via 6 stations to the Norfolk Southern Railway at Mount Holly Springs and CSX Transportation at Gettysburg.
