= Gettysburg Railway =

Overview
- Headquarters: Gettysburg, Pennsylvania
- Reporting mark: GBRY
- Locale: Gettysburg, Pennsylvania, U.S.
- Dates of operation: 1996–2001
- Predecessor: Gettysburg Railroad
- Successor: Gettysburg and Northern Railroad

Technical
- Track gauge: 4 ft 8 1/2 in (1,435 mm) standard gauge
- Length: 23.4 mi (37.7 km)

The Gettysburg Railway (reporting mark GBRY) was a Pennsylvania short-line railroad of RailAmerica that operated on 23.4 mi (37.7 km) between Gettysburg and Mount Holly Springs. The line shipped freight for local companies, interchanged with Conrail at Carlisle Junction in Mount Holly Springs, and operated a tourist railroad under a subsidiary, Gettysburg Scenic Rail Tours. In November 1996, the Gettysburg Railway company was created to operate the Gettysburg Railroad, which had been purchased by RailAmerica's Delaware Valley Railroad Company for $1,075,000. The GBRY operated their own freight and tourist trains using their own equipment, including two Ex-Milwaukee Road F7’s from Dakota Rail. The right-of-way was later sold again to Pioneer RailCorp in 2001, who created the Gettysburg and Northern Railroad.

== See also ==
- List of defunct Pennsylvania railroads
