= Gettysburg Railroad (1976–1996) =

Defunct tourist railroad formerly in Gettysburg, Pennsylvania

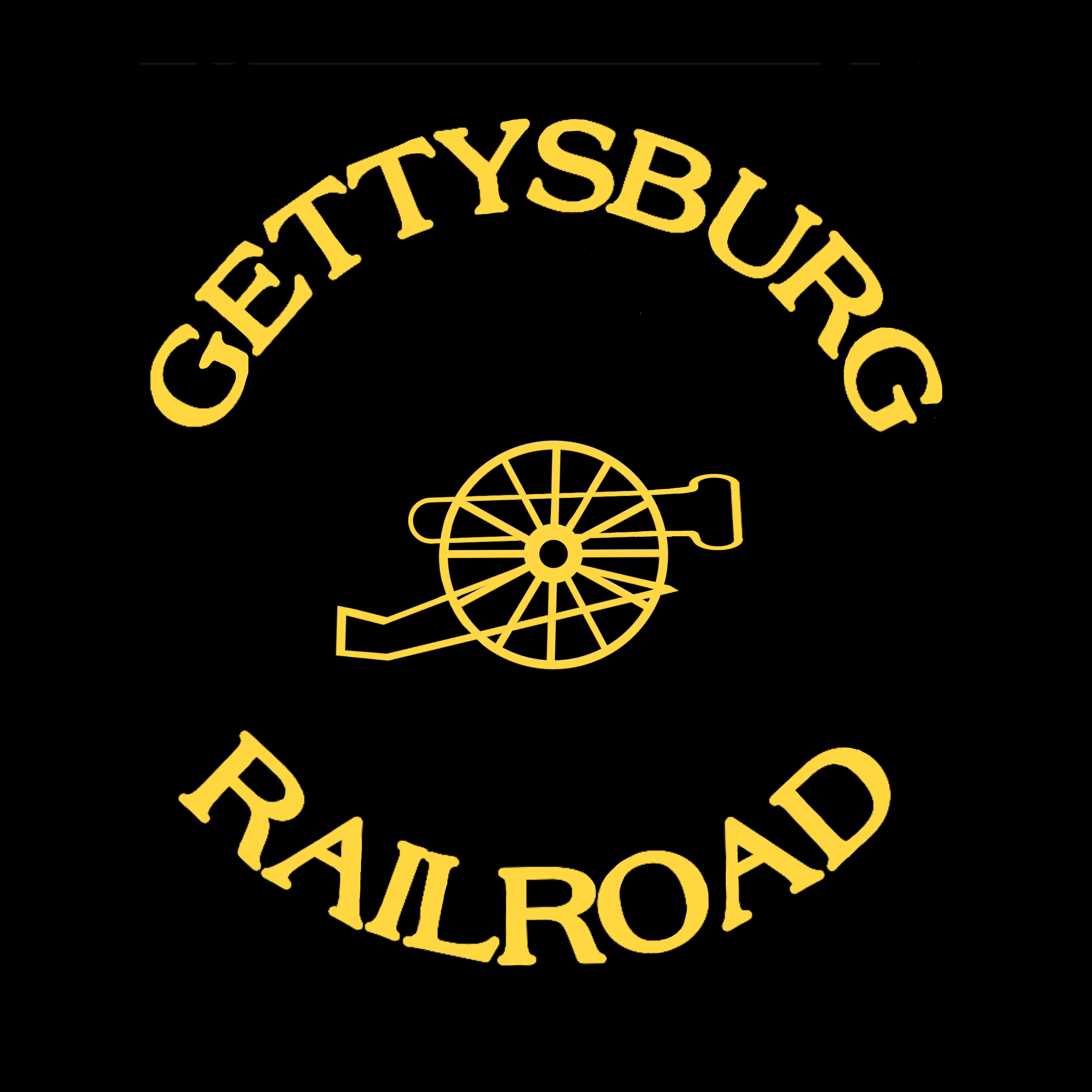
- GE U30B No. 28 leading a tourist train at the Gettysburg Railroad, September 20, 1985

Overview
- Headquarters: Gettysburg, Pennsylvania
- Reporting mark: GETY/GPSX
- Locale: Gettysburg, Pennsylvania, U.S.
- Dates of operation: 1976–1996
- Predecessor: Reading Railroad
- Successor: Gettysburg Railway

Technical
- Track gauge: 4 ft 8 1/2 in (1,435 mm) standard gauge
- Length: 23.4 mi (37.7 km)

The Gettysburg Railroad (reporting mark GETY) was a short-line heritage railroad that operated in Pennsylvania from 1976 to 1996. The 23.4 mi (37.7 km) line ran from Gettysburg to Mount Holly Springs.

The railroad shipped freight for local companies and interchanged with CSX Transportation in Gettysburg and Conrail at Carlisle Junction in Mount Holly Springs. It also operated a tourist railroad under a subsidiary, Gettysburg Passenger Services.

== History ==
The railroad was built in the late 19th century and opened in 1891 as the Gettysburg and Harrisburg Railway. The line was later leased to the Reading Railroad and operated as the "Gettysburg Branch." Following the Reading's bankruptcy in 1971, it sold portions of its assets to the new-formed Conrail in 1976, however the Gettysburg branch was not included in the transfer. The branch was acquired by the Pennsylvania Department of Transportation, which then sold the line to a new company, the Blairsville & Indiana Railroad, in 1976. The latter company subsequently changed its name to Gettysburg Railroad. The Gettysburg Railroad was sold to Delaware Valley Railroad Company, a subsidiary of RailAmerica, in November 1996. Delaware Valley created a new operating company, the Gettysburg Railway.

== Locomotives ==
The Gettysburg Railroad went through a total of four steam locomotives in use, and they only had two by 1988. Between January and June 1995, both locomotives were inspected by the Federal Railroad Administration (FRA) and deemed to be in good enough working order to remain in service.

Number	Builder	Railroad	Type	Built	At Gettysburg
3254	Canadian Locomotive Company	Canadian National Railway	Steam	1917	1982–1987
1278	Canadian Locomotive Company	Canadian Pacific Railway	Steam	1948	1987–1996
76	Baldwin Locomotive Works	Mississippian Railway	Steam	1920	1976–1996
38	Baldwin Locomotive Works	Huntingdon and Broad Top Mountain Railroad and Coal Company	Steam	1927	1977–1986
39	General Motors Electro-Motive Division	Western Maryland Railway	Diesel	1957	1989–1996
28	GE Transportation Systems	Penn Central Transportation Company	Diesel	1967	1985–1989
56	American Locomotive Company	Long Island Rail Road	Diesel	1955	1978–1988
70	American Locomotive Company	Norfolk and Western Railway	Diesel	1962	1985–1996
407	Baldwin Locomotive Works	Norfolk and Western Railway	Diesel	1953	1976–1985

== Incident ==
On June 16, 1995, locomotive No. 1278 suffered a boiler backdraft explosion while hauling an excursion train, severely injuring the engineer and both firemen. None of the passengers were injured. The excursion train was delayed 45 minutes until a diesel locomotive could be connected to complete the rest of the trip. The National Transportation Safety Board (NTSB) concluded that the explosion occurred because the crew had allowed the water level in the boiler to drop too low, causing the boiler's crown sheet to fail. The NTSB also determined that poor maintenance of the locomotive, as well as inadequate training, were contributing factors to the accident.

After the incident, the Gettysburg Railroad stopped using steam locomotives for their excursions and only used diesel locomotives. The railroad itself was sold off the following year.
