= South Mountain Railroad (Cumberland) =

Overview
- Locale: Cumberland County, Pennsylvania

History
- Commenced: 1869
- Completed: 1870
- Chartered: 1865 (SM Iron Co)
- Acquired: 1877 (SM Railway & Mining Co.)
- Merged: 1891 (Gett. & Harr. Railway)

Technical
- Line length: 17.78 mi (28.61 km)

The South Mountain Railroad was a southcentral Pennsylvania railway line for "connecting the Pine Grove works to the Cumberland Valley R. R." and which provided mining and passenger services via a southwest section from Hunter's Run, Pennsylvania, and a northern section from Hunter's Run to the CVRR junction northeast of Carlisle. The northern section merged with the Gettysburg & Harrisburg Railroad line south from Hunter's Run to the Gettysburg Battlefield in 1891 to create the Gettysburg & Harrisburg Railway line, while the branch southwest from Hunter's Run became the Hunter's Run and Slate Belt Railroad line.

Modernized sections of the South Mountain Railroad remain north of Hunter's Run; while parts of the railbed are available for hiking and biking such as near Carlisle (Letort Spring Run Nature Trail) and the Pine Grove Furnace State Park (Cumberland County Biker/Hiker Trail with section of the Appalachian Trail.)

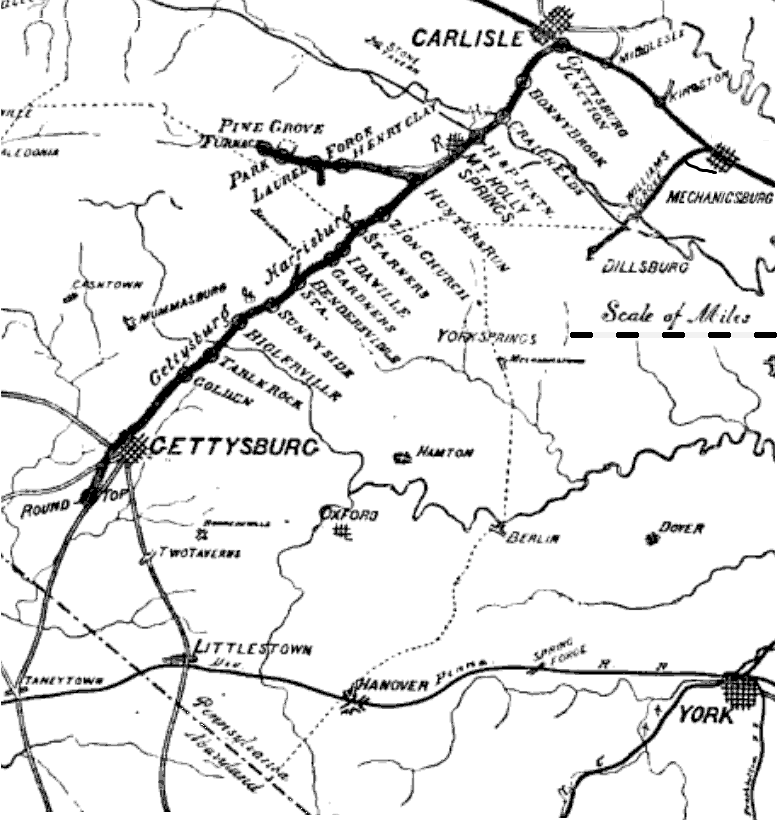
1885 map with SMRR (top) depicts the Hunter's Run junction with the Gettysburg and Harrisburg Railroad, the Gettysburg Junction with the Cumberland Valley Railroad, and the "H. & P. Juntn." with the Harrisburg and Philadelphia Railroad. Not shown: east-west Hanover Junction, Hanover and Gettysburg Railroad through Gettysburg

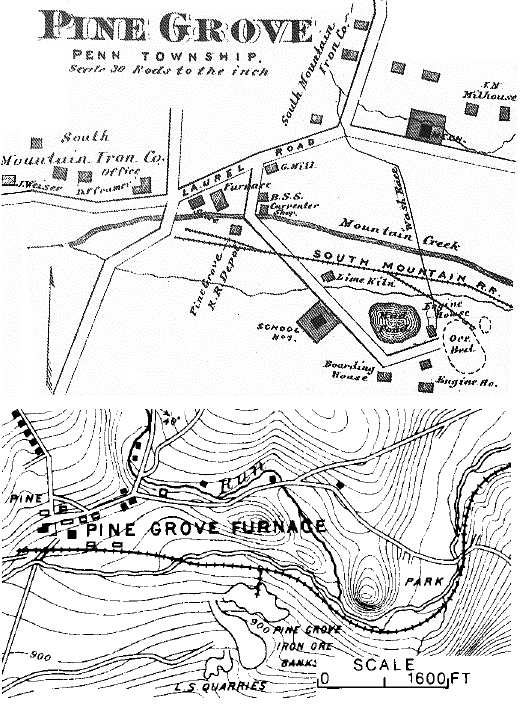
1872 (top) & 1889 maps of the terminus at the Pine Grove Iron Works.

== History ==
The South Mountain Railroad was authorized by the South Mountain Iron Company legislation in 1864/1865, and company bonds were issued in 1869. The junction with the Cumberland Valley Railroad was laid east of Carlisle near Ashland Cemetery, Carlisle Barracks, and the Carlisle Indian Industrial School. By June 2, 1874, the railroad had 8 scheduled stops between the terminus and South Mountain Junction; and in December 1875, the railway had sidings of 2.26 mi (3.64 km); 9 passenger, 6 freight, & 3 wood/water stations; and 2 engine houses.

The South Mountain Railway and Mining Company acquired the line in 1877, considered extending the railway line west of Pine Grove in 1880, and "commenced a preliminary survey" in 1881 for a branch southward to Gettysburg. Instead on August 20, 1883; the Gettysburg and Harrisburg Railroad (with the same president, Colonel Jackson C. Fuller) commenced a junction at Hunter's Run for a line to the battlefield. As a result, the South Mountain Railroad's connection near Carlisle at the CVRR's "South Mountain Junction" (named "Carlisle Junction" in the South Mountain RR schedule) was subsequently renamed "Gettysburg Junction". The tracks to Pine Grove Park were used by the first G&H excursion train from Gettysburg on May 28, 1884; and the stop at Laurel Forge was added to the G & H's July 3, 1884, schedule.

By May 1891, the competing Philadelphia, Harrisburg and Pittsburg Railroad extended to Harrisburg from the crossing with the South Mountain RR "about six miles south of Carlisle" north of Mount Holly Springs (named "Carlisle Junction" on both lines' 1904 schedules). The South Mountain Railway and Mining Company's northern section and the Gettysburg and Harrisburg Railroad southward line merged on July 20, 1891, to become the railway line of the Gettysburg and Harrisburg Railway, and the southwest South Mountain RR section from Hunter's Run was leased by the Hunter's Run and Slate Belt Railroad. The lease was terminated on November 11, 1910 and the Reading Company took up operation of the line from Hunters Run to Pine Grove Furnace.

The tracks between Mount Holly Springs toward Carlisle were removed c. 1955, and the tracks near Carlisle branching southward from Gettysburg Junction were abandoned c. 1972. The line's depot and freight station at Gettysburg Junction were subsequently used by the Estep Electric Services Co. The remaining tracks from Hunter's Run to the Mount Holly Springs area are part of the Gettysburg & Northern Railroad.

External images
- 1968 map depicting 1870 "SO MTN" RR
- 1872 Carlisle-Bonny Brook map (4 spurs, 1 siding)
- 1907 Henry Clay Station map (p. 26)
- 1872 Laurel Forge map (depot & 2 spurs)
