= Pine Grove Furnace State Park =

State park in Cumberland County, Pennsylvania, US

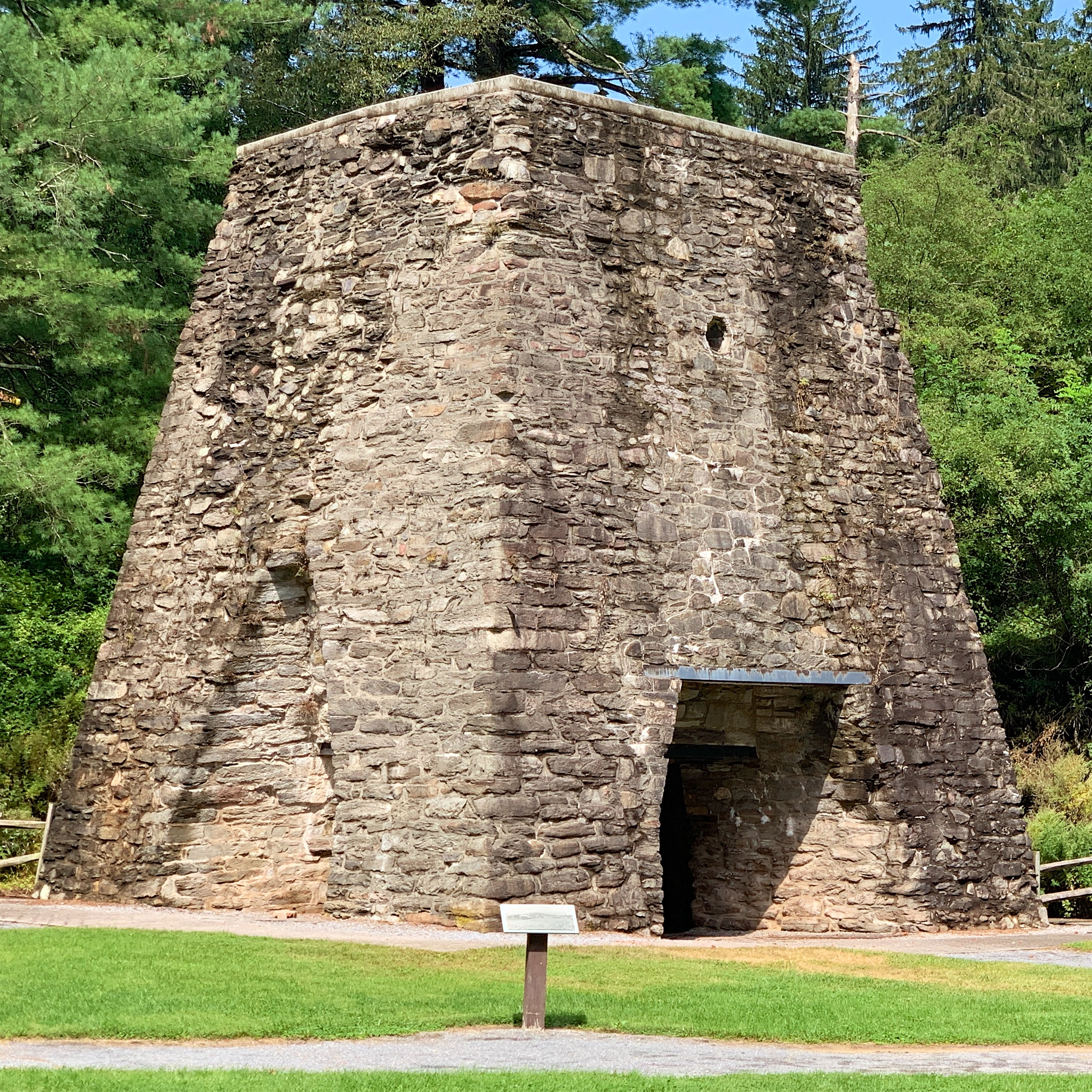
- Pine Grove Furnace Stack

- Location within Pennsylvania Location within the United States
- Interactive map of Pine Grove Furnace State Park
- Location: Mountain Creek valley South Mountain, Cumberland County, Pennsylvania, United States
- Coordinates: 40°01′59″N 77°18′17″W
- Area: 696 acres (282 ha)
- Elevation: 1,631 feet (497 m)
- Established: 1913
- Administrator: Pennsylvania Department of Conservation and Natural Resources
- Website: Official website
- Pennsylvania State Parks

Pine Grove Furnace State Park is a protected Pennsylvania area that includes Laurel and Fuller Lakes in Cooke Township of Cumberland County. The Park accommodates various outdoor recreation activities, protects the remains of the Pine Grove Iron Works (1764), and was the site of Laurel Forge (1830), Pine Grove Park (1880s), and a brick plant (1892). The Park is 8 miles (13 km) from exit 37 of Interstate 81 on Pennsylvania Route 233.

Pine Grove Furnace State Park is home to the Appalachian Trail Museum. It was chosen by the Pennsylvania Department of Conservation and Natural Resources (DCNR) and its Bureau of State Parks as one of "25 Must-See Pennsylvania State Parks".

== History ==
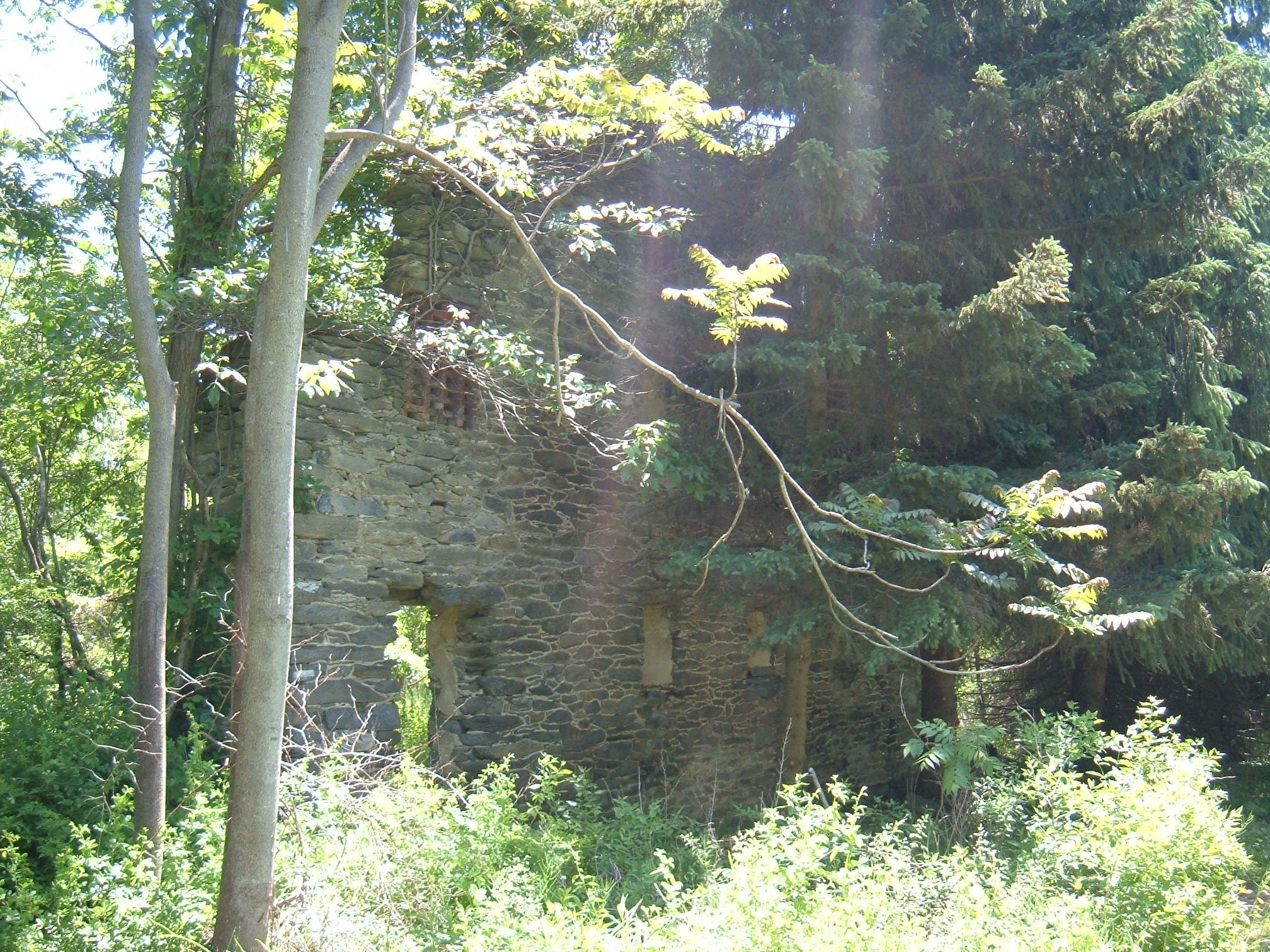
Stone barn ruins

The state park's historic place on the national register is the Pine Grove Iron Works of about 176 acres (0.71 km^{2}) with structures associated with the 1764 Pine Grove Furnace, which ended production in 1895. The 1870 South Mountain RR and the subsequent 1891 Hunter's Run and Slate Belt Railroad provided the railway lines to the industrial areas of the state park.

=== Laurel Forge ===
Laurel Forge manufactured wrought iron from Pine Grove Furnace pig iron and was built by Peter Ege in 1830. The Laurel Forge Pond (now Laurel Lake) was created by a dam below the Sage Run confluence at Mountain Creek to provide waterwheel power via the forge's water race. By 1873 the forge area included a boarding house, coal house, several dwellings, 2 railroad spurs, and a train depot; and in 1884 "Laurel Station" was added as a stop for excursions of the Gettysburg and Harrisburg Railroad. Laurel Dam was breached by flooding in 1889 and 1919 (downwash from both breached the Mount Holly Springs dam downstream), and the lake is 25 acres (0.10 km^{2}) of the state park.

=== Fuller Brick and Slate Company ===
The Fuller Brick and Slate Company's operations that began in 1892 were developed by J. W. Ivery at the "Pine Grove works" using clay exposed in the region's quarries. Slate was quarried 3 mi (4.8 km) southwest of the works, the soapstone was "hauled by wagon from the quarry a quarter of a mile from the works, and the clay [was] brought by rail from Laurel Station, three miles away" (the Pine Grove kiln held 12,000 bricks). The soapstone was used for washing the clay (Ivery patent in 1901) and the clay was formed, dried, and kilned south of the iron works at the brick plant in front of cemetery hill until c. 1913.

=== State forest and park ===
The Pine Grove Division of the state's South Mountain Forest began with the South Mountain Mining & Iron Company's sale of 6,993 acres (28.30 km^{2}) acres to the Pennsylvania Bureau of Forestry in 1912. On September 12, 1913, three additional tracts totaling 9,873 acres (39.95 km^{2}) were sold in the areas of land surrounding Pine Grove and Laurel Forge—including 1,817 acres (7.35 km^{2}) in Adams County. By 1921, "Pine Grove" was one of Pennsylvania's 7 "forest parks", within which the smaller Pine Grove Furnace State Park was established by 1931 under the 1929 Pennsylvania Bureau of State Parks (the remaining state forest was named the Michaux State Forest.)

Many of the facilities at the park were built during the Great Depression by the Civilian Conservation Corps. The young men of the CCC Camp S-51-PA constructed roads throughout the state forests, constructed bridges on the state roads, planted trees for reforestation, and cleaned streams. The 1912 Reading railroad tracks have been removed, and from mid-September 2006 through July 2007, Laurel Lake and its dam were reconditioned. Park lifeguards were eliminated for the 2008 season but were restored to Fuller Lake in 2009 after a July 2008 Fuller Lake drowning, the 1st at a state park beach since 1999.

Appalachian Trail @ Pine Grove Furnace SP (west-to-east)
Intersection	Coordinates
W park border (pt on PA 233)	40.0312°N 77.3119°W
& former "Laurel Road"	40.0319°N 77.3101°W
T339 & Biker/Hiker Trail	40.0314°N 77.3053°W
Mountain Cr bridge @ Fuller Lake	40.0308°N 77.2978°W
E park border (Old RR Bed Rd)	40.0317°N 77.2903°W

== Recreation ==
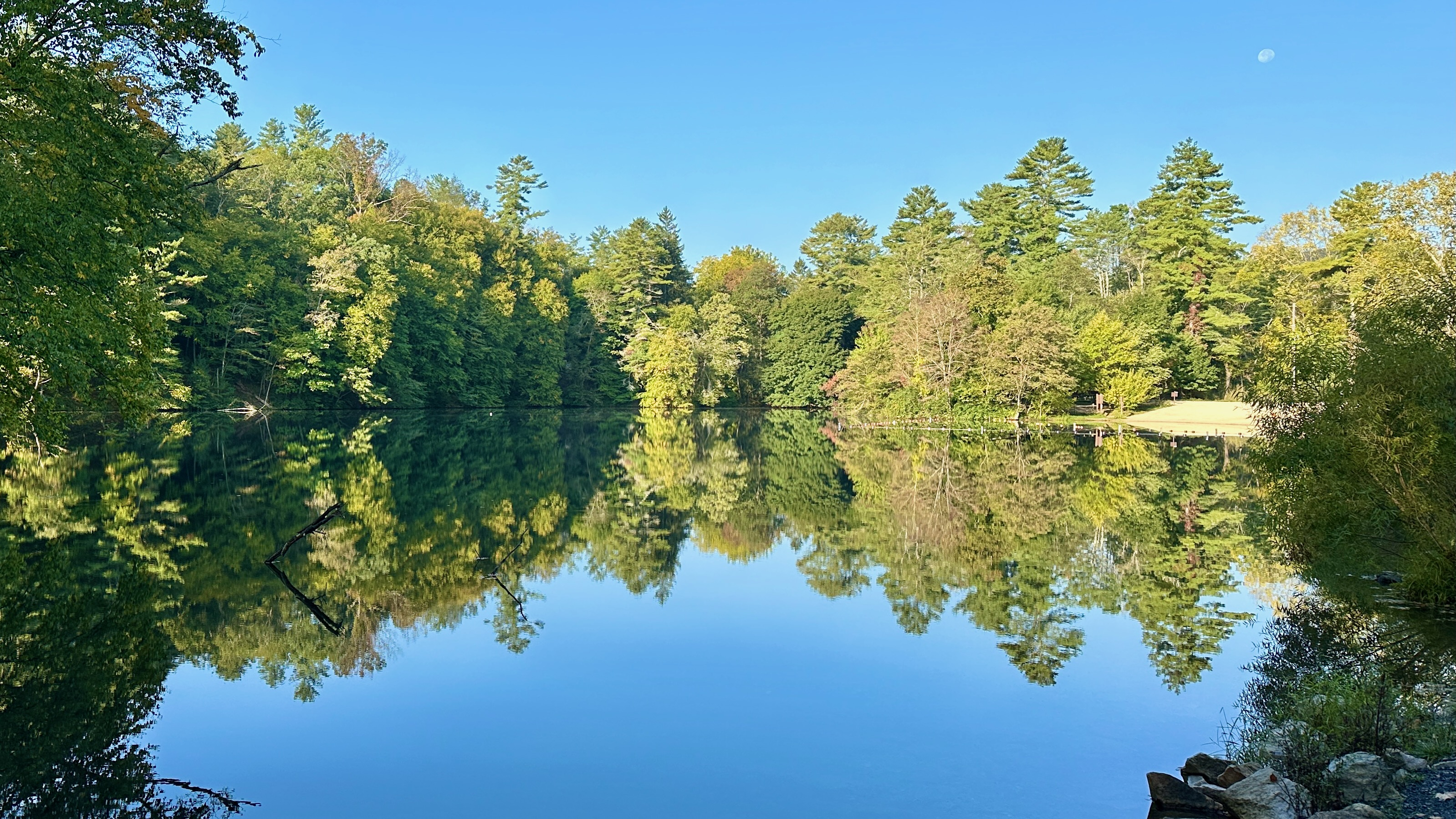
Fuller Lake, abandoned iron ore quarry

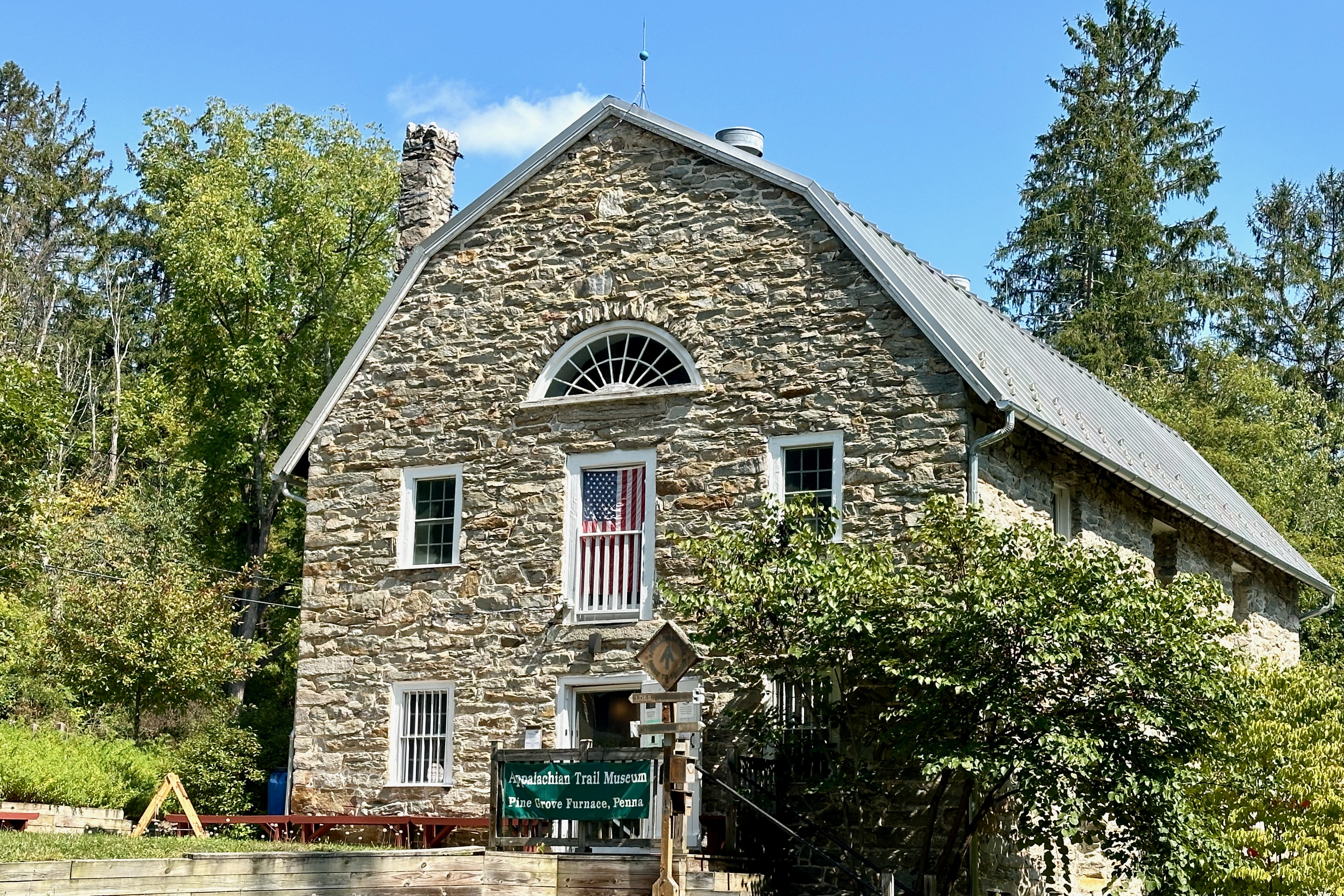
Former grist mill, now used as the Appalachian Trail Museum

Fuller Lake is 1.7 acres (0.69 ha) in the area and is filled, abandoned quarry of the Pine Grove Iron Works. Boating is not permitted. Laurel Lake is a 25 acres (10 ha) body of water that was created to supply water power for Laurel Forge. Boaters are limited to using electric-powered and non-powered watercraft, gas-powered boats are not permitted. All electric-powered boats must have valid registration from any state, unpowered boats must have a launch permit from PA DCNR or PA Fish and Boat Commission.

In-season archery hunting is permitted in most of the state park, while small areas for seasonal firearms hunting are on the west and south (groundhog hunting is prohibited). The beaches and swimming at Fuller and Laurel Lakes are open Memorial Day weekend through Labor Day weekend.

A former grist mill is now used as the Appalachian Trail Museum and a former inn is now the park office.

There are many picnic tables throughout the Park and two pavilions are available for rent.

=== Hiking ===
The Park has 1.4 miles (2.3 km) of the Appalachian Trail over the Cumberland County Biker/Hiker Trail (rail trail) and, on the west, along 0.4 miles (0.64 km) of roadways. The marker for the Appalachian Trail midpoint is east of the state park (40°1.827′N 77°17.225′W), and thru-hikers completing the store's half-gallon ice cream challenge receive a commemorative wooden spoon. The trails are open to cross-country skiing and some trails and roads are open to snowmobiling during the winter months.

- Creek Trail is a 0.5-mile (0.80 km) trail that begins at the park amphitheater and follows Mountain Creek as it passes vernal pools and a stand of white pine trees.
- Mountain Creek Trail is a 1.4-mile (2.3 km) trail that passes through wetlands and forests as it follows Mountain Creek. Hikers may get the opportunity to see white-tail deer, heron, beavers and waterfowl.
- Koppenhaver Trail is 1.0-mile (1.6 km) in length and passes through a stand of mature hemlock and white pine.
- Swamp Trail is 0.25-mile (0.40 km) in length and, quite naturally, passes through a swamp.

=== Camping and lodging ===
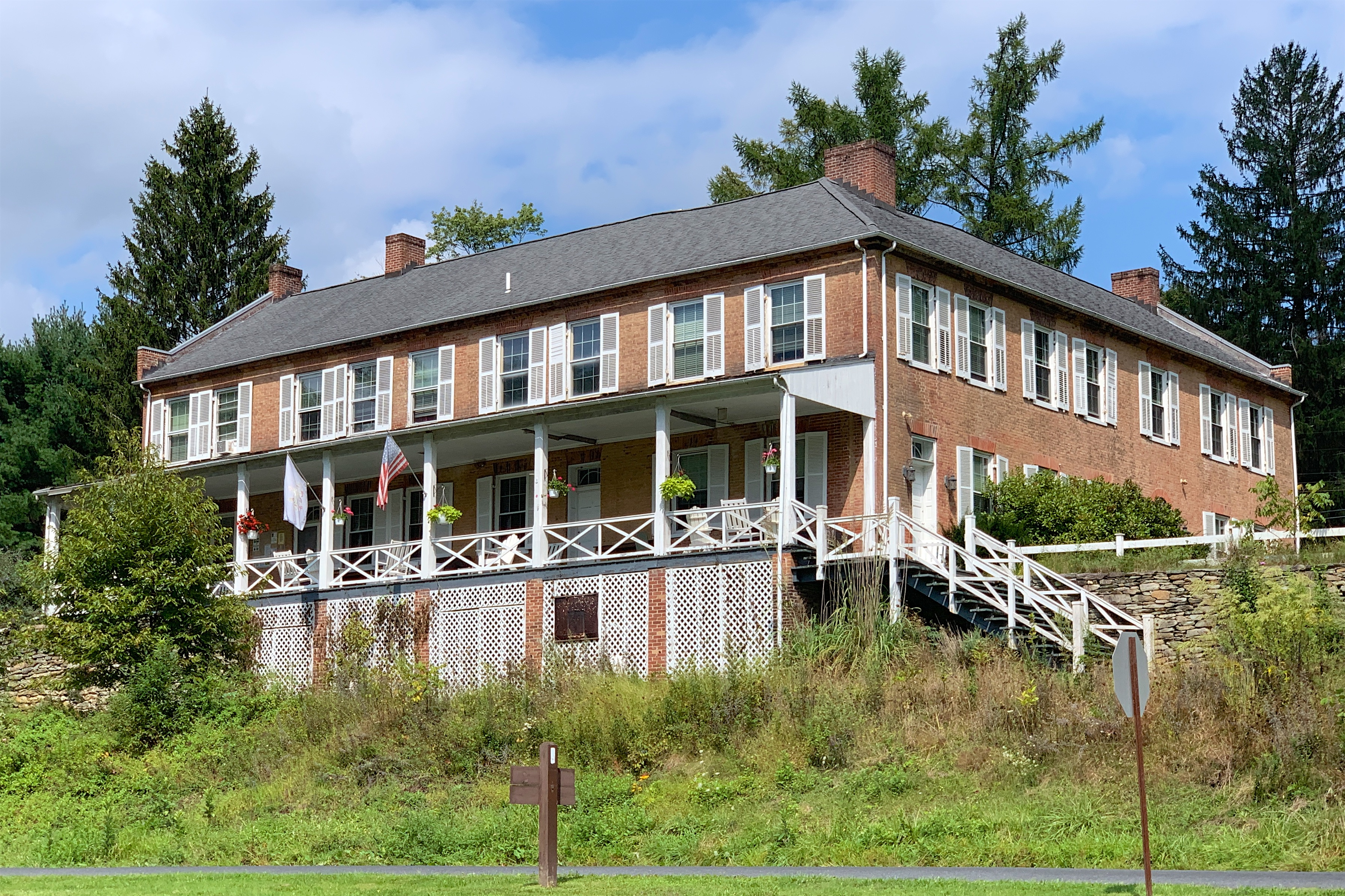
Ironmaster's Mansion

Charcoal Hearth Campground along Bendersville Rd is 0.25 miles (0.40 km) south of the park's store and has 71 sites for travel trailers and tenting, and across the road is a wooded "organized group tenting" area around an open playing field (a YMCA camp is near Laurel Lake). The Paymasters Cabin has central heating and is available for rent. The Ironmaster's Mansion is a youth hostel commonly used by Appalachian Trail thru-hikers.

== Geography and ecology ==
The park's portions of the Mountain Creek valley and the neighboring mountain slopes (Piney Mountain, Pole Steeple, & South Mountain) are part of the Appalachian-Blue Ridge forests ecoregion and are predominately wooded. In addition to the typical mammals, birds, insects, and other fauna of the northeastern US ecoregion, the park's Laurel Lake attracts migratory waterfowl of the Atlantic Flyway (butterflies reach their peak in the summer months.) The lakes have pickerel, trout and perch; while Mountain Creek has brook, brown and rainbow trout.
