= Mountain Creek (Yellow Breeches Creek tributary) =

Stream in Cumberland County, Pennsylvania

Coordinates: 40°08′41″N 77°10′39″W

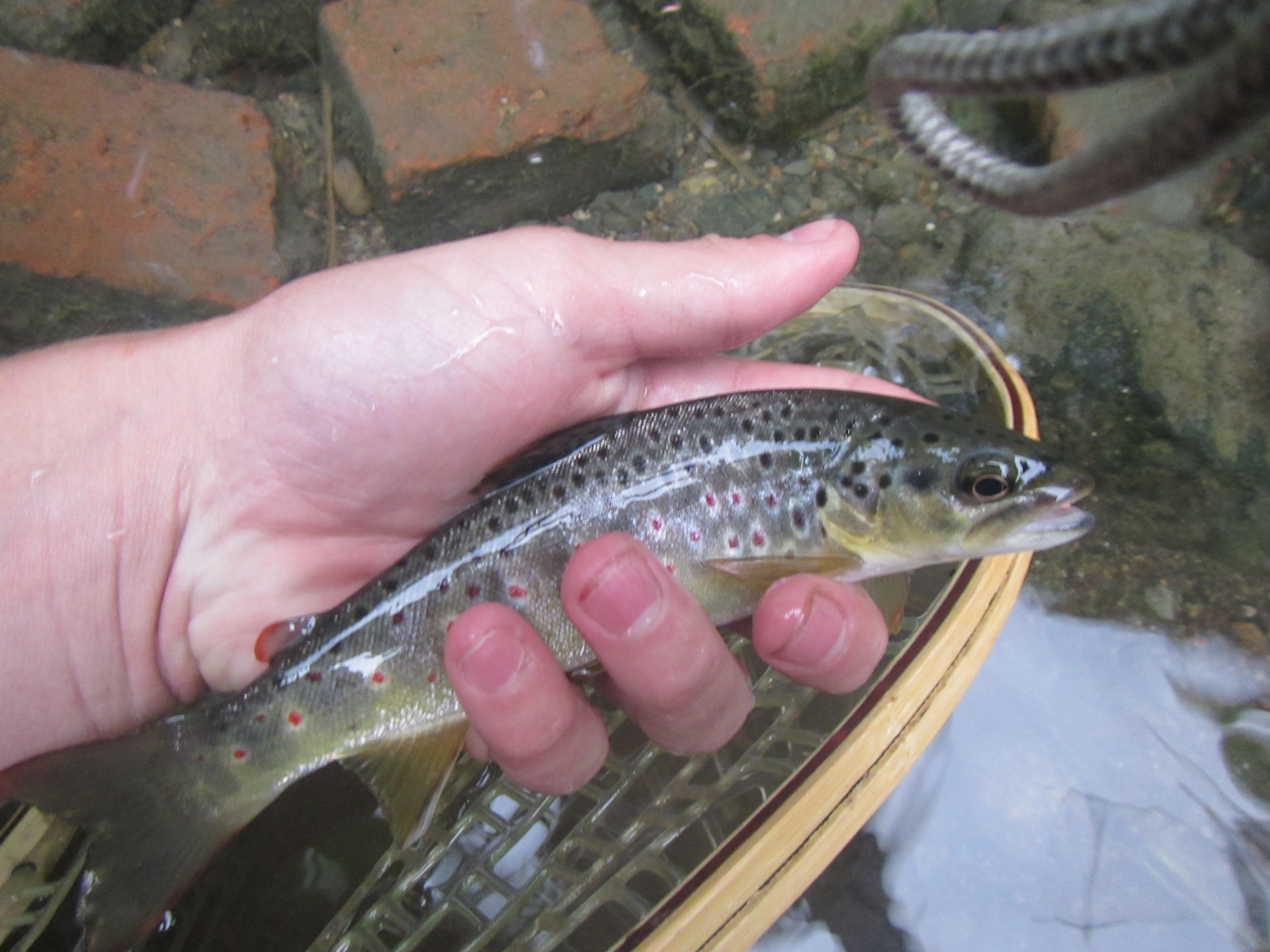
Mountain Creek wild Brown Trout

Mountain Creek is a 20.9-mile-long (33.6 km) tributary of Yellow Breeches Creek in Cumberland County, Pennsylvania.

== Course ==
Mountain Creek starts in the South Mountain Range and Michaux State Forest and flows through them and Pine Grove Furnace State Park. After leaving the state park, the stream runs through Toland and the Holly Gap Marsh Preserve. It flows through the borough of Mount Holly Springs and joins with Yellow Breeches Creek near the borough.

Upper Mountain Creek is impounded by a dam to create a mountain reservoir, Laurel Lake

=== Tributaries ===
- Hunters Run
- Tagg Run
- Sage Run
- Iron Run
- Toms Run

== Recreation ==
Mountain Creek is a popular stocked trout stream, stocked with Brook, Brown, and Rainbow trout. In the headwaters and tributaries, there is a fair population of wild Brook Trout.

== See also ==
- List of rivers of Pennsylvania
- South Mountain Range (Maryland−Pennsylvania)
