= York and Peach Bottom Railway =

Overview
- Headquarters: York, Pennsylvania
- Locale: Southeastern Pennsylvania
- Dates of operation: 1882–1891
- Predecessor: Peach Bottom Railway (Middle Division)
- Successor: Baltimore and Lehigh Railroad

Technical
- Track gauge: 3 ft (914 mm)
- Length: 40 mi (64 km)

The York and Peach Bottom Railway (Y&PB) was a 19th-Century 3 ft (914 mm) narrow gauge railroad in Pennsylvania. It operated freight and passenger trains between York and Delta.

== History ==
The company was formed in 1882 to take over the assets of the bankrupt Middle Division of the Peach Bottom Railway. In 1883 it built an extension from Delta to Peach Bottom (York County), along the western shore of the Susquehanna River. The railroad's owners had hoped to eventually build a bridge across the river to the identically named town of Peach Bottom (Lancaster County) and the Peach Bottom Railroad. However, neither of these two railroads was able to raise sufficient funds to build such a bridge.

In 1889 the Maryland Central Railway, which operated between Delta and Baltimore, acquired control of the Y&PB, and began running through-service trains between York and Baltimore. The Maryland Central owners were interested in expanding further north into Pennsylvania, and they made plans for a merger with the Y&PB. In 1891 the Y&PB and Maryland Central merged to form a new corporation, the Baltimore and Lehigh Railroad.

== See also ==
- List of defunct Pennsylvania railroads
- Maryland and Pennsylvania Railroad (successor to the Baltimore & Lehigh)
