= Peach Bottom Railway =

Former railway line in Pennsylvania, United States

Overview
- Headquarters: Oxford, Pennsylvania
- Locale: Southeastern Pennsylvania
- Dates of operation: 1873–1881
- Successor: Peach Bottom Railroad, York and Peach Bottom Railway

Technical
- Track gauge: 3 ft (914 mm)
- Length: 20 miles (32 km)

The Peach Bottom Railway was a 19th-century 3 ft (914 mm) narrow gauge railroad in Pennsylvania, designed to haul coal from the Broad Top fields in central Pennsylvania to Philadelphia, but succeeded only in establishing two local short lines.

== History ==
=== Charter and plan ===
The railway was chartered on March 24, 1868 and planned in three divisions. The Eastern Division would run from Philadelphia or some point near that city to the Susquehanna River at Peach Bottom. A crossing would need to be effected there to reach the Middle Division, which would run north to the mouth of Muddy Creek and follow that stream to Felton. From Felton, the Middle Division would proceed either to Hanover Junction or York. The Western Division, whose course was never well-defined, would run north of Gettysburg and cross the mountain ridges to the coal fields near Orbisonia.

=== Construction and fundraising ===
The principal promoter was Stephen G. Boyd, a member of the Pennsylvania General Assembly from York County. When the company was organized in 1871, he became President; Samuel R. Dickey, of Oxford, was Vice-President. Local support was drawn principally from York, Lancaster and Chester Counties, representing the Middle and part of the Eastern Divisions. Surveying began on December 1, 1871, and chief engineer John Mifflin Hood recommended adoption of 3 ft (914 mm) narrow gauge, which was very popular at the time as a method of reducing construction costs. Ground was broken on the Eastern Division in August 1872 at Oxford, on the Philadelphia and Baltimore Central Railroad, and construction westward began. Location of the Middle Division, meanwhile, was influenced by the necessity of raising funds for the anticipated crossing of the mountains to the west. The direct route from Felton ran through a sparsely populated area, and a secret attempt to gain financial aid from the Reading by proposing a branch to Wrightsville (across the river from the Reading and Columbia Railroad) was unsuccessful. The company was approached by a group of businessmen from York offering support, and decided to build upon that point. Grading began in York, towards Red Lion and the Muddy Creek watershed.

Funds from the company's stock subscriptions and loans from local banks kept the company afloat during the Panic of 1873. Hood surveyed a route for the Western Division via East Berlin, Biglerville and Arendtsville, following Conewago Creek through the Narrows and the Chambersburg-Gettysburg road through a gap in South Mountain. However, the financial contraction of the Panic made it impossible to raise funds for the line west. Construction continued on the other two divisions, however, with the Eastern Division opening from Oxford to Hopewell on November 10, 1873, and to Goshen on November 25, 1874. On July 4, 1874, the Middle Division was opened from York to Red Lion. The railroad was now pressed for money, and additional fundraising was necessary in 1875. By the end of the year, the Middle Division had reached Bridgeton, and the Eastern Division to Eldora (3 miles (4.8 km) northeast of Peach Bottom). The Middle Division reached Delta and the prospect of abundant slate traffic in 1876, while the Eastern Division pushed on to Dorsey (1 mile (1.6 km) north of Peach Bottom). A contretemps occurred when President Boyd opposed extension of the Middle Division to Peach Bottom, on the grounds that it would generate no local traffic and there was no prospect of bridging the Susquehanna in the near future. In 1877, he was replaced by Charles McConkey, a resident of Peach Bottom, but finances did not allow for construction on the extension to continue, although the Eastern Division finally reached the Susquehanna in 1878.

=== Disposition ===
The two 3 ft (914 mm) narrow gauge lines would never be united. Heavy bonded indebtedness resulted in receivership for both divisions in 1881, and the Eastern Division was reorganized as the Peach Bottom Railroad, while the Middle Division became the York and Peach Bottom Railway. Although the York and Peach Bottom did reach the latter point in 1883, cars were never ferried between the two railroads, and they were never again under the same management.

In 1889 the York and Peach Bottom was purchased by the Maryland Central Railway, and a new consolidated company was formed, the Baltimore and Lehigh Railroad, in 1891. In 1890 the Peach Bottom was sold to a group of Lancaster businessmen and reorganized as the Lancaster, Oxford and Southern Railroad.

== See also ==
- List of defunct Pennsylvania railroads
- Maryland and Pennsylvania Railroad (successor railroad)
- Transportation in Lancaster County, Pennsylvania
