= Scott Creek Bridge-North, Maryland and Pennsylvania Railroad =

- U.S. National Register of Historic Places
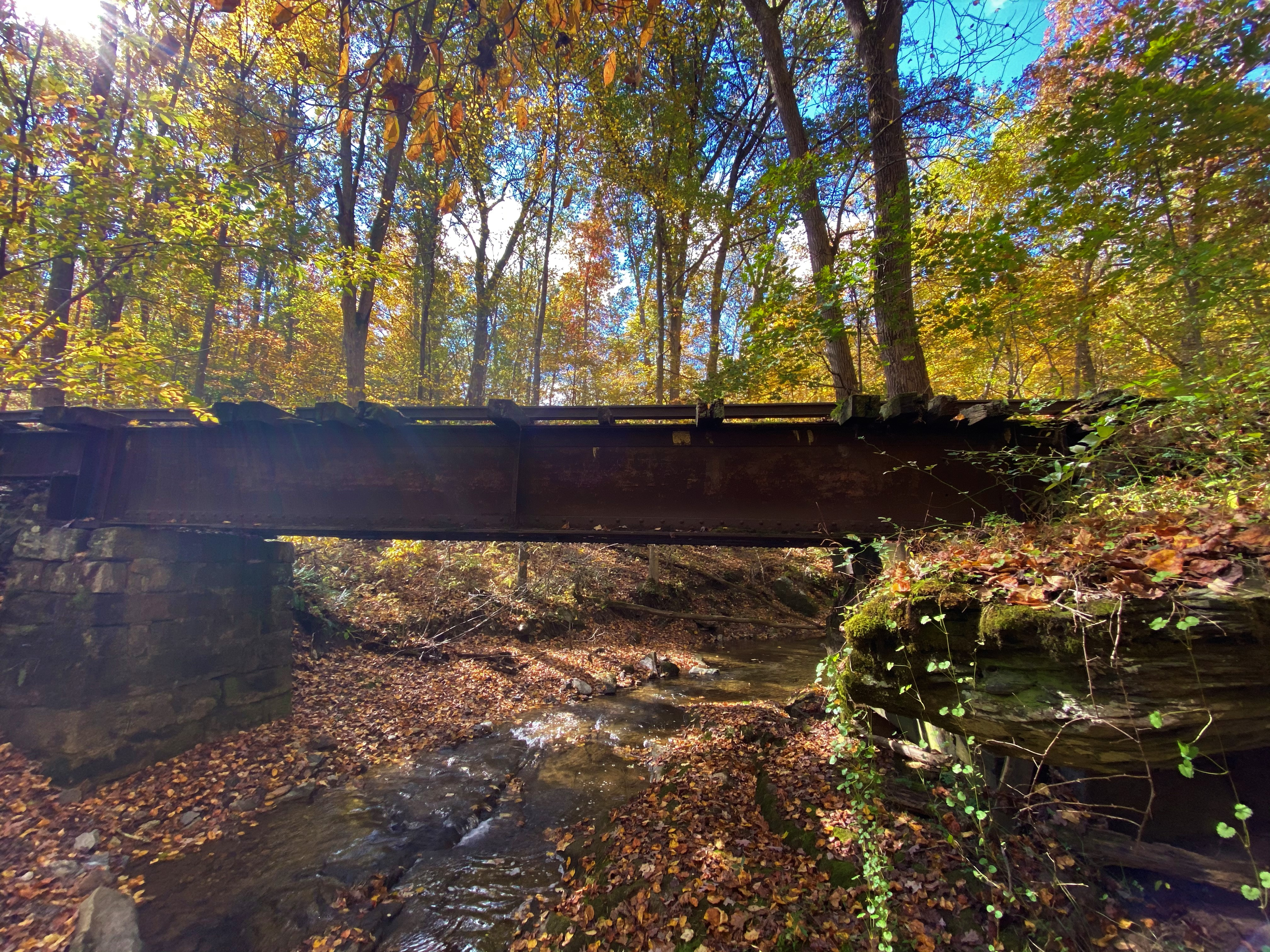

- Location within Pennsylvania Location within the United States
- Location: Maryland and Pennsylvania railroad tracks over Scott Creek, west of Watson's Corner and south of Pennsylvania Route 851, Peach Bottom Township, Pennsylvania
- Coordinates: 39°44′46″N 76°20′29″W
- Area: less than one acre
- Built: c. 1909
- Architect: S.M. Manifold, John Barnett, et al.
- Architectural style: Girder
- MPS: Railroad Resources of York County MPS
- NRHP reference No.: 95000551
- Added to NRHP: May 4, 1995

Scott Creek Bridge-North, Maryland and Pennsylvania Railroad is a historic railroad bridge in Peach Bottom Township, York County, Pennsylvania. It was built about 1909. The girder bridge with stone abutments was built by the Maryland and Pennsylvania Railroad and crosses Scott Creek.

It was added to the National Register of Historic Places in 1995.
