= Rehoboth Welsh Choir =

The Rehoboth Welsh Choir (Welsh: Côr Cymraeg Rehoboth) is a concert choir based in Delta, Pennsylvania, United States. It was founded in 1984. It is performs in the greater Philadelphia, Baltimore, and Washington DC metro areas.

The Choir sings in Welsh and English and is based in the old Welsh Chapel where they participate in Cymanfa Ganu and perform in concert. The choir toured Wales in 2013 and participated in the Smithsonian Folklife festival in 2010.

The Choir also performed at the wedding of Catherine Zeta-Jones and Michael Douglas.
