= Delta Historic District =

Historic district in Pennsylvania, United States

- U.S. National Register of Historic Places
- U.S. Historic district
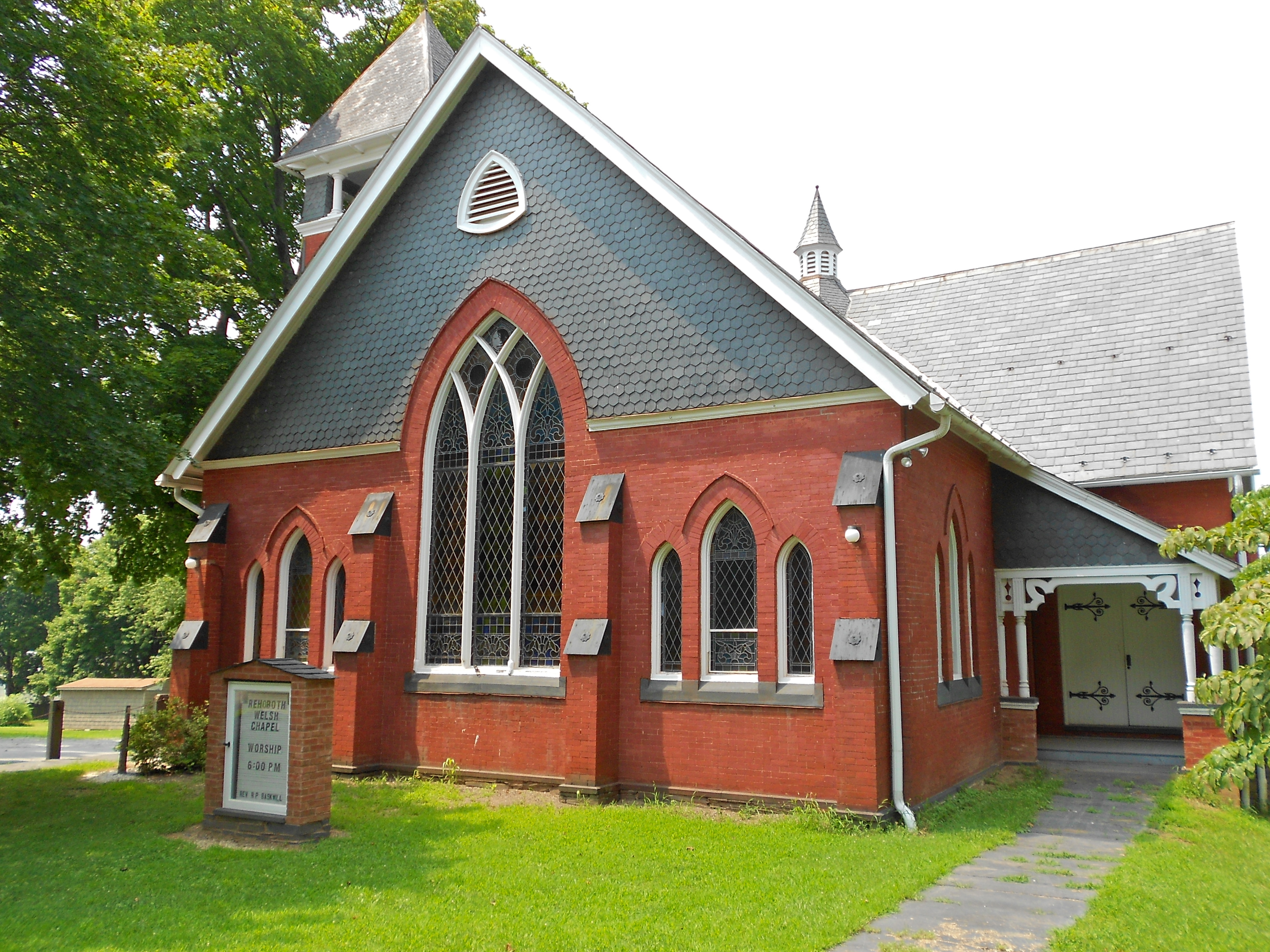
- Welsh Chapel at the northern end of the district

- Location within Pennsylvania Location within the United States
- Location: Main St., Delta, Pennsylvania, U.S.
- Coordinates: 39°43′27″N 76°19′53″W
- Area: 71.3 acres (28.9 ha)
- Architectural style: Greek Revival and Late Victorian
- NRHP reference No.: 83002288
- Added to NRHP: September 15, 1983

Delta Historic District is a national historic district located at Delta in York County, Pennsylvania. The district includes 137 collective buildings, mostly constructed between 1875 and 1895. The buildings are primarily frame and clapboard structures set upon a slate foundation and topped with slate shingle roof. They are reflective of a number of popular architectural styles including the Greek Revival and Late Victorian style. The use of slate reflects the prominence of that industry on the local economy.

It was listed on the National Register of Historic Places in 1983.

Video of the district from north to south.
