= Peach Bottom Township, Pennsylvania =

Township in Pennsylvania, US

Coordinates: 39°44′00″N 76°17′59″W

- Township
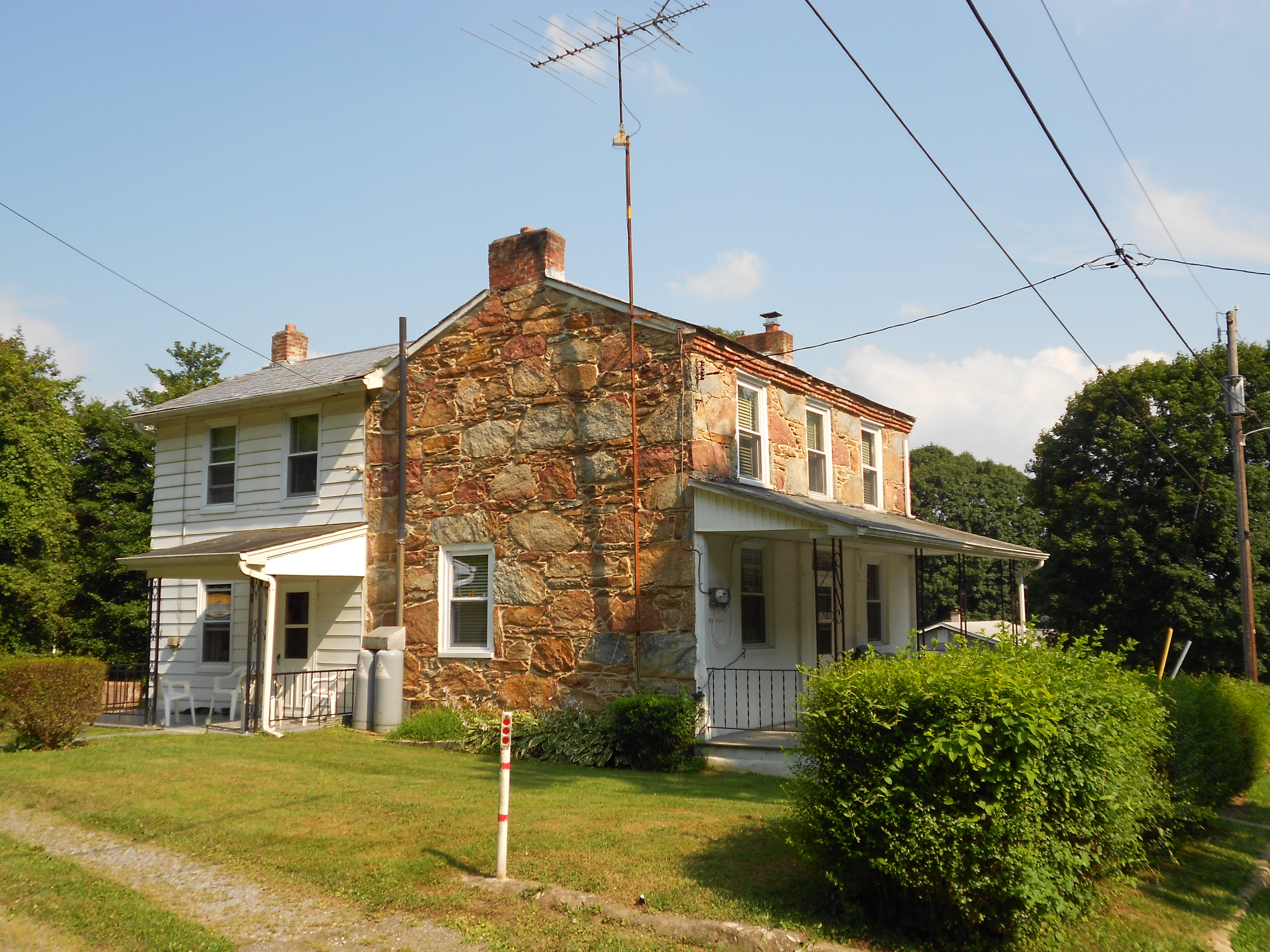
- One of the four Coulsontown Cottages in Coulsontown

- Location in York County and the state of Pennsylvania.
- Country: United States
- State: Pennsylvania
- County: York
- Settled: 1735
- Incorporated: 1815

Government
  - Type: Board of Supervisors

Area
  - Total: 29.76 sq mi (77.08 km^{2})
  - Land: 29.21 sq mi (75.66 km^{2})
  - Water: 0.54 sq mi (1.41 km^{2})

Population (2020)
  - Total: 4,966 ▲
  - Estimate (2023): 5,021
  - Density: 169.5/sq mi (65.43/km^{2})
- Time zone: UTC-5 (Eastern (EST))
  - Summer (DST): UTC-4 (EDT)
- Area code: 717
- FIPS code: 42-133-58560
- Website: https://www.peachbottomtownship.org/

Historical population
Census	Pop.	Note	%±
2000	4,412		—
2010	4,813		9.1%
2020	4,966		3.2%
2023 (est.)	5,021		1.1%
U.S. Decennial Census

Peach Bottom Township is a township in York County, Pennsylvania, 60 miles (97 km) south of Harrisburg. The population was 4,966 at the 2020 census.

Peach Bottom Township was so named on account of peach trees growing near a river bottom. Peach Bottom Nuclear Generating Station was built in 1958.

== History ==
The Coulsontown Cottages Historic District, Delta Trestle Bridge, Maryland and Pennsylvania Railroad, and Scott Creek Bridge-North, Maryland and Pennsylvania Railroad are listed on the National Register of Historic Places.

== Geography ==
According to the United States Census Bureau, the township has a total area of 29.6 square miles (77 km^{2}), of which 29.2 square miles (76 km^{2}) is land and 0.4 square miles (1.0 km^{2}), or 1.28%, is water. The southern boundary of the township is the Maryland-Pennsylvania border (the Mason–Dixon line), and the eastern border is the Susquehanna River. The township surrounds on three sides the borough of Delta, located along the state line. It contains the census-designated place of Susquehanna Trails.

== Demographics ==
As of the census of 2000, there were 4,412 people, 1,528 households, and 1,216 families living in the township. The population density was 151.0 inhabitants per square mile (58.3/km^{2}). There were 1,852 housing units at an average density of 63.4 per square mile (24.5/km^{2}). The racial makeup of the township was 96.60% White, 1.99% African American, 0.36% Native American, 0.32% Asian, 0.09% from other races, and 0.63% from two or more races. Hispanic or Latino of any race were 0.57% of the population.

There were 1,528 households, out of which 42.0% had children under the age of 18 living with them, 67.1% were married couples living together, 6.5% had a female householder with no husband present, and 20.4% were non-families. 16.4% of all households were made up of individuals, and 6.4% had someone living alone who was 65 years of age or older. The average household size was 2.87 and the average family size was 3.20.

In the township the population was spread out, with 29.2% under the age of 18, 6.3% from 18 to 24, 33.7% from 25 to 44, 21.3% from 45 to 64, and 9.5% who were 65 years of age or older. The median age was 36 years. For every 100 females there were 106.9 males. For every 100 females age 18 and over, there were 106.5 males.

The median income for a household in the township was $42,778, and the median income for a family was $45,753. Males had a median income of $35,043 versus $24,468 for females. The per capita income for the township was $17,005. About 2.5% of families and 3.9% of the population were below the poverty line, including 2.4% of those under age 18 and 2.8% of those age 65 or over.
