= Maryland Central Railroad =

Railroad in Pennsylvania

Overview
- Headquarters: Baltimore
- Locale: Baltimore, northern Maryland and York County, Pennsylvania
- Dates of operation: 1882–1891
- Successor: Baltimore and Lehigh Railroad

Technical
- Track gauge: 3 ft (914 mm)
- Length: 45 miles (72 km)

The Maryland Central Railroad (MCRR) was a 19th-century 3 ft (914 mm) narrow gauge railroad in Maryland, with a small track section in Pennsylvania. It operated freight and passenger trains between Baltimore and Delta, Pennsylvania.

== History ==
The Maryland Central was chartered by the Maryland General Assembly in 1867 to build a railroad from Baltimore to Philadelphia. It was not successful at raising sufficient funds for construction through the 1870s. (A competing railroad, the Philadelphia, Wilmington and Baltimore, had the same objective and had completed a bridge over the Susquehanna River in 1866.) Another company, the Baltimore and Delta Railway began building a 3 ft (914 mm) gauge line in 1878 to reach slate quarries in Delta, and to interchange with the Peach Bottom Railway. The southern portions of the Baltimore & Delta opened in 1882, but the company needed additional funds for completion. It merged with the Maryland Central in August 1882.

MCRR continued the construction northward and reached Bel Air, Maryland in 1883. Passenger train service between Baltimore and Bel Air began on June 21, 1883. The railroad commenced U.S. mail service in July 1883. The remaining un-built route of 17 miles, from Bel Air to Delta, involved some difficult construction work, but the line was completed by December of that year. The track in Pennsylvania was owned by a subsidiary, the Slate Ridge and Delta Railway. Passenger trains began running from Baltimore to Delta in January 1884.

The company experienced financial difficulties and entered receivership in October 1884. MCRR was sold at auction in 1888 and a new company, the Maryland Central Railway, was formed.

In 1889 the Maryland Central acquired control of the York and Peach Bottom Railway (Y&PB), the successor to the Peach Bottom Railway, and which terminated at Delta. Through-service trains between York, Pennsylvania and Baltimore began operation in May 1889. The Maryland Central owners were interested in expanding further north into Pennsylvania, and they made plans for a merger with the Y&PB. In 1891 the Y&PB and Maryland Central merged to form a new corporation, the Baltimore and Lehigh Railroad.

== Successor lines ==
The Baltimore and Lehigh encountered financial problems in 1893 and entered bankruptcy. The Maryland and Pennsylvania sections of the railroad were sold off separately in 1894. The York Southern Railroad acquired the Pennsylvania portion, and the Maryland portion was acquired by a new company, the Baltimore and Lehigh Railway.

In 1895 the York Southern converted its tracks to standard gauge, and in 1900 the Baltimore and Lehigh did likewise on the Maryland tracks.

The York Southern merged with the Baltimore and Lehigh in 1901, to form the Maryland and Pennsylvania Railroad. The new company announced that it planned to build a branch line from Red Lion to Columbia, Pennsylvania, to connect with the Reading Railroad. However, this idea was not implemented and the railroad never succeeded in expanding northward beyond York.

== See also ==
- List of defunct Pennsylvania railroads
- List of Maryland railroads
