= Maryland and Pennsylvania Railroad =

Historical railroad in Maryland and Pennsylvainia

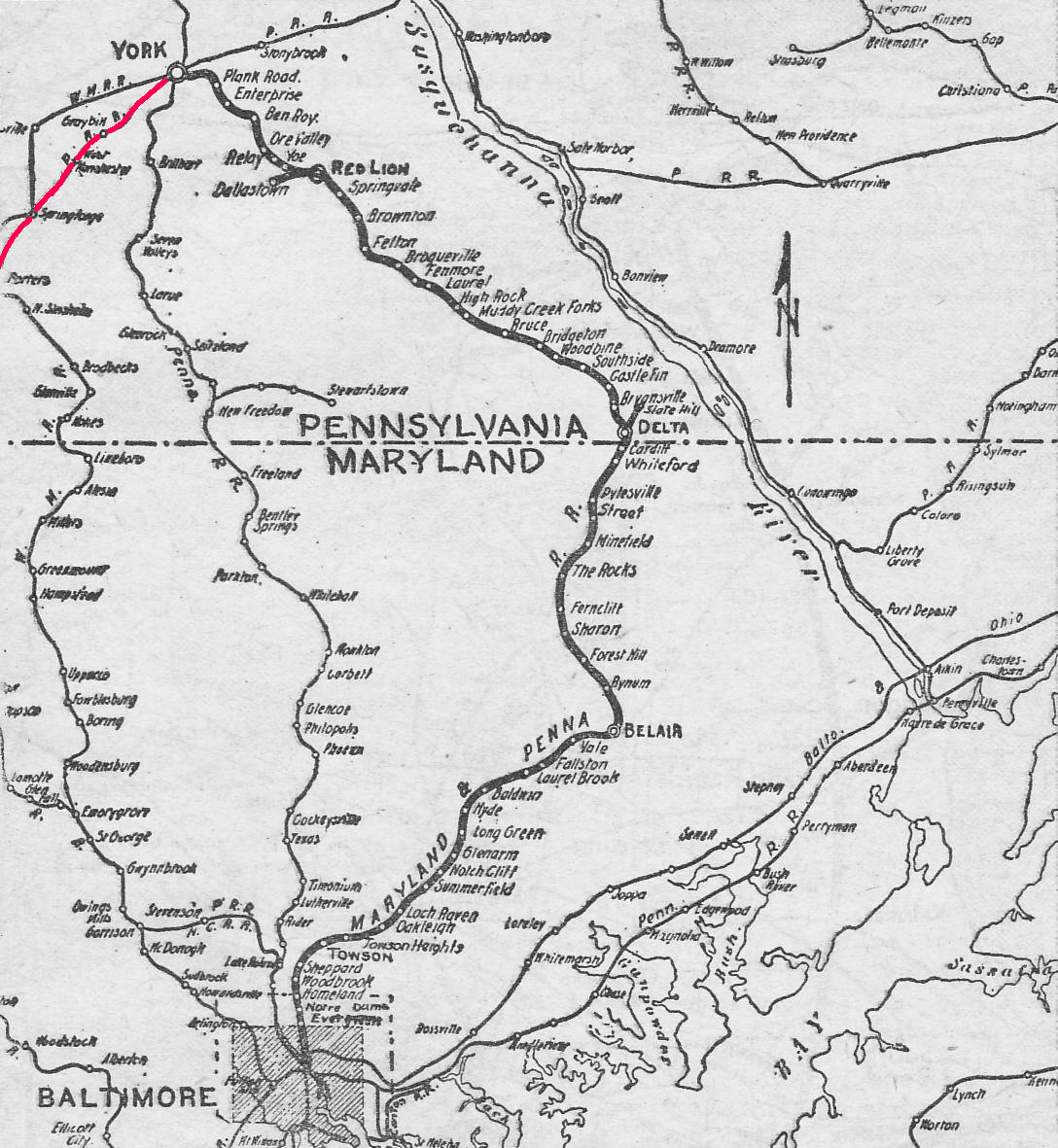
- The original Ma and Pa, with the former PRR's York–Hanover, Pennsylvania branch highlighted

Overview
- Headquarters: York, Pennsylvania formerly Baltimore, Maryland
- Reporting mark: MPA
- Locale: York County in Pennsylvania, and Baltimore and Harford counties and Baltimore City in Maryland
- Dates of operation: 1901–1999
- Predecessor: York Southern Railroad, Baltimore and Lehigh Railway
- Successor: York Railway

Technical
- Track gauge: 4 ft 8 1/2 in (1,435 mm) standard gauge
- Length: Baltimore–York line: 77.2 miles (124.2 km); York–Hanover line: 19 miles (31 km)

The Maryland and Pennsylvania Railroad (reporting mark MPA), colloquially known as the "Ma and Pa", was an American short-line railroad between York and Hanover, Pennsylvania, formerly operating passenger and freight trains on its original line between York and Baltimore, Maryland, from 1901 until the 1950s. The Ma and Pa was popular with railfans in the 1930s and 1940s for its antique equipment and curving, picturesque right-of-way through the hills of rural Maryland and Pennsylvania. Reflecting its origin as the unintended product of the merger of two 19th-century narrow-gauge railways, the meandering main line took 77.2 miles (124 km) to connect Baltimore and York (via Bel Air, Maryland and Delta, Pennsylvania), although the two cities are only 45 miles (72 km) apart.

Passenger service on the railroad was discontinued on August 31, 1954, and its trackage in Maryland was abandoned in June 1958. The Maryland and Pennsylvania Railroad acquired a former 19-mile (31 km) Pennsylvania Railroad (PRR) branch line between York and Hanover in 1976, now operated by a successor corporation, York Railway. Most of the remaining original line in Pennsylvania was abandoned by 1984.

== History ==
=== 19th-century predecessors ===
The Maryland and Pennsylvania Railroad was formed from two earlier 19th-century 3 ft (914 mm) narrow gauge railways: the Baltimore & Delta Railway, later the Baltimore and Lehigh Railroad, and the York and Peach Bottom Railway, later the York Southern Railroad. Construction of the Baltimore & Delta Railway began in 1881, and passenger trains between Baltimore and Towson, Maryland, began on April 17, 1882. Later that year the company was merged into the Maryland Central Railroad. The line was extended northward to Bel Air, Maryland, on June 21, 1883, and the following January, the line was completed to Delta, Pennsylvania.

In Pennsylvania, the Peach Bottom Railway was incorporated in 1871. The railway's Middle Division laid narrow gauge track between York and Red Lion by August 1874 and completed its line southward to Delta in 1876. It went bankrupt in 1881 and was reorganized as the York and Peach Bottom Railway (Y&PB) in 1882. The Y&PB merged with the Maryland Central Railway in 1891, becoming the Baltimore and Lehigh, and the new company operated trains on the combined track between York and Baltimore.

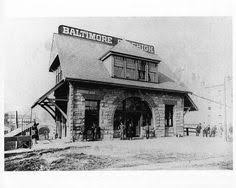
Baltimore and Lehigh Railway's Baltimore passenger station in the 1890s, later the Ma and Pa's station until demolished in 1937

Both railroads struggled with light freight traffic and financial difficulties in the 1890s. Because of their narrow gauge construction, the Baltimore and Lehigh Railway and York Southern Railroad could not interchange freight cars with other lines. The two companies finally converted to standard gauge between 1898–1900 and subsequently merged to form the Maryland and Pennsylvania Railroad on February 12, 1901. The result was the circuitous, 77.2-mile (124 km) "Ma and Pa" route between Baltimore and York; in comparison, the competing Pennsylvania Railroad's Northern Central line between the two cities was 56 miles (90 km). The completed line had grades of up to 2.3 percent, and 55 sharp curves of 16–20 degrees; most mainline railroads at the time seldom exceed six degree turns.

=== 20th century ===
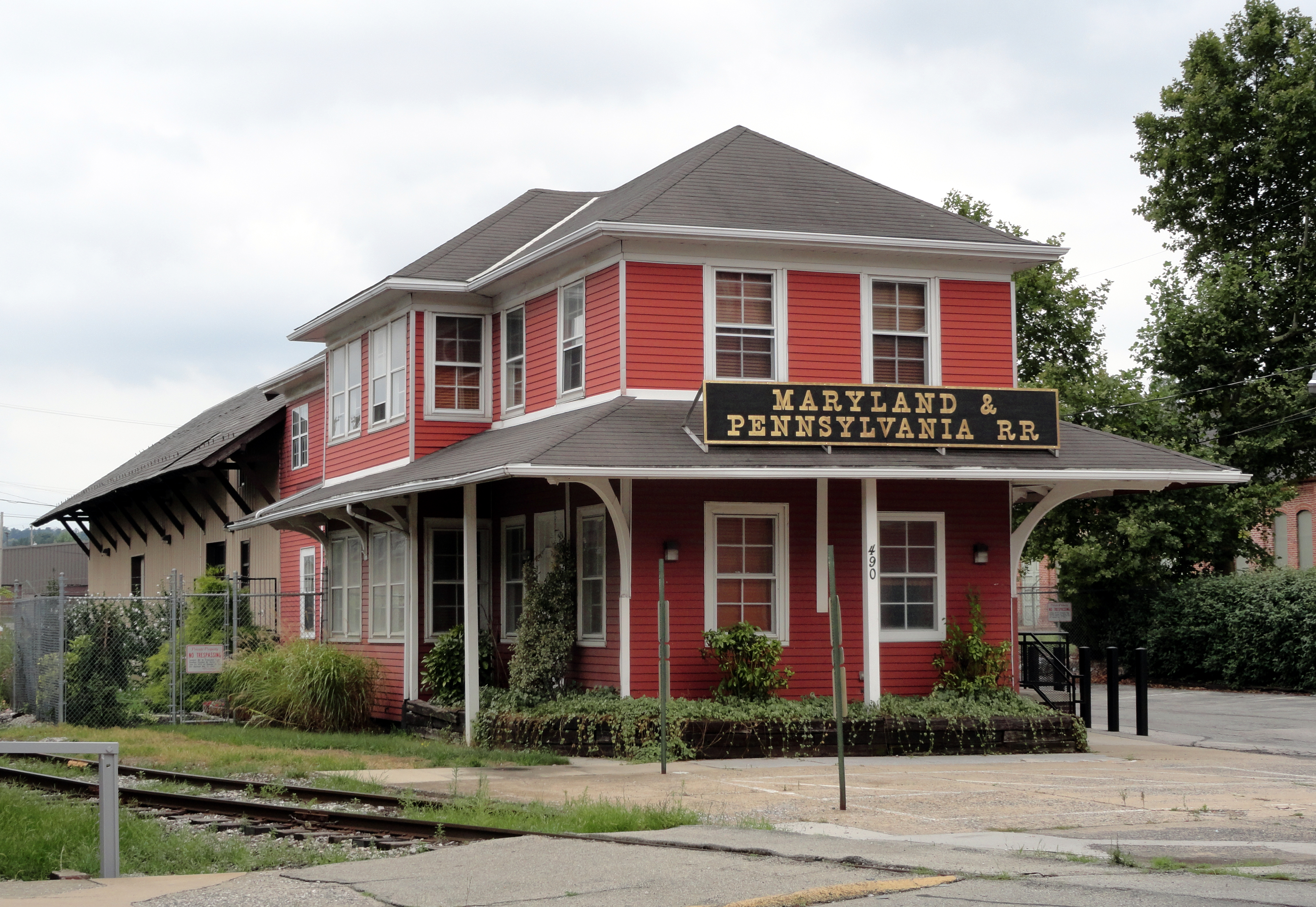
Ma and Pa depot and freight shed in York, Pennsylvania

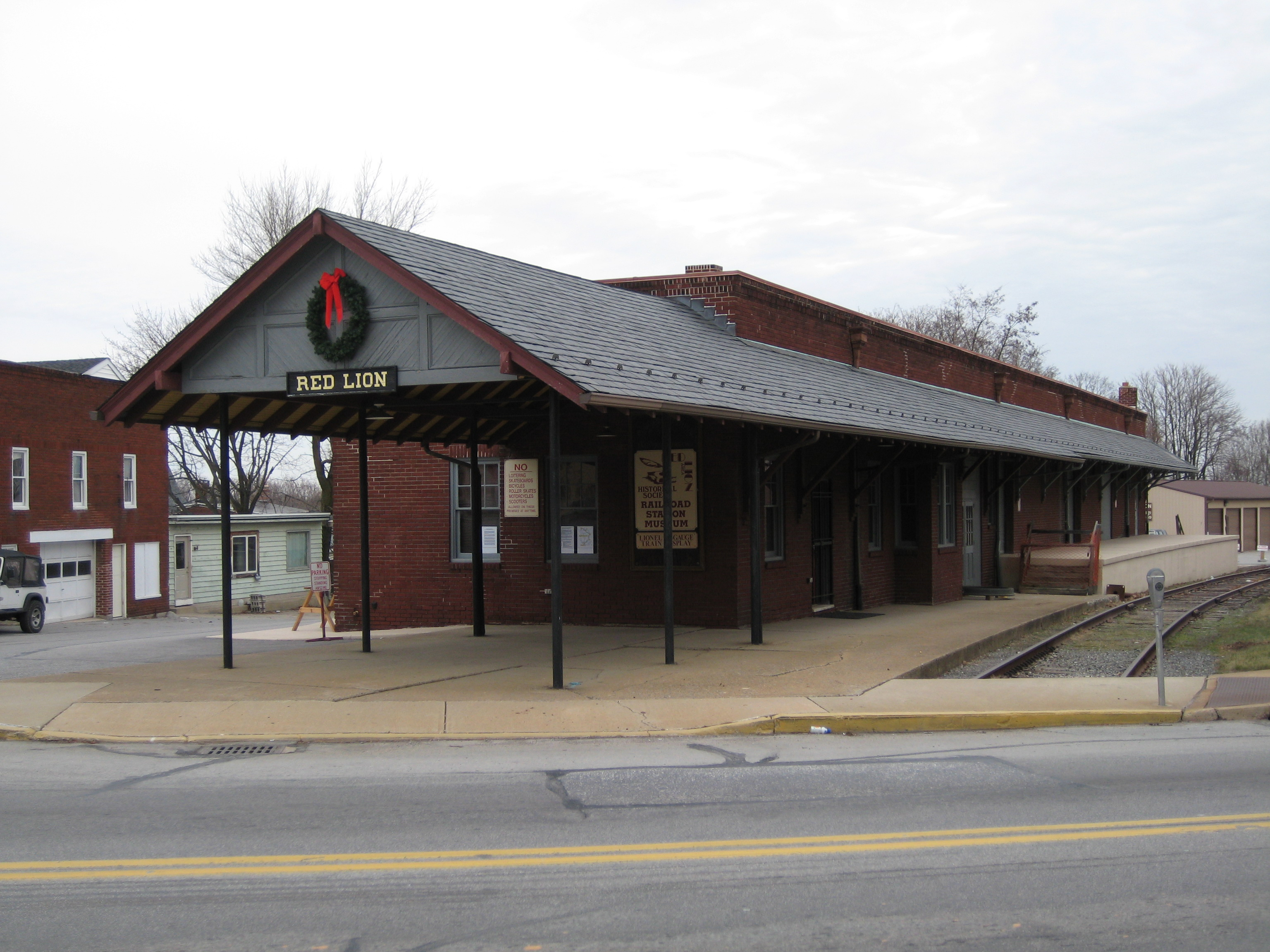
Former Ma and Pa Station in Red Lion, Pennsylvania

Following the merger, the Ma and Pa operated through passenger and freight trains between York and Baltimore, as well as local trains at each end of the line, hauling mail and express, slate, marble, anthracite coal, lumber, furniture, and agricultural products to market. Particularly on the Pennsylvania Division (Delta–York), slate from Delta and manufactured goods from Red Lion and York were mainstays of the railroad's outbound freight traffic. On the Maryland Division, inbound anthracite coal deliveries accounted for a significant volume of car loadings, along with milk from the many dairy farms in the area. One early morning train from Fallston boarded more than 1,100 gallons of milk daily, and was dubbed the "Milky Way". The line was profitable, and traffic volume was such that additional locomotives became necessary.

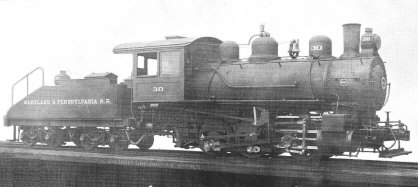
Baldwin 0-6-0 locomotive #30, built in 1913 and owned by the Ma & Pa until 1956, was typical of the line's aged equipment.

The Ma and Pa acquired two 0-6-0 Baldwin switcher locomotives in 1913. The next year, three 2-8-0 Baldwin "Consolidation" locomotives were added to the roster. At its peak, the railroad had sixteen locomotives, 160 pieces of rolling stock, and 573 employees.

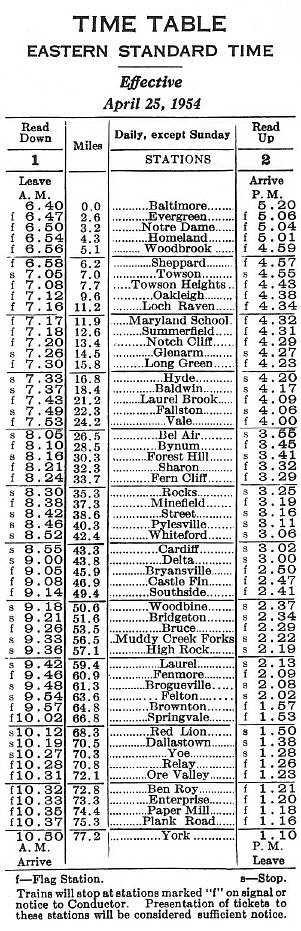
Final "Ma and Pa" passenger timetable, 1954

With increasing competition from trucks and automobiles in the 1920s, passenger and less-than-carload freight volume began to decline. The Ma and Pa substituted more economical, self-propelled gas-electric passenger cars for steam-powered passenger trains in 1927–1928. Carload freight volume increased in the 1920s, however, as more industries appeared along the line, and earnings were strong enough for the company to declare dividends in 1930 and 1931. This period of relative prosperity ended during the Great Depression; the railroad's gross revenues fell by half from 1932 to 1935.

In the mid-1930s, the Ma and Pa became a favorite of railfans, who were attracted to its hilly, curving line through rural Maryland and Pennsylvania. The railroad offered several popular fan excursions pulled by its elderly steam locomotives.

Following the end of World War II, the Ma and Pa acquired four diesel locomotives for more efficient operations, but traffic declined significantly. After the Ma and Pa's mail contract was cancelled by the United States Postal Service, the railroad discontinued all passenger service on August 31, 1954. A passenger on its last passenger train recalled that riders came from as far away as Boston and Washington, D.C., to participate in the historic event, along with members of the National Railway Historical Society. The line's last steam engine was retired on November 29, 1956.

The last "Ma and Pa" train departs Towson, Maryland, on June 11, 1958

The lack of traffic on the railroad's 44-mile (71 km) Baltimore–Whiteford, Maryland division in the 1950s was particularly acute. One of the last major shipments to occur on the division was of Indiana limestone for the construction of the Cathedral of Mary Our Queen, Baltimore in 1956.The Baltimore–Whiteford segment was finally abandoned altogether on June 11, 1958, leaving only the stone abutments where the tracks crossed York Road in Towson on a steel girder bridge; a commemorative plaque was placed on one of the abutments in 1999.

In the 1960s, the Ma and Pa Railroad continued to solicit business along its line for its remaining 34.8-mile (56.0 km) Whiteford–York segment, almost entirely in Pennsylvania. In 1964, it added a siding 905 feet (276 m) long near Red Lion to serve a new cigar box factory. In 1971, the Maryland and Pennsylvania Railroad was acquired by Emons Industries. Primarily hauling slate from a quarry at Delta, and furniture from a factory in Red Lion, the Ma and Pa's Pennsylvania Division continued to operate until June 14, 1978, when it was reduced to the 9-mile (14 km) section between York and Red Lion. The Red Lion freight station was closed on November 1, 1980; when the town's furniture factory closed in 1984, the Red Lion section of the railroad was also abandoned.

== Current status ==
The Emons-controlled Maryland and Pennsylvania Railroad acquired 19 miles (31 km) of a former PRR branch line between York and Hanover, Pennsylvania in 1976 from Penn Central. In December 1999, Emons merged its M&P subsidiary with another area short-line, Yorkrail, forming the York Railway. In 2002, Genesee and Wyoming gained control of the 42-mile (68 km) York Railway, including the former M&P Railroad trackage between York–Hanover. The York Railway currently serves 40 online rail customers and connects with the Norfolk Southern and CSX railroads. Most of the former PRR Hanover branch between the village of Bair and Hanover is now out-of-service, but a small portion is still used to serve a BAE Systems factory in Bair occasionally. The York County Rail Trail Authority acquired the abandoned York Railway route between Bair and Hanover in 2020, and removed the rails in 2022. As of 2024 the authority is designing sections of the planned Hanover Trolley Trail, with one section under construction.

A small, 3-mile (5 km) fragment of the original railroad line still exists between Laurel and Muddy Creek Forks in York County, Pennsylvania, maintained by the Maryland and Pennsylvania Railroad Preservation Society. Founded by enthusiasts and former employees in 1986, the group has restored the Muddy Creek Forks station and maintains a small collection of rolling stock there. The preserved Red Lion, Pennsylvania, station is now a museum operated by the Red Lion Area Historical Society. Other remaining structures along the old right-of-way include scattered bridge abutments and some station buildings, such as the former railroad station and general store in Hydes, Maryland. Another Maryland station, at Glen Arm, still stands. Built in 1909, it was designated by the Baltimore County Council on August 5, 2019, as a protected historical landmark. A 6-mile (10 km) long section of the Ma and Pa's old right-of-way was converted in 1998 to a rail trail in Harford County, Maryland, now designated as part of the Ma & Pa Trail.

In Baltimore, Ma and Pa track remnants and the old roundhouse, freight shed, and yard shed remain along Falls Road near Baltimore Penn Station. The Baltimore Streetcar Museum now operates in this area.

In York County, the Muddy Creek Bridge, Delta Trestle Bridge, and Scott Creek Bridge-North were added to the National Register of Historic Places in 1995.

== Gallery ==
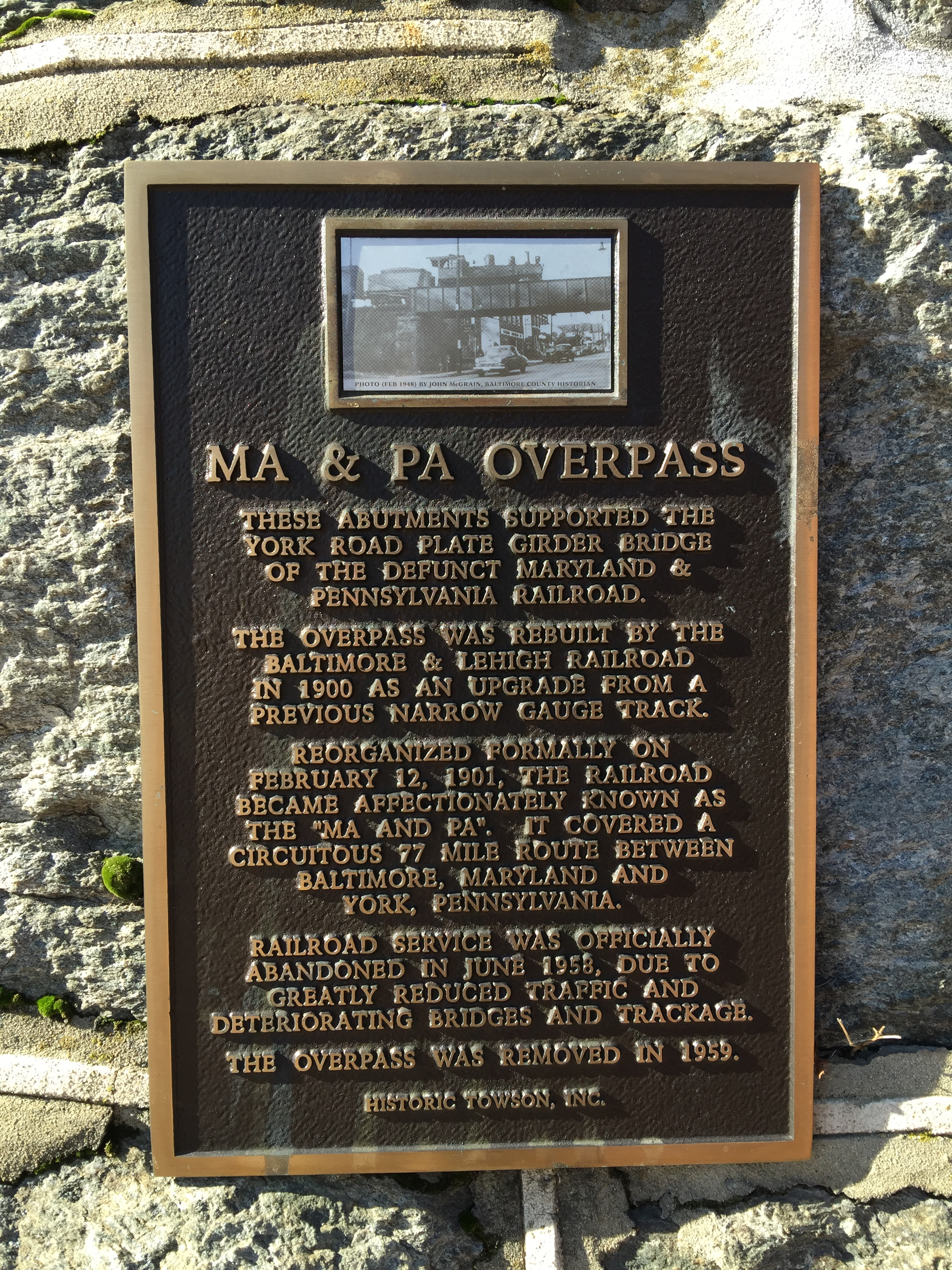
Ma and Pa Abutment Commemorative Plaque in Towson

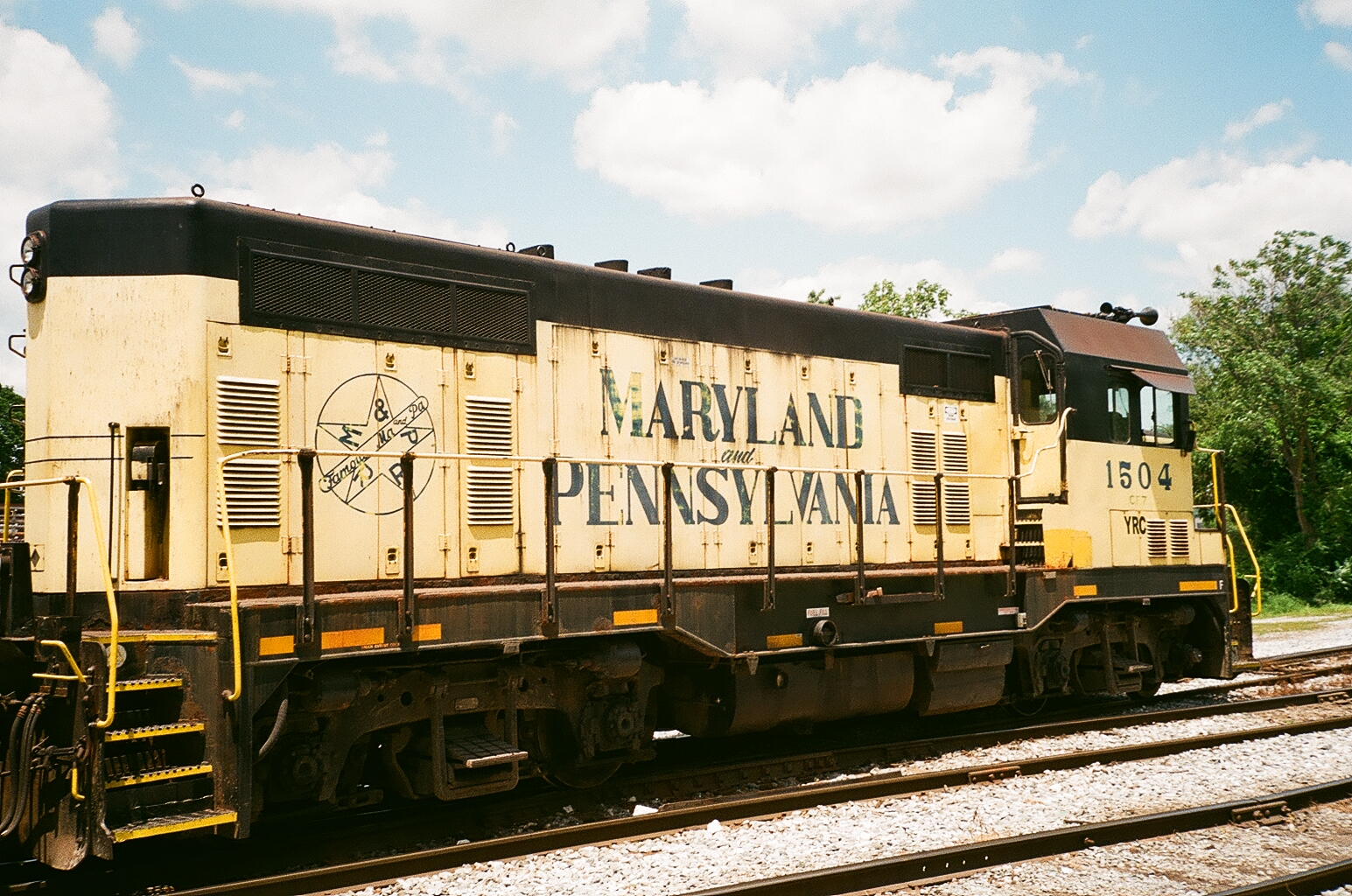
Maryland & Pennsylvania CF7 operating in York, Pa.

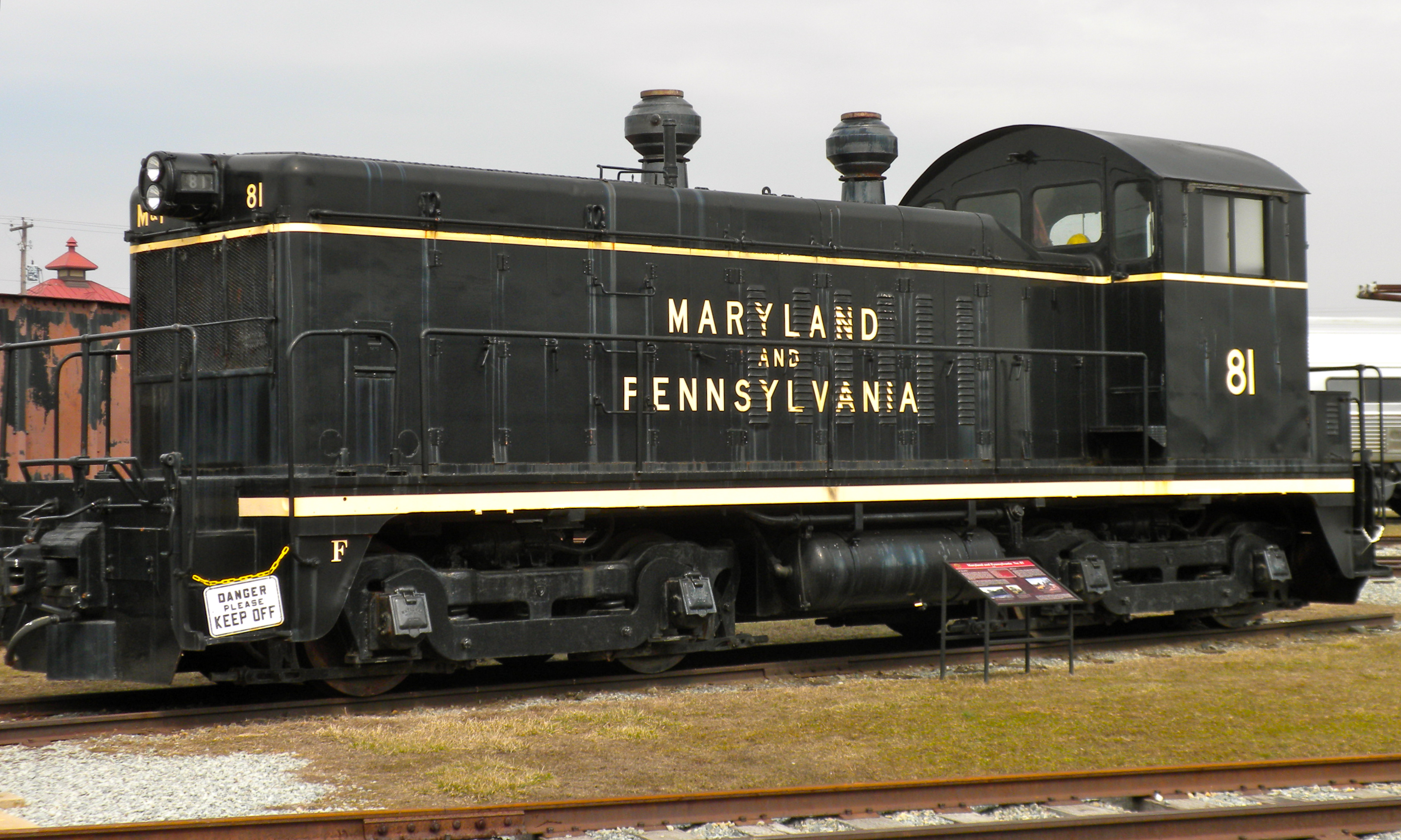
Locomotive #81, an EMD NW2 acquired in 1946, now at the Railroad Museum of Pennsylvania

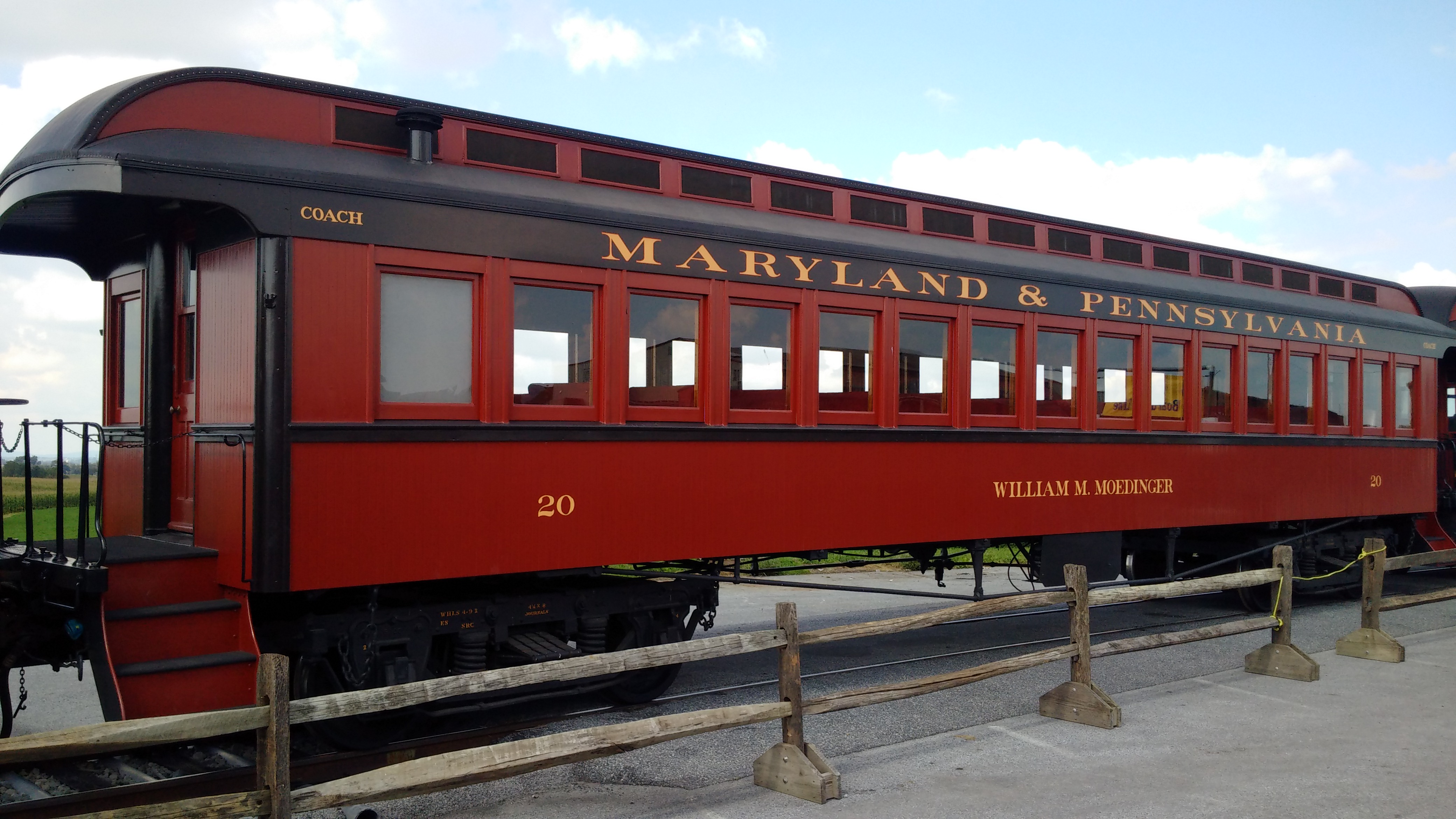
Maryland & Pennsylvania Coach #20 at the Strasburg Railroad in 2017

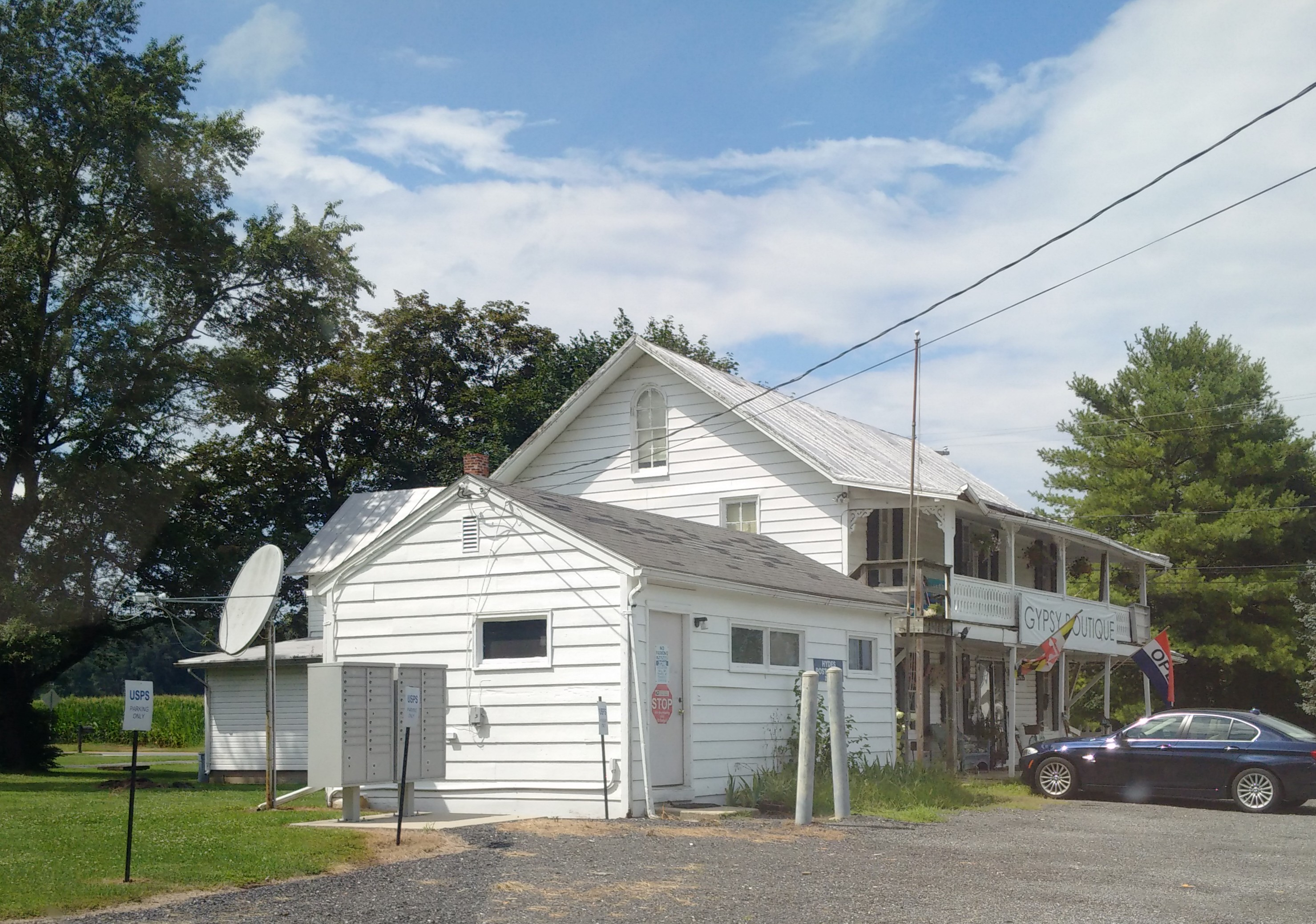
The former Hydes station

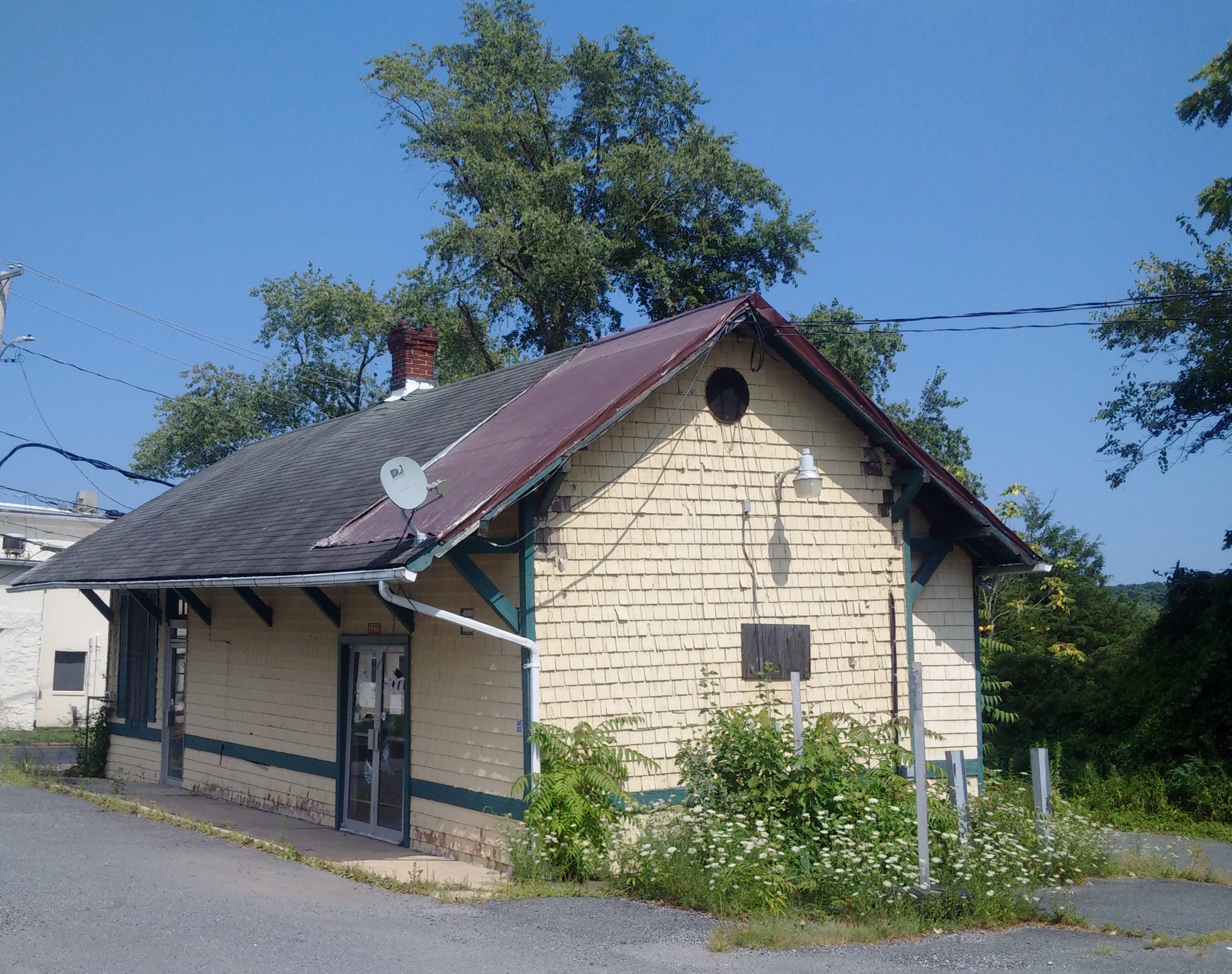
The Glen Arm station

== See also ==
- "Ma and Pa" Railroad in Towson, Md.
