= Coulsontown Cottages Historic District =

Historic district in Pennsylvania, United States

- U.S. National Register of Historic Places
- U.S. Historic district
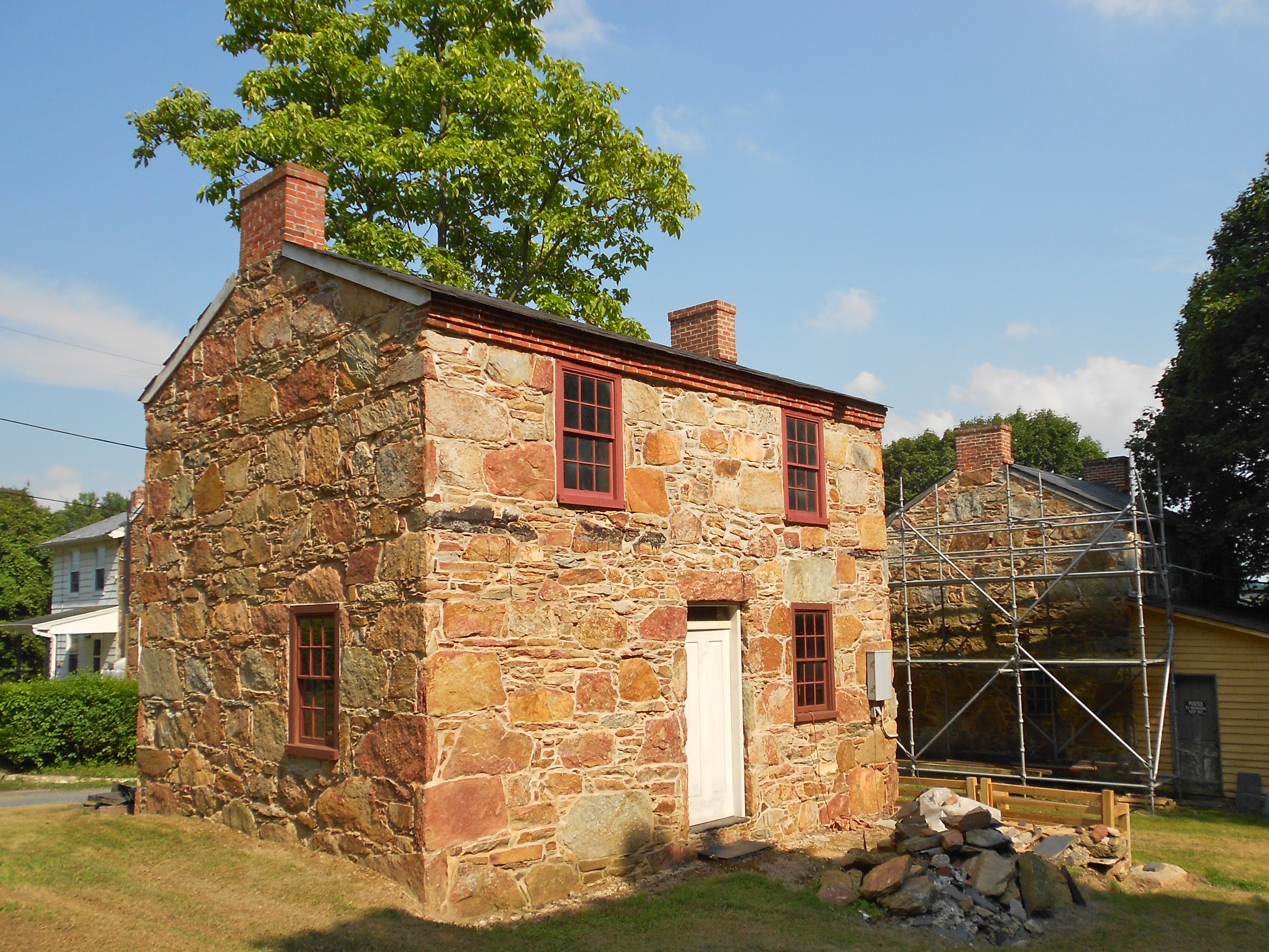
- One of the four cottages that make up the Coulsontown Cottages Historic District

- Location within Pennsylvania Location within the United States
- Location: Ridge Rd. and Main, east of Delta Peach Bottom Township, Pennsylvania
- Coordinates: 39°43′29″N 76°18′28″W
- Area: 2.1 acres (0.85 ha)
- Built: 1845; 181 years ago
- Architect: Multiple
- NRHP reference No.: 85000175
- Added to NRHP: January 31, 1985

Coulsontown Cottages Historic District is a national historic district located at Coulsontown in Peach Bottom Township in York County, Pennsylvania. The district includes four contributing buildings. They are stone cottages built between 1845 and 1865. They are two-story dwellings, 2/3 by 1 bay, with slate-covered gable roofs and end chimneys. There are two rooms downstairs and two rooms upstairs.

It was listed on the National Register of Historic Places in 1985.
