= Susquehanna Trails, Pennsylvania =

Unincorporated place in Pennsylvania, US

Susquehanna Trails
- Census-designated place
- Location in York County and the U.S. state of Pennsylvania.
- Coordinates: 39°45′40″N 76°22′20″W
- Country: United States
- State: Pennsylvania
- County: York
- Township: Peach Bottom

Area
  - Total: 3.2 sq mi (8.2 km^{2})
  - Land: 3.2 sq mi (8.2 km^{2})

Population (2010)
  - Total: 2,264
  - Density: 720/sq mi (280/km^{2})
- Time zone: UTC-5 (Eastern (EST))
  - Summer (DST): UTC-4 (EDT)

Susquehanna Trails is a census-designated place (CDP) in York County, Pennsylvania, United States. The population was 2,264 at the 2010 census.

== Geography ==
Susquehanna Trails is located at 39°45′40″N 76°22′20″W (39.761121, -76.372205) in Peach Bottom Township. According to the United States Census Bureau, the CDP has a total area of 3.2 square miles (8.3 km^{2}), all land.

== Demographics ==
At the 2020 census and 2023 Community Survey 5-year estimates there were 2,179 people and 921 households living in the CDP. The population density was 702.9 inhabitants per square mile (271.4/km^{2}). There were 921 housing units at an average density of 297.1 per square mile (114.7/km^{2}). The racial makeup of the CDP was 90.55% White, 1.01% African American, 0.18% Native American, 0.46% Asian, 0.64% from other races, and 7.16% from two or more races. Hispanic or Latino of any race were 1.51%.

Of the 734 households 17.3% had children under the age of 18 living with them, 44.7% were married couples living together, 35.2% had a female householder with no husband, and 11.6% had a male householder with no spouse present. The average household size was 3.18.

The age distribution was 17.6% under the age of 18, 4.8% from 18 to 24, 46.8% from 25 to 44, 21.5% from 45 to 64, and 11.1% 65 or older. The median age was 34.7 years.

The median household income was $62,011. About 9.6% of the population were below the poverty line.
