= Hydes, Maryland =

Unincorporated community in Maryland, United States

- Unincorporated community
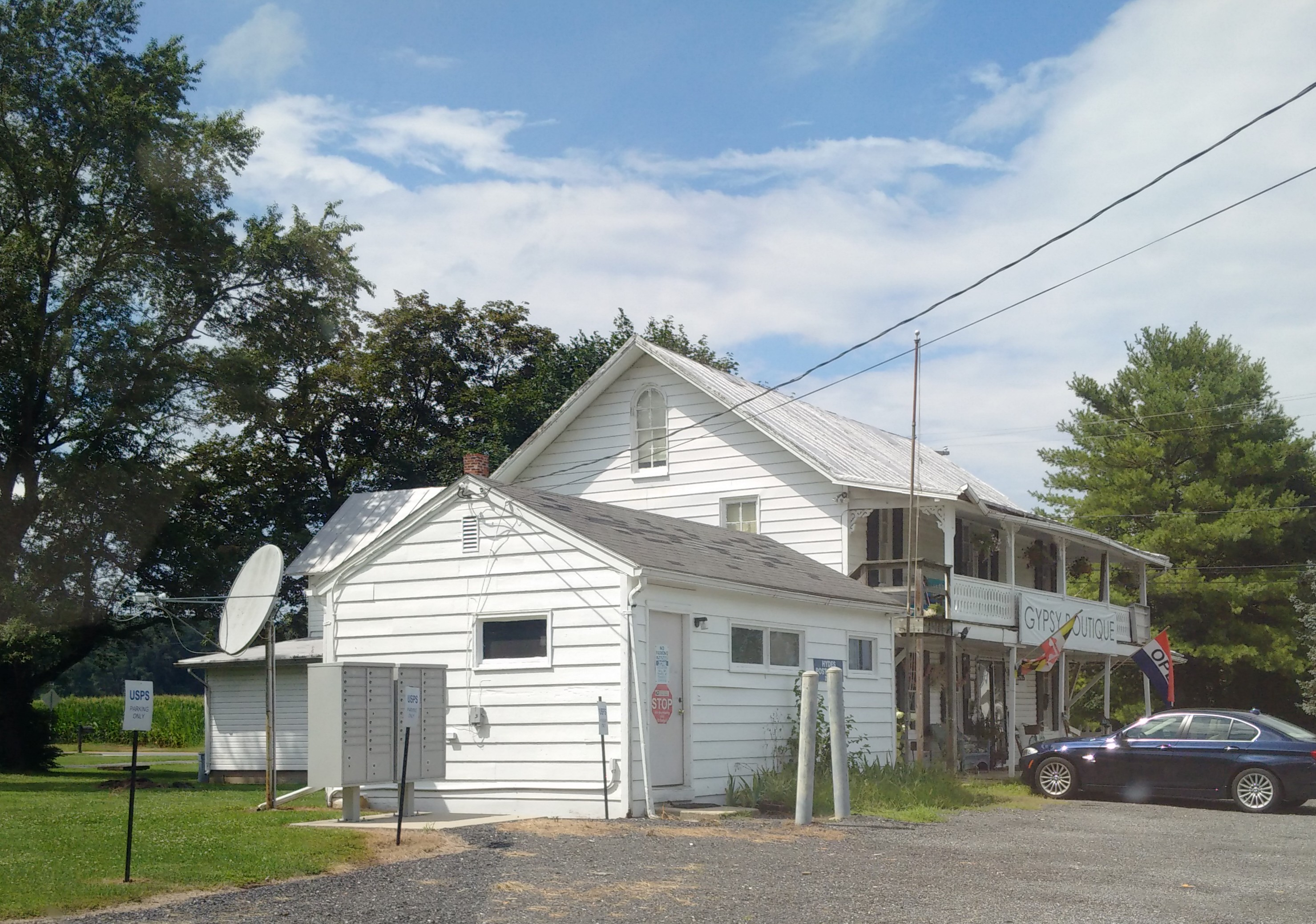
- Hydes Post Office (foreground) and the former Ma & Pa RR station and store

- Location within the State of Maryland Hydes, Maryland (the United States)
- Coordinates: 39°29′02″N 76°29′36″W
- Country: United States
- State: Maryland
- County: Baltimore
- Time zone: UTC-5 (Eastern (EST))
  - Summer (DST): UTC-4 (EDT)
- ZIP codes: 21082

Hydes is an unincorporated community in Baltimore County, Maryland, United States. It is located in the Long Green Valley. The USPS has assigned Hydes the postal code 21082. Saint John the Evangelist church is located in Hydes and is the oldest Roman Catholic Church in Baltimore County. Until 1958, this community was served by the Maryland and Pennsylvania Railroad at milepost 16.8. It is also home to several wineries, including Boordy and Dejon Vineyards.

Hydes is named for Samuel N. Hyde, an agronomist who developed a strain known as "Egyptian" sweet corn, canned by the F.B. Jenkins canning operation of Hydes.

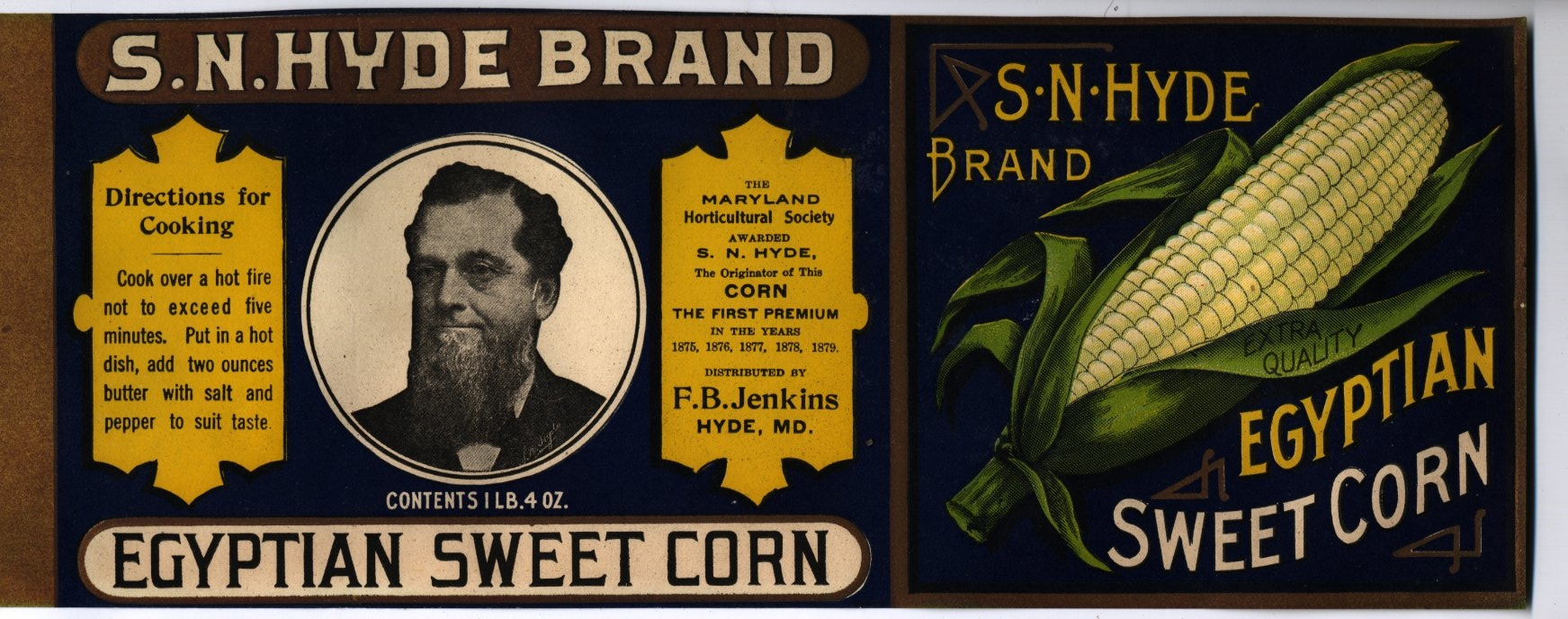
This is an image from a paper label for a can of S N Hyde Egyptian Sweet Corn.This can label was printed prior to 1900 and is in public domain due to its age. This can label was found under the front porch of the house that belonged to the F B Jenkins family, producers of the brand of canned "Egyptian Sweet Corn".
