= Baltimore and Lehigh Railroad =

Railroad in Maryland and Pennsylvania

Overview
- Headquarters: Baltimore
- Locale: Baltimore, northern Maryland and York County, Pennsylvania
- Dates of operation: 1891–1901
- Predecessor: Maryland Central Railroad, York and Peach Bottom Railway
- Successor: Maryland and Pennsylvania Railroad

Technical
- Track gauge: 3 ft (914 mm)
- Length: 84.4 mi (135.8 km)

The Baltimore and Lehigh Railroad (B&L) was a 19th-century, 3 ft (914 mm) narrow gauge railroad in Maryland and Pennsylvania. It operated freight and passenger trains on its main line between Baltimore and York, Pennsylvania.

== History ==
The Baltimore and Lehigh was the result of an 1891 merger between the Maryland Central Railway (MCRY) and the York and Peach Bottom Railway (Y&PB). The two lines shared a common terminus: Delta, Pennsylvania. Delta was the site of slate quarries which provided significant freight revenue for the railroads. The MCRY had acquired control of the Y&PB in 1889 and began running through-service trains between York and Baltimore. The Maryland Central owners were interested in expanding the line further north into Pennsylvania.

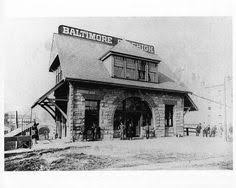
The Baltimore and Lehigh's passenger station in Baltimore, Maryland

The Baltimore and Lehigh experienced several serious accidents during its few years in operation. It also had acquired the liabilities from an accident of its predecessor, the Maryland Central. These expenses contributed to a bankruptcy action in 1893. The Maryland and Pennsylvania sections of the railroad were then sold off separately in 1894. The York Southern Railroad acquired the Pennsylvania portion, and the Maryland portion was acquired by a new company, the Baltimore and Lehigh Railway.

== Successor lines ==
In 1895 the York Southern converted its tracks to 4 ft 8 1/2 in (1,435 mm) standard gauge, and in 1900 the Baltimore and Lehigh Railway did likewise on the Maryland tracks.

The York Southern merged with the Baltimore and Lehigh Railway in 1901, to form the Maryland and Pennsylvania Railroad. The new company announced that it planned to build a branch line from Red Lion to Columbia, Pennsylvania, to connect with the Reading Railroad. However, this idea was not implemented and the railroad never succeeded in expanding northward beyond York.

== See also ==
- List of defunct Pennsylvania railroads
- List of Maryland railroads
