= Delta Trestle Bridge, Maryland and Pennsylvania Railroad =

- U.S. National Register of Historic Places
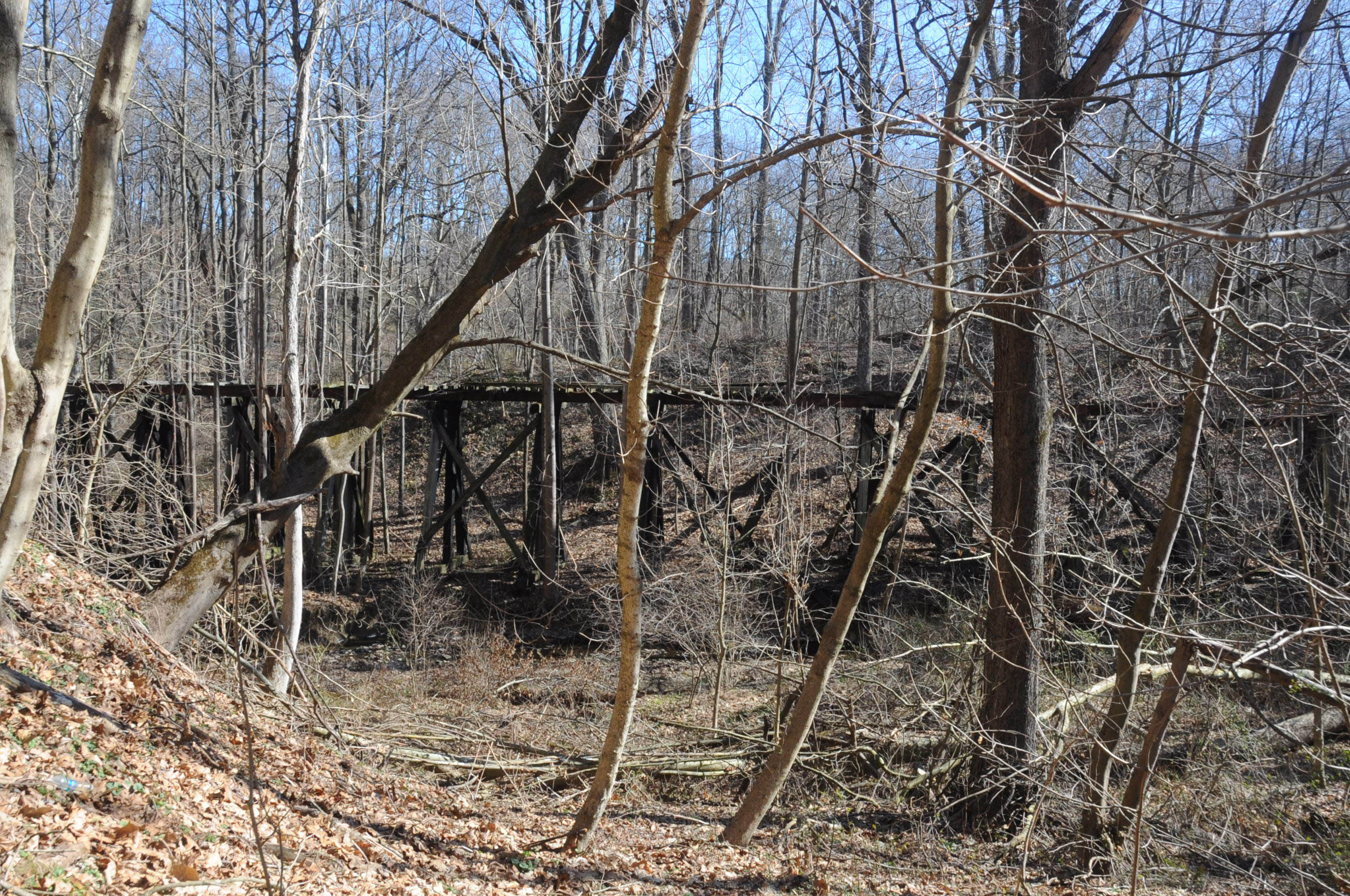

- Location within Pennsylvania Location within the United States
- Location: Maryland and Pennsylvania Railroad tracks over an unnamed stream, east of Bunker Hill Road, north of Delta, Peach Bottom Township, Pennsylvania
- Coordinates: 39°43′44″N 76°19′49″W
- Area: less than one acre
- Built: 1875
- Architect: S.M. Manifold, John A. Barnett
- Architectural style: Trestle
- MPS: Railroad Resources of York County MPS
- NRHP reference No.: 95000550
- Added to NRHP: May 4, 1995

Delta Trestle Bridge, Maryland and Pennsylvania Railroad is a historic wooden trestle railroad bridge in Peach Bottom Township, York County, Pennsylvania. It was built about 1875, and measures about 393-foot-long (120 m) overall. It was built by the Maryland and Pennsylvania Railroad to connect two rises of land divided by a ravine. It is one of only two trestle bridges to remain from the original railroad, the other being the Taylor trestle, in York Township, PA, between Red Lion, PA and Dallastown, PA.

It was added to the National Register of Historic Places in 1995.
