= Lancaster, Oxford and Southern Railway =

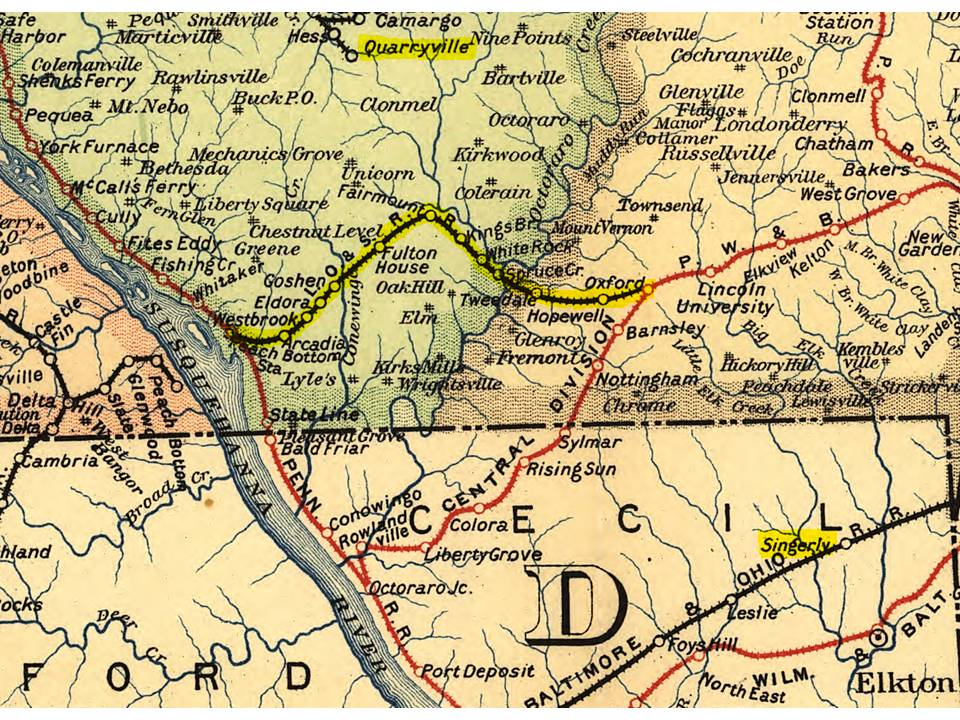
- LO&S Railroad map from 1895. Two planned destinations are also highlighted: Quarryville, PA and Singerly, MD

Overview
- Headquarters: Oxford, Pennsylvania
- Locale: Southeastern Pennsylvania
- Dates of operation: 1912–1918
- Predecessor: Lancaster, Oxford and Southern Railroad
- Successor: None

Technical
- Track gauge: 3 ft (914 mm)
- Length: 28 mi (45 km)

The Lancaster, Oxford and Southern Railway (LO&S) was a 3 ft (914 mm) narrow gauge railway that operated in southeastern Pennsylvania between 1912 and 1918, as a successor company following the bankruptcy of the Lancaster, Oxford and Southern Railroad. The main line connected Oxford and Peach Bottom, Pennsylvania.

== History ==
The original line was built between 1872 and 1878 as the Eastern Division of the Peach Bottom Railway. The line began in Oxford, connecting with the Philadelphia and Baltimore Central Railroad, and proceeded roughly westward to Fairmont, then southwest to Peach Bottom, on the eastern shore of the Susquehanna River. The line served passengers and freight from farm communities, but there were no industries on the line, and it was not successful financially. It originally used type 2-4-0 steam locomotives.

In 1881 the Peach Bottom Railway declared bankruptcy and was reorganized as the Peach Bottom Railroad. In 1890 the company went bankrupt again and it was sold to investors who reorganized as the 3 ft (914 mm) narrow gauge Lancaster, Oxford and Southern Railroad. These investors hoped to connect Lancaster County to the Baltimore and Ohio Railroad (B&O) by building a branch line from Fairmont, on the existing LO&S line, to Quarryville, as well as an extension from Oxford southeast to Singerly, Maryland (north of Elkton) on the B&O main line. To this end they planned to convert the existing tracks to standard gauge. By 1905 the railroad had six locomotives—the newer models were type 4-4-0—and 24 freight cars.

The LO&S owners did not have sufficient finances to build the B&O connection, nor to convert to standard gauge. In 1906 they opened a branch line from Fairmont to Quarryville.

== Decline and liquidation ==
The company continued to struggle financially and in 1911 it entered receivership. New owners took control in 1912 of the reorganized Lancaster, Oxford and Southern Railway, but they were no more successful in reviving the company, and by 1914 the LO&S discontinued all trains, except for a small mail operation using a speeder. In October 1914 the railroad was sold again, and an attempt was made to operate more economically by converting some passenger cars to gasoline-powered railcars (sometimes called "doodlebugs"). Competition for freight traffic from trucks, as well as the high prices being offered for scrap metal during World War I, led the management to permanently close the railroad in 1918. One doodlebug car, #10, was sold to the Strasburg Railroad, where it continues to operate in passenger service.

== See also ==
- List of defunct Pennsylvania railroads
