= Delta, Pennsylvania =

Borough in Pennsylvania, US

- Borough
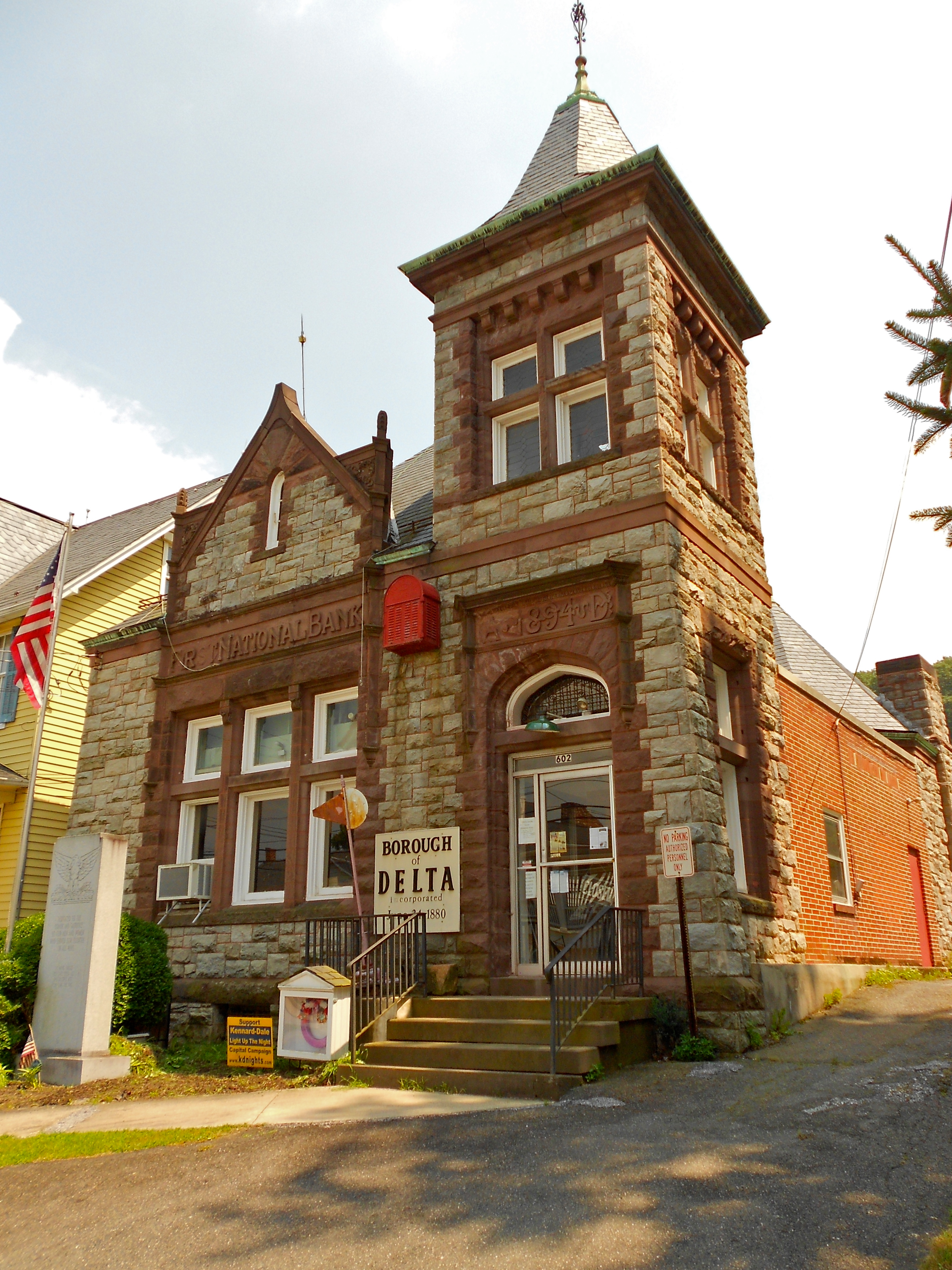
- Borough Hall in Delta

- Location of York County, Pennsylvania in Pennsylvania (top) and of Delta in York County (bottom)

- Location of Delta in Pennsylvania Delta (the United States)
- Coordinates: 39°43′38″N 76°19′32″W
- Country: United States
- State: Pennsylvania
- County: York
- Settled: 1744
- Incorporated: 1853

Government
  - Type: Borough Council
  - Mayor: Joan Jones

Area
  - Total: 0.26 sq mi (0.68 km^{2})
  - Land: 0.26 sq mi (0.68 km^{2})
  - Water: 0 sq mi (0.00 km^{2})
- Elevation: 627 ft (191 m)

Population (2020)
  - Total: 705
  - Density: 2,699.4/sq mi (1,042.24/km^{2})
- Time zone: UTC-5 (Eastern (EST))
  - Summer (DST): UTC-4 (EDT)
- Zip Code: 17314
- Area code: 717
- FIPS code: 42-18800
- Website: Delta, Pennsylvania

Delta is a borough in York County, Pennsylvania, United States, and one of the southernmost communities in Pennsylvania. The population was 705 at the 2020 census. It is part of the York–Hanover metropolitan area. It is served by the South Eastern School District which provides a public education.

== Geography ==
Video of Delta's historic district from north to south

Delta is located at 39°43′38″N 76°19′32″W (39.727207, -76.325668).

According to the U.S. Census Bureau, the borough has a total area of 0.3 square miles (0.78 km^{2}), all land.

== Demographics ==
As of the 2000 census, there were 741 people, 285 households, and 194 families residing in the borough. The population density was 2,783.3 inhabitants per square mile (1,074.6/km^{2}). There were 324 housing units at an average density of 1,217.0 per square mile (469.9/km^{2}). The racial makeup of the borough was 97.84% White, 0.94% African American, 0.27% Native American, 0.13% Asian, and 0.81% from two or more races. Hispanic or Latino of any race were 0.13% of the population.

There were 285 households, out of which 37.5% had children under the age of 18 living with them, 50.5% were married couples living together, 10.5% had a female householder with no husband present, and 31.9% were non-families. 25.6% of all households were made up of individuals, and 10.9% had someone living alone who was 65 years of age or older. The average household size was 2.60 and the average family size was 3.12.

Historical population
Census	Pop.	Note	%±
1880	269		—
1890	565		110.0%
1900	684		21.1%
1910	881		28.8%
1920	858		−2.6%
1930	762		−11.2%
1940	724		−5.0%
1950	840		16.0%
1960	822		−2.1%
1970	778		−5.4%
1980	692		−11.1%
1990	761		10.0%
2000	741		−2.6%
2010	728		−1.8%
2020	707		−2.9%
2023 (est.)	705	▼	−0.3%

In the borough, the population was spread out, with 29.4% under the age of 18, 8.1% from 18 to 24, 31.7% from 25 to 44, 19.8% from 45 to 64, and 10.9% who were 65 years of age or older. The median age was 34 years. For every 100 females there were 96.6 males. For every 100 females age 18 and over, there were 98.9 males.

The median income for a household in the borough was $39,732, and the median income for a family was $45,000. Males had a median income of $35,735 versus $25,417 for females. The per capita income for the borough was $17,677. About 9.6% of families and 9.2% of the population were below the poverty line, including 8.8% of those under age 18 and 8.3% of those age 65 or over. Currently there is a development which will greatly increase the population.

== History and landmarks ==
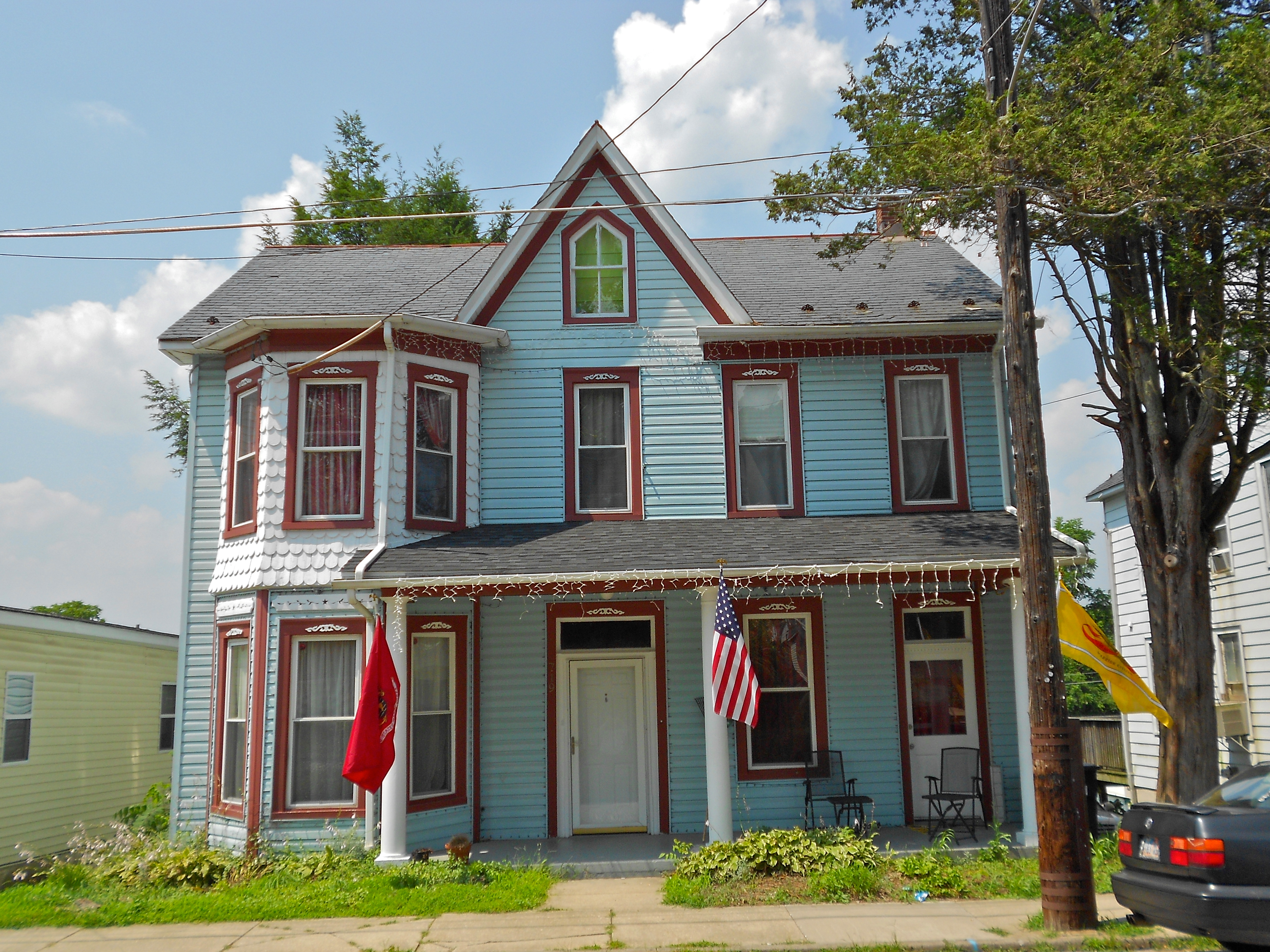
A house on Main Street in Delta

Delta was named by George L Ziegler. It is at the heart of the Peach Bottom Slate Region. Slate quarries opened in Delta in the 1840s, when quarrymen arrived from Wales. At the Crystal Palace Exposition of 1850, Peach Bottom slate was judged the finest in the world. Most of Delta's houses still have slate roofs, and remnants of the original blue-black slate sidewalks still exist throughout the borough.

The Peach Bottom Railway entered Delta in 1876, and shipped slate along its line to Red Lion and York, Pennsylvania. From the south, the Maryland Central Railroad reached Delta in 1883 and began operating trains from Delta to Bel Air, Maryland and Baltimore in 1884. Both lines were later succeeded by the Maryland and Pennsylvania Railroad, which operated until 1978. The slate quarry was a major freight customer until 1971, when Delta’s Funkhouser Quarry closed.

The Rehoboth Welsh Chapel in Delta is a non-denominational Christian church that holds services in Welsh and English. Its Welsh choir has won a prize at the highly competitive National Eisteddfod of Wales and performed at the wedding of Michael Douglas and Catherine Zeta Jones.

The Delta Historic District was listed on the National Register of Historic Places in 1983.

== Notable people ==
- James Alexander, Jr., (1789–1846), former U.S. Representative
- Thomas Dale Stewart, (1901–1997), forensic anthropologist, Smithsonian Institution
