= Hanover Subdivision =

Railway line in Maryland and Pennsylvania

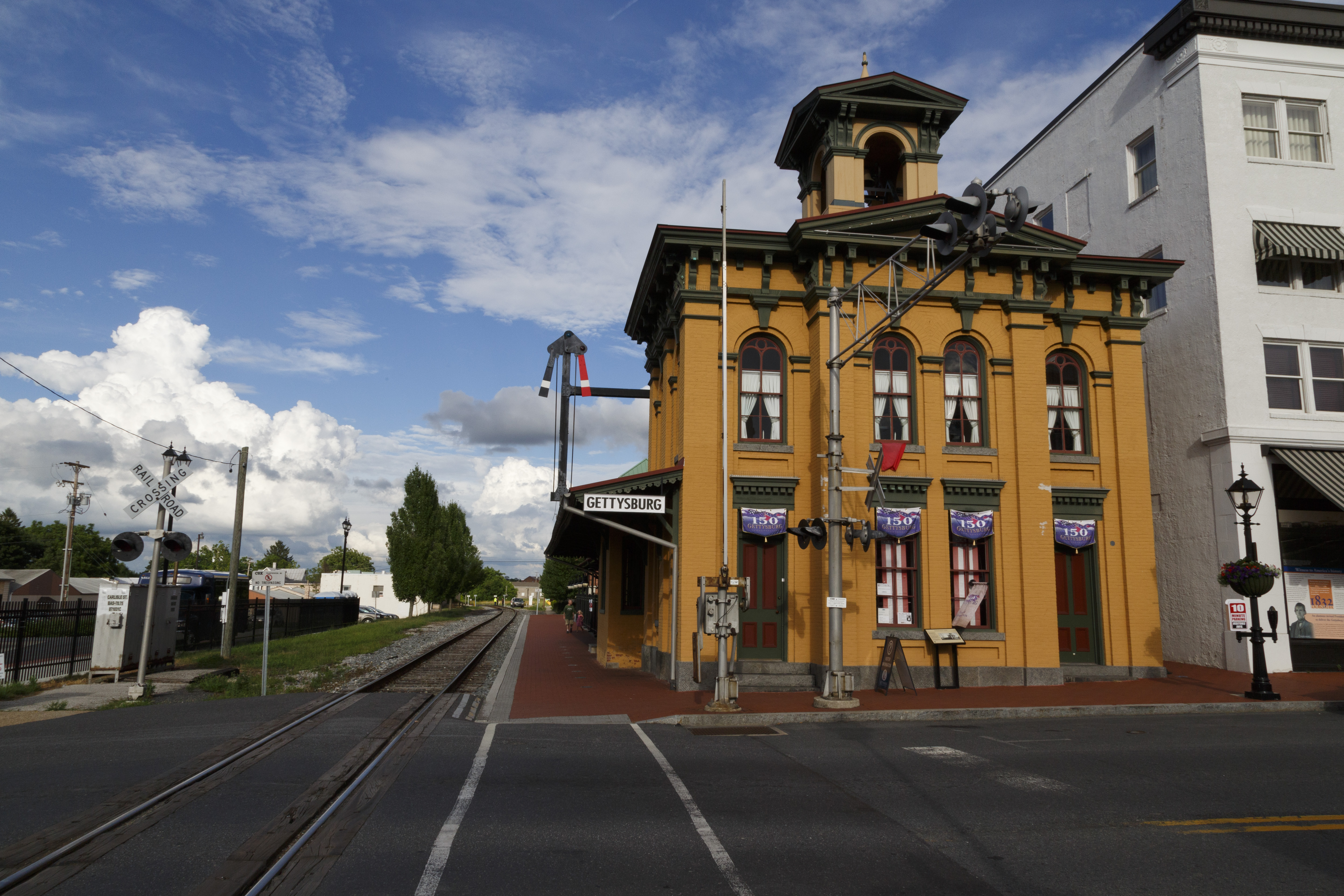
The former Gettysburg Western Maryland Railroad station, which served the Hanover Subdivision.

The Hanover Subdivision is a railroad line owned and operated by CSX Transportation in the U.S. states of Maryland and Pennsylvania. The line runs from Baltimore, Maryland, west to Hagerstown, Maryland, along several former Western Maryland Railway (WM) lines. It meets the Baltimore Terminal Subdivision at its east end, and the Lurgan Subdivision heads both north and west from its west end.

== History ==
=== Initial sections ===
The first section of the Hanover Branch was built between Porters, Pennsylvania, and Hanover, Pennsylvania, opened in 1852 as part of the Hanover Branch Railroad. The Gettysburg Railroad opened a section between Hanover and Gettysburg, Pennsylvania, in 1858.

The WM initially built from the end of the Northern Central Railway's Green Spring Branch at Owings Mills, Maryland, to Hagerstown. Construction began in 1857. The line reached Westminster in 1861 and Hagerstown in 1872. In 1873 the WM built its own line from Owings Mills to Fulton Junction in Baltimore. The WM designated the Baltimore-Hagerstown line as its East Subdivision.

=== Connections and acquisitions ===
The Bachman Valley Railroad built a line from Valley Junction (1.25 mi east of Porters) south to the Maryland state line in 1872, and the Baltimore and Hanover Railroad continued the line south to Emory Grove, MD, connecting with the WM in 1879. In 1886 the WM acquired control of the line from Emory Grove to Hanover. It also took control of the Gettysburg Railroad. The Hanover Junction, Hanover and Gettysburg Railroad had extended the line from Gettysburg west to Orrtanna, Pennsylvania, in 1885, and the Baltimore and Harrisburg Railway opened the rest of the line from Orrtanna west to Highfield in 1889, where it connected with the existing East Subdivision. The Emory Grove-Gettysburg-Highfield route became the WM's Hanover Subdivision. In addition to servicing industries and cities in Pennsylvania, the Hanover Sub provided an alternate route between Baltimore and Hagerstown, although it was 23 miles (37 km) longer than the East Sub.

The WM built a marine terminal at Port Covington in Baltimore in 1904, and built a new connecting line from the East Sub to the terminal. The 5.3 mile (8.5 km) line ran from Walbrook Junction, west of Fulton, to Port Covington, and was designed as the WM's Tide Subdivision.

=== Consolidation ===
In 1968 the Chesapeake and Ohio Railway (C&O) and the Baltimore and Ohio Railroad (B&O) received government approval to jointly control the Western Maryland Railway. In 1973, as part of the Chessie System, Western Maryland ownership went to C&O and it was operated by the B&O. The B&O itself merged with the C&O in 1987, which itself became part of CSX Transportation in that year.

Port Covington declined in the 1970s as traffic was shifted to nearby Chessie (formerly B&O) facilities, and the terminal was completely closed by 1988. CSX consolidated operations across the old WM subdivisions. The present CSX Hanover Subdivision consists of the old WM Hanover Sub (Highfield-Emory Grove), and portions of the East Sub (Hagerstown-Highfield and Emory Grove-Walbrook) and Tide Sub (Walbrook-Mt. Winans Yard in Baltimore). (CSX sold the remainder of the East Sub, from Emory Grove to Highfield, to the Maryland Midland Railway in the 1980s.)

== See also ==
- List of CSX Transportation lines
