= Granite station =

Former Gettysburg Railroad train station

Granite

General information
- Location: Granite Station Road near U.S. 30; Adams County, Pennsylvania; United States
- Coordinates: 39.8554°N 77.1590°W

History
- Closed: c. 1900-1910

Former services
Preceding station	Western Maryland Railway	Following station
Gettysburg toward Highfield	Baltimore – Hanover – Gettysburg Line	Gulden's toward Glyndon
Location

Granite station was the first Gettysburg Railroad train station east of Gettysburg, Pennsylvania, until an American Civil War station for Camp Letterman was built near the Hunterstown Road for supplying the hospital for Battle of Gettysburg wounded. Gulden's Station was to the west near Low Dutch Road, and 600 Confederates were posted at Granite Station during Early's raids in Pennsylvania just prior to the Battle of Gettysburg. The station was at the subsequent spur for the 1893 Granite Hill Railroad on a 0.5 mi (0.80 km) serpentine path around Granite Hill to a quarry. The station included an 1867 grain and hay business of Philip Hann & Sons, the Eckenrode warehouse sold in 1870, and the 1909 John Stallsmith warehouse.
