= McPherson Ridge railway cut =

Entrenchment of Gettysburg Battlefield, US

The railway cut of the Gettysburg Battlefield was the place of an 1863 military engagement during the first Day of the Battle of Gettysburg, near the Edward McPherson farmhouse. It was an excavation in which railroad tracks had not yet been placed, but which provided a deep entrenchment. During the day, units from the Union Army of the Potomac deployed near the railway cut to contest the attacks of the Confederate Army of Northern Virginia. The Confederates were held off during the morning and early afternoon but were able to drive off the Union army due to superior numbers.

== Background ==
The line of the Hanover Branch Railroad which ran from Hanover to Gettysburg ended in the northern part of Gettysburg; an additional spur was planned to run westward from the town but at the time of the battle the proposed line was only laid out and graded. The unfinished portion cut through several ridges west of Gettysburg, the first cut running through Seminary Ridge, near the southern end of Oak Ridge, and another through McPherson's Ridge. The Chambersburg Pike ran parallel to the unfinished rail line.

== During the battle ==
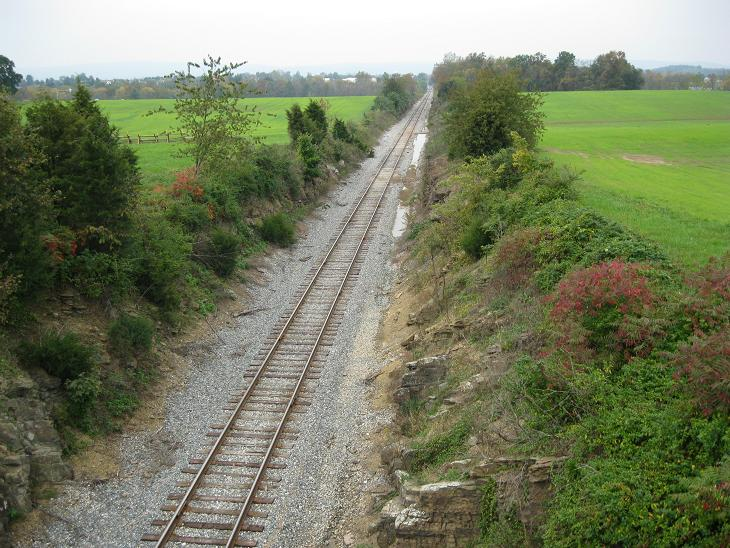
Railroad cut looking NW toward the Catoctins

At approximately 10 a.m. on July 1, the brigade of Lysander Cutler, from the I Corps division of James S. Wadsworth, deployed near the cut on McPherson's Ridge with the 76th New York and 147th New York and 56th Pennsylvania Infantry Regiments deployed north of the cut and the 84th New York (14th Brooklyn) and 95th New York Infantry Regiments south of the Chambersburg Pike. The 2nd Maine Battery deployed between the railroad cut and the pike. Minutes later the right wing of the brigade was attacked by the Confederate brigade of Joseph R. Davis with three regiments. The Confederates had a numerical advantage over the three Union regiments and consequently were able to overlap the Union right flank. The pressure on the Union regiments forced Wadsworth to order the regiments to withdraw. The 76th New York and 56th Pennsylvania managed to retreat, which allowed the Confederates to enfilade the 2nd Maine battery, forcing it to retreat as well; the 147th New York failed to receive the order and remained on the northern side of the railroad cut, suffering severe casualties as a result. The regiment retreated only after Wadsworth sent another courier through the Confederate fire.

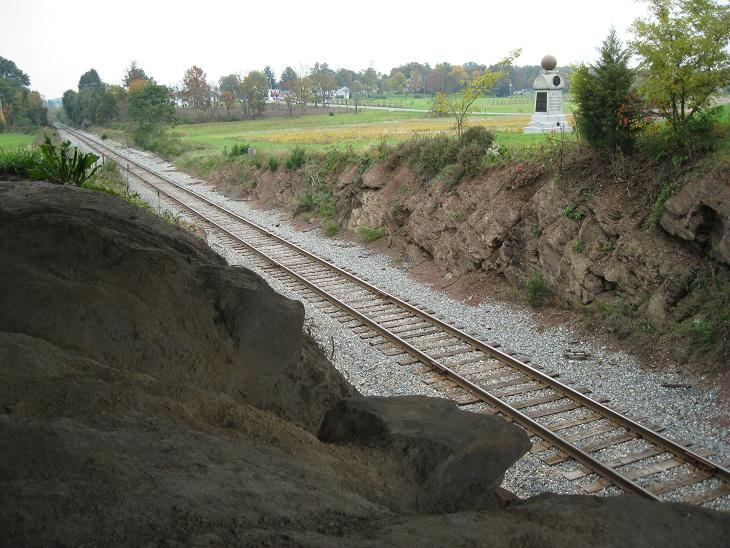
Railroad cut looking SE toward Gettysburg

Following the Union retreat, Davis' three regiments moved to the railroad cut and faced south, with half of the brigade jumping into the cut to use it as a trench and the other half halting on the northern edge. Meanwhile, Wadsworth and the acting Union corps commander Abner Doubleday organized a force to recapture the railroad cut, using Cutler's other two regiments and the 6th Wisconsin Volunteer Infantry Regiment of the Iron Brigade. The three regiments formed south of the Chambersburg Pike and advanced north, suffering 300 to 330 casualties. As the Union force closed in on Davis' brigade, part of the 6th Wisconsin moved across the eastern end of the railroad bed to the northern edge of the cut and enfiladed the Confederate positions. About three hundred Confederates surrendered, while the remainder of the brigade retreated out of the western of the cut.

After the defeat of Davis' brigade, Cutler's brigade redeployed on the northern side of the railroad cut before being moved north to support the Union artillery near Oak Hill and to counter the arrival of Robert E. Rodes' division from the north. The brigade of Roy Stone was deployed south of the Chambersburg Pike, near the cut, and faced west. When Junius Daniel's brigade of Rodes' division began moving south from Oak Hill towards his position, Stone shifted two of his regiments so they faced north along the Chambersburg Pike. Some of Daniel's men jumped into the cut but were unable to scale the south bank to fire upon Stone's brigade; when a Union battery started firing from their left, they retreated. The fire of Stone's brigade was sufficient to repulse Daniel's attack but Stone and the commanders of both regiments were all wounded. At about 4 p.m., Dorsey Pender's and Henry Heth's divisions launched an attack on McPherson's Ridge and Seminary Ridge, gradually pushing Stone's brigade back.

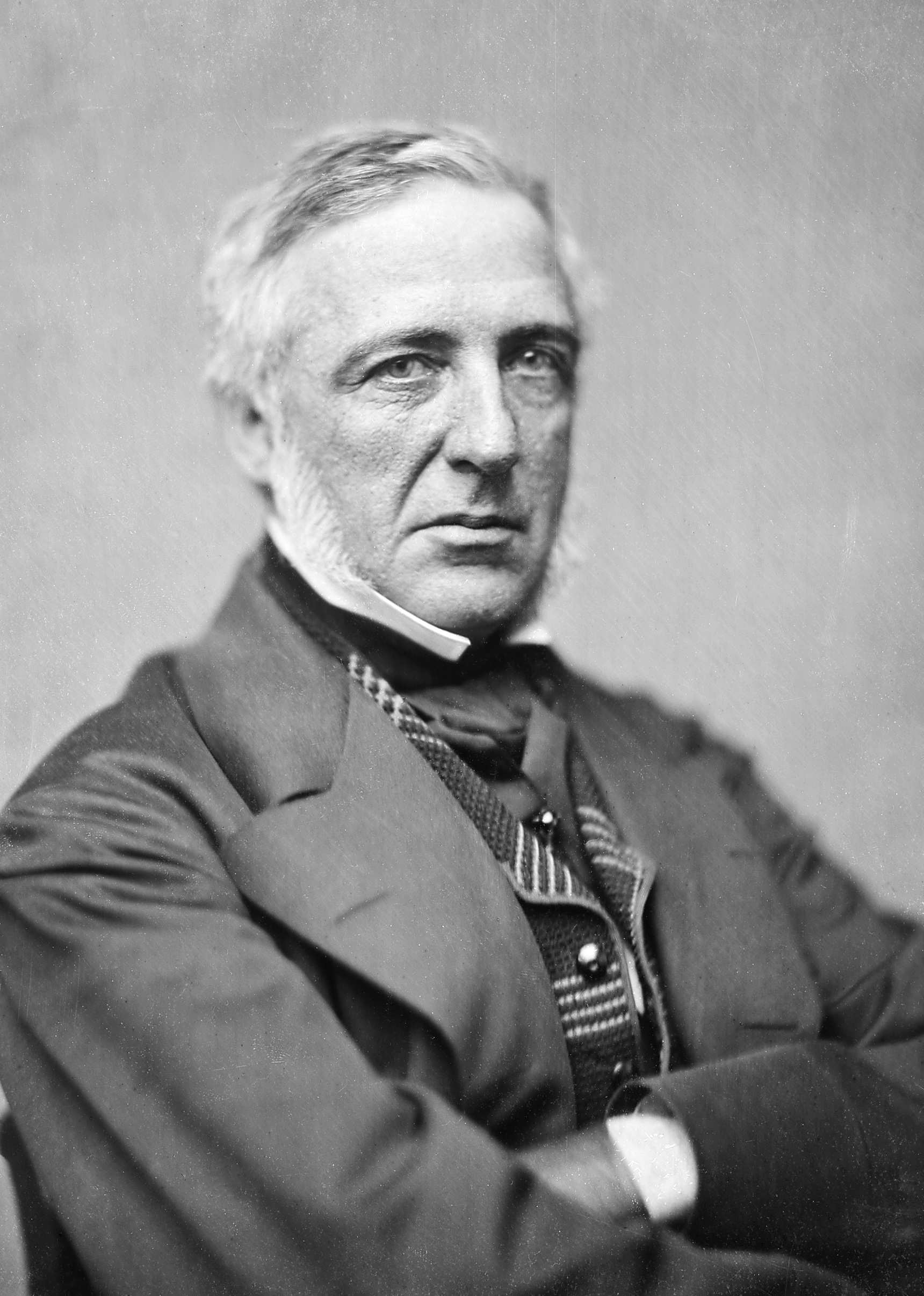
James S. Wadsworth

Chronology
Date	Topic	Event
1835	Hanover Branch Railroad	The railway cut was excavated for a planned railroad, as was a cut through the "Railroad Woods" at Seminary Ridge.
July 1, 1863		Three regiments of Joseph R. Davis's brigade used the railroad cut as a trench; a counterattack by Union forces captured over two hundred and forced the rest of the brigade to retreat back to the west. Corporal Francis A. Wallar was awarded an 1864 Medal of Honor for action near the railway cut for capturing the 2d Mississippi Infantry flag.
5 pm July 1, 1863		Wiedrich's Union artillery brigade at Cemetery Hill fired on Confederates at the railway cut.
1884-05	Baltimore and Harrisburg Railway	The railroad from Gettysburg was extended west to Marsh Creek (Seven Stars) and in 1885, 7 mi (11 km) from Gettysburg "giving rise to the village of Wortzville-Orrtanna".
1958	Mission 66	The battlefield avenue bridge over the railway cut was replaced for the 1966 National Park Service's 50th anniversary.
1990		The National Park Service traded the eastern railroad cut to Gettysburg College for a scenic easement over the college property.
1996		During a hard rainstorm, the bones of a soldier were washed out; his identity could not be determined and he was reburied in the Soldiers' National Cemetery.

External images
- Gettysburg railway cut image with tracks
- 11:15 A.M. map of attacks on railway cut
- Color image of cut from 95th NY Infantry monument

== Sources ==
- Bennett, Gerald The Gettysburg Railroad Station: A Brief History. Gettysburg Railroad Station Restoration Project, 2006.
- Martin, David G. Gettysburg July 1. Conshohocken, Pennsylvania: Combined Books, Inc., 1996. ISBN 0-938289-81-0.
- Petruzzi, J. David. The Complete Gettysburg Guide: Walking and Driving Tours of the Battlefield, Town, Cemeteries, Field Hospital Sites, and other Topics of Historical Interest. New York: Savas Beatie, 2009. ISBN 978-1-932714-63-0.
- Shue, Richard S. Morning at Willoughby Run: The Opening Battle at Gettysburg July 1, 1863. Gettysburg, Pennsylvania: Thomas Publications, 1998. ISBN 0-939631-79-2.
- Trudeau, Noah Andre. Gettysburg: A Testing of Courage. New York: Perennial, 2002. ISBN 0-06-093186-8
