= Susquehanna, Gettysburg and Potomac Railway =

19th century Pennsylvanian railroad

Overview
- Locale: Pennsylvania
- Dates of operation: 1870–1874
- Successor: Hanover Junction, Hanover and Gettysburg Railroad

Technical
- Track gauge: 4 ft 8 1/2 in (1,435 mm)

The Susquehanna, Gettysburg and Potomac Railway (SG&P) was a railroad that operated in Pennsylvania in the 1870s. The 17 mile (27 km) main line ran from Gettysburg to Hanover.

The SG&P was formed in 1870 to purchase the assets of the Gettysburg Railroad. The railroad owned two steam locomotives, one passenger car and two freight cars. The line connected at Hanover to the Hanover Branch Railroad, which ran eastward to Hanover Junction, where it connected with the Northern Central Railway. Operations were handled by the Hanover Branch RR.

In 1874 the SG&P merged with Hanover Branch to form the Hanover Junction, Hanover and Gettysburg Railroad. The new company extended the line west to Marsh Creek in 1884 and to Orrtanna in 1885. In 1886 the company merged with the Baltimore and Hanover Railroad to form the Baltimore and Harrisburg Railway. This company was controlled by the Western Maryland Railway, and the WM bought the company in 1917.

== See also ==
- List of defunct Pennsylvania railroads
