= Gettysburg station =

Historic train station in Gettysburg, Pennsylvania

Gettysburg Lincoln Railroad Station
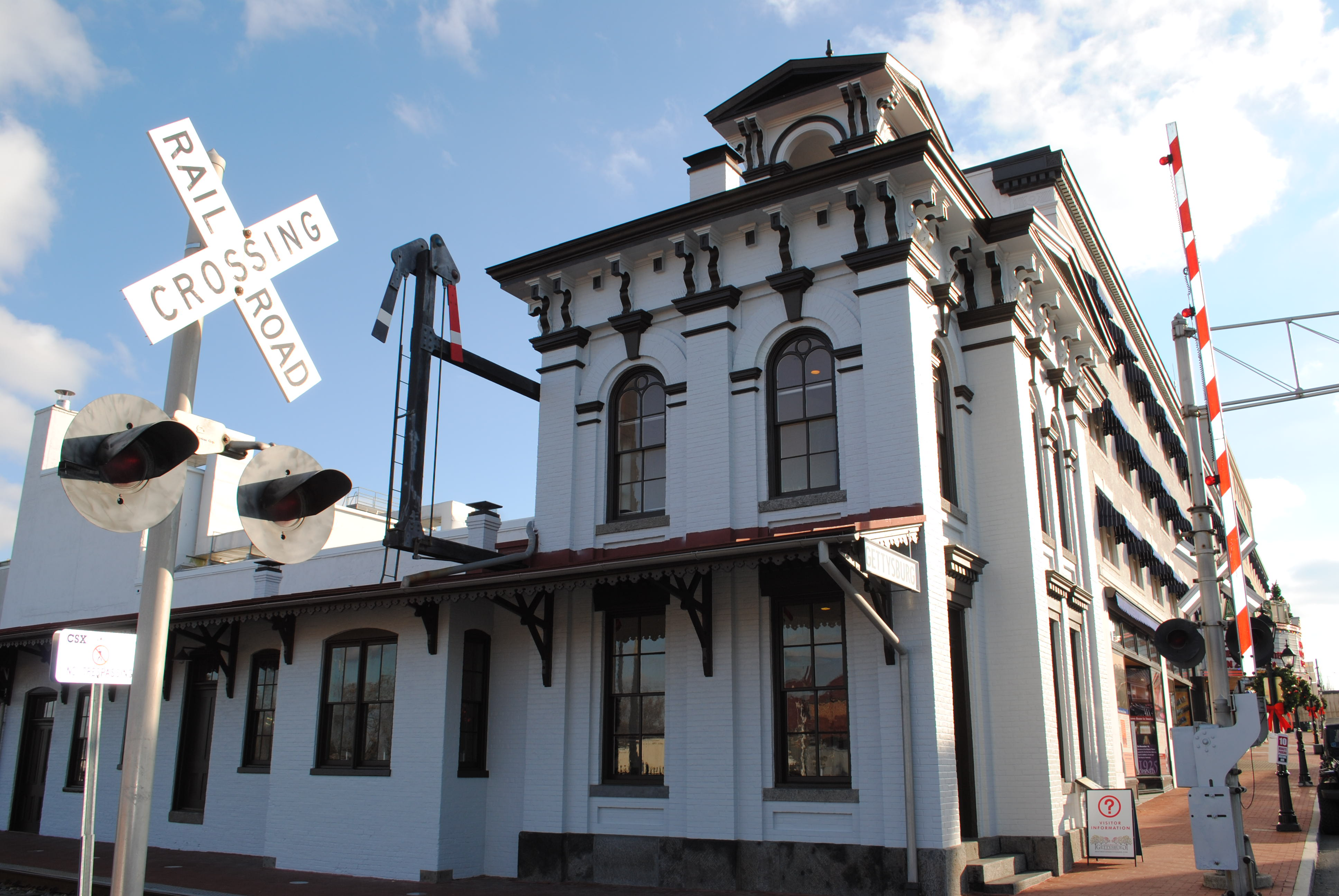
- The c. 1858 Italianate depot with arched windows, cornice moldings, and a low-pitched roof with eaves (the 1-story addition was in 1886,).

General information
- Other names: Gettysburg Train Station; Lincoln Train Station; Western Maryland Railroad Station
- Location: 35 Carlisle Street; Gettysburg, PA; United States
- Coordinates: 39°49′55.232″N 77°13′51.46″W
- Owner: Gettysburg National Military Park
- Operator: Gettysburg Foundation
- Lines: Western Maryland Railway (defunct); CSX Transportation (freight line - does not stop at station)
- Platforms: 1
- Tracks: 1

Construction
- Structure type: At-grade
- Cycle facilities: Yes
- Accessible: Yes

History
- Opened: May 1858
- Closed: December 31, 1942

Key dates
- 1863-1865: Service is interrupted at the station as the Confederate Army made its way north and engages the Union Army during the Gettysburg campaign. Service is only restored following repairs to the rail lines and bridges.

Former services
Preceding station	Western Maryland Railway	Following station
Seven Stars toward Highfield	Baltimore – Hanover – Gettysburg Line	Granite toward Glyndon
- Gettysburg Train Station
- U.S. Historic district – Contributing property
- Location: Gettysburg, Pennsylvania
- Built: c.1858
- Restored: 2009
- Restored by: Gettysburg Foundation
- Part of: Gettysburg Battlefield Historic District (ID75000155)
- MPS: Battle of Gettysburg MPS
- Designated CP: March 19, 1975
Location

The Gettysburg Lincoln Railroad Station, also known as the "Gettysburg Train Station," "Lincoln Train Station" or "Western Maryland Railroad Station," is a historic train station with depot, platform, museum and offices on Carlisle Street in Gettysburg, Pennsylvania, United States. Operable from 1858 to 1942, it contributes to the Gettysburg Battlefield Historic District and is most notable as President Abraham Lincoln's point of arrival on November 18, 1863 and departure, following delivery of the Gettysburg Address. The station served as both a hospital during the battle and hub for outgoing wounded soldiers and incoming resources and supplies following the end of the war. On 2015, following several years of delays, the station, which was originally owned by the Borough of Gettysburg but was bought by the Gettysburg Foundation, the non-profit partner to the National Park Service, was placed under the purview of the National Park Service.

== History ==
After an uncompleted 1830s plan for a railroad through Gettysburg, on December 1, 1858, the Gettysburg Railroad line was completed from the east to Gettysburg with a reception for railroad dignitaries held several days later at "a large and recently furnished building near the depot" (the depot was being built on 0.4 acres (0.16 ha) purchased from George W McClellan in the summer). The Gettysburg Railroad Company had contracted for Passenger Depot construction on September 18, 1858 for "the Corner of Carlisle and Railroad street"; and on January 10, 1859, the stockholders resolved to hold their future meetings "in the office [of] their Passenger Depot".

Depot configuration and reversing the train

The completed depot had two 1st floor waiting rooms (for men and for women & children) and, via a spiral staircase on the eastern side, a large open room on the 2nd floor. The ticket booth/office was a small structure attached to the southeast part of the station. After an 1886 expansion, the original 2-room headhouse became the men's waiting room and was separated from the women's room in the new space by a long hallway.

Until the tracks were extended west of Gettysburg, trains reversed near the station to return eastward:

1. Arriving westbound on the main line, an engine with passenger car switched onto a siding and stopped along a long loading platform behind the depot where passengers detrained.
2. The engine backed the car from the 1st siding onto a 2nd siding where the car was disconnected.
3. The engine then switched back onto the main line (the engine was reversed).
4. The passenger car was rolled back onto the 1st siding along the platform for loading.
5. The engine backed onto the 1st siding, connected to the loaded car's opposite end, and headed east.

== American Civil War ==
Train service to the depot was stopped when Jubal Early's Confederates burned the Rock Creek trestle on June 27, 1863. The station was undamaged during the battle and returned to service in 1865 following the end of evacuation of the wounded or dead and repairs to the lines.

The station was used as a hospital, and soldiers used the station's cupola during the battle. A station east of the borough was established for Camp Letterman before rail traffic was restored to the depot on July 10, and by the end of July, nearly 15,000 wounded troops had passed through the station via the twice-daily trains. A medical inspector of the Army arrived on July 8 and used the depot while "in immediate charge of the transportation of the wounded".

=== Heroine of the station ===
As the Confederate forces approached the town the depot's telegrapher, the adopted young daughter of a "Mr. (Brown) Lee in Washington county, [sic] Pa.", evacuated the station at the beginning of the battle and "took the machine from the operating table [and] connected the wires so as to preserve the circuit intact and carried the instrument to Cemetery Hill" where, after instructing soldiers how to connect to the wires (e.g., along the Baltimore Pike), she used the key to relay Union Army information. The girl remained during the duration of the battle, even when the soldiers around her were felled by bullets and shells. After the battle, she packed up the machine and returned to the station to resume her work. Her name was unknown during and after the battle and a news article 30 years later attempted to identify the young girl.

== Gettysburg Address ==
For the consecration of the National Cemetery at Gettysburg on November 19, 1863, President Abraham Lincoln arrived at 6:00 p.m. on the 18th and departed 24 hours later, having delivered the Gettysburg Address.

== Postbellum ==
(L. D. Plank replaced Charles T. Rose as the 1902 Western Union Telegraph operator in the "W. U. office") and the station's railroad line became part of the successor lines: Susquehanna, Gettysburg and Potomac Railway (1870), Hanover Junction, Hanover and Gettysburg Railroad (1874), Baltimore and Harrisburg Railway (1885), and Western Maryland Railway (1917). The last passenger train departed the depot at 4:00 p.m. on December 31, 1942, when the depot's passenger service was discontinued. (scheduled Reading passenger service had ended in 1941). The depot was used until 1948 for administration of freight trains and telegraphy. On April 1, 1955, Western Maryland leased the building to the Gettysburg Travel Council (CSX Transportation owned the station in 1987).

=== Renovation ===
Following a 1996 meeting regarding the station's condition (the station was near collapse), renovation was funded. The Borough of Gettysburg acquired the property on May 6, 1998; the Gettysburg Convention and Visitors' Bureau vacated the depot in 2002; and renovation began in January 2005 (completed 2006). The Pennsylvania Abraham Lincoln Bicentennial Commission was "pivotal in the grand re-opening of the Historic Gettysburg Train Station" on the 2006 anniversary of Lincoln's arrival. The borough approved a 2007 2nd floor lease for the Gettysburg International Arts Festival, and the station has been operated by the National Trust for Historic Gettysburg since 2008. In 2010, H.R. 4395 by Todd Platts failed in the US Senate for allowing Gettysburg National Military Park acquisition of the depot.

== Gettysburg railroad museum ==
The depot's first floor is a museum with an information counter and is open daily (free) to the public. The museum contains models, diagrams, exhibits, and artifacts which were found during the renovation of the station.
