= York Railway =

American railroad

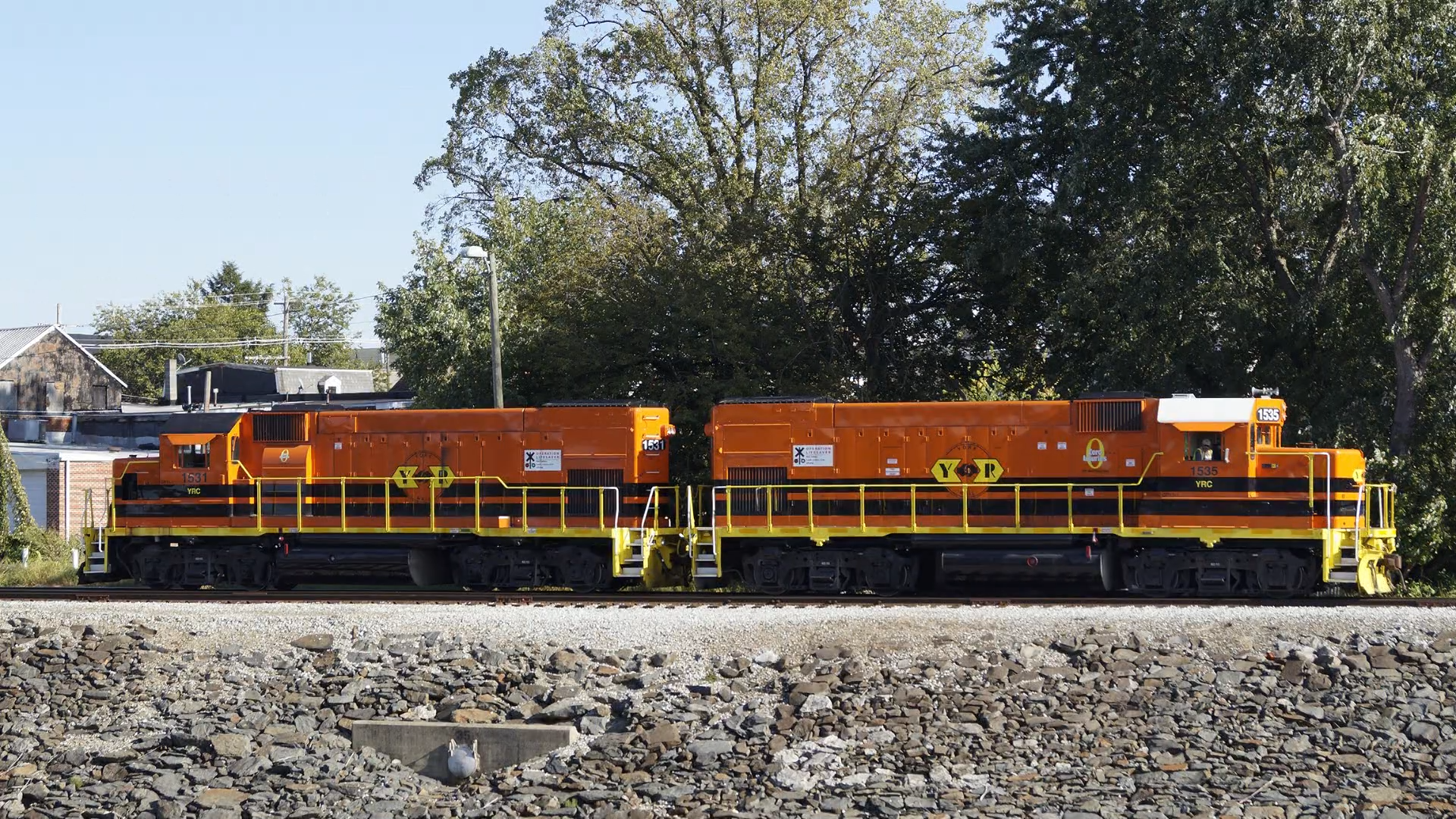
- York Railway GP15-1 locomotives #1531 and #1535 in 2020.

Overview
- Headquarters: York, Pennsylvania
- Reporting mark: YRC
- Locale: Southeastern Pennsylvania
- Dates of operation: 1999–present

Technical
- Track gauge: 4 ft 8 1/2 in (1,435 mm) standard gauge

The York Railway (reporting mark YRC) is a shortline railroad operating 48 miles (77 km) of track in and near York, Pennsylvania. YRC was acquired by Genesee & Wyoming in 2002, has a capacity of 286,000, and has three interchanges: CSX (Porters, Pennsylvania and Hanover, Pennsylvania); East Penn Railroad (York, Pennsylvania); Norfolk Southern (York, Pennsylvania).

== History and notable features ==
The company was created in 1999 through a consolidation of Yorkrail, Inc. (reporting mark YKR) and the Maryland and Pennsylvania Railroad (M&P), both owned by the Emons Railroad Group, and it immediately sold the property thus acquired to limited liability lessor subsidiaries with the same names (Yorkrail, LLC and Maryland and Pennsylvania Railroad Company, LLC). Genesee & Wyoming Inc. gained control of the company, and the other Emons properties, in 2002.

The York Railway operates two parallel main lines, extending southwest from York to CSX Transportation interchanges. Most of the M&P's original line from York to Baltimore has been abandoned, but a short piece in York is still operated.

The M&P's current main line is an ex-Pennsylvania Railroad line that it acquired from the Penn Central Transportation Company in 1976, beginning at a connection with the Norfolk Southern Railway in York and running to a CSX connection at Hanover. The Yorkrail line, running from a junction with the M&P in York to a CSX connection at Porters Sideling, PA, was opened in 1893 by the Baltimore and Harrisburg Railway (Eastern Extension), a predecessor of the Western Maryland Railway, and sold by CSX Transportation to Yorkrail in 1989.

The York Railway owns three ex-Santa Fe CF7 diesels: #1500 (the last such locomotive built), 1502 and 1504 that were usually operated as a pair, and alternated to equalize operating hours.

The railroad also operates ex-CSX EMD GP16 diesels #1600, 1602, 1604 and 1606 as well as a pair of LTEX GP15-1s numbered 1414 and 1444. The 1502 and 1504 were parked for several years in a deadline between Hokes Mill Road (Route 182) and South Sumner Street in York, Pennsylvania, along with GP9 1754. In early February 2018, the railway removed a traction motor from No. 1504 and put it in No. 1606. On January 30, 2021, scrapping began on No.s 1502, 1504 and 1754, the three inoperative locomotives.
