= Early's raids in Pennsylvania =

1863 action of the American Civil War

Early's raids in Pennsylvania were a series of June military actions before the 1863 Battle of Gettysburg in which the Confederate forces of Major General Jubal Early conducted raids and military engagements from Chambersburg through Gettysburg to York.

Chronology
Date	Event
23	Jenkins' Confederate cavalry, from the "Hughes iron works," raided "Stevens' Furnace" and took $5,000 in mules/horses. The destroyed facility was rebuilt for $80,000 (c. 1890 the "big house" burned).
25	Early's headquarters was at Greenwood on the turnpike near the summit of South Mountain.
26	Early demanded a $10,000 ransom (plus supplies) from Gettysburg, and his forces engaged local militia along the Baltimore Pike; killing G. W. Sandoe at a site later on the Gettysburg Battlefield.
27	On the east border of the borough of Gettysburg, Early's forces burned the Gettysburg Railroad trestle over Rock Creek and pushed burning railroad cars into the fire (17 burnt). Following the railroad eastward, White's Confederate cavalry raided Hanover, including the telegraph lines and the Hanover Junction Railroad Station.
28	Hunter's Union cavalry captured 13 of 18 in a Confederate squad that had taken horses from a Fairfield church service.
	Early demanded a $100,000 ransom (plus supplies) from York but didn't burn the community.
30	Early returned through East Berlin and camped at Heidlersburg returning from York en route to Cashtown and on July 1, learned of the Battle of Gettysburg when he was ordered to approach on the Harrisburg Road.
