= Gettysburg Railroad =

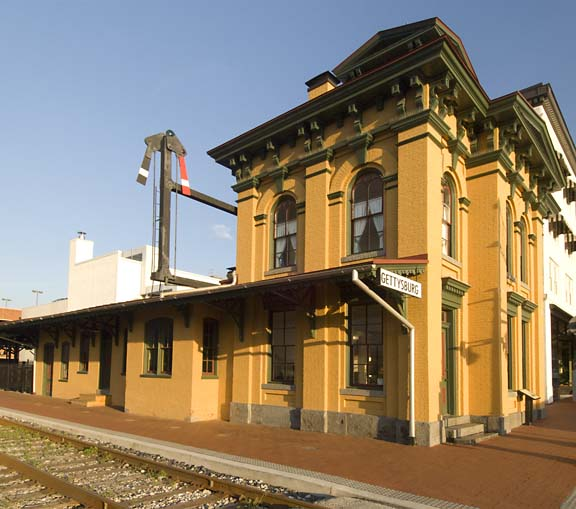
- The Gettysburg Railroad Station was used as a hospital during the Battle of Gettysburg

Overview
- Locale: Pennsylvania
- Dates of operation: 1851–1871
- Successor: Susquehanna, Gettysburg and Potomac Railway

Technical
- Track gauge: 4 ft 8 1/2 in (1,435 mm)

The Gettysburg Railroad was a railway line in Pennsylvania that operated from 1858 to 1870 over the 17-mile (27 km) main line from the terminus in Gettysburg to the 1849 Hanover Junction. After becoming the Susquehanna, Gettysburg & Potomac Railway line in 1870, the tracks between Gettysburg and Hanover Junction became part of the Hanover Junction, Hanover and Gettysburg Railroad in 1874, the Baltimore and Harrisburg Railway in 1886, and the Western Maryland Railway in 1917. Today, its line is part of the CSX Hanover Subdivision.

== History ==
On March 4, 1851, Robert McCurdy, Josiah Benner, and Henry Myers secured a charter for the Gettysburg Railroad Company. The groundbreaking was on February 22, 1856; the first mortgage was issued in 1857, and the railroad opened between Hanover Junction and New Oxford on January 6, 1858 (the first passenger train had entered Adams County on September 14, 1857). After construction commenced from New Oxford on June 24, 1858, a locomotive first entered the Gettysburg borough on November 29. Service from Goulden's Station had begun by September 27, the line was "completed" at Gettysburg on December 1, 1858, with operations over the Gettysburg Railroad Company tracks managed from that date by the Hanover Branch RR until June 12, 1859. The last spike was driven at Gettysburg on December 16, 1858 (12:30 a.m.); and that day at Hanover, company representatives met an official "party of Baltimoreans" with the Blues Band from Calvert railway station. The group arrived at Gettysburg at 3 p.m. where a reception was held at "a large and recently furnished building near the depot". The Gettysburg Railroad Station contracted in the fall opened in May 1859 after the railroad had been the site of a New Oxford riot at the end of December 1858.

=== Civil War ===
On June 27 prior to the 1863 Battle of Gettysburg, the line at Gettysburg was disabled when the nearby Rock Creek bridge was demolished by Confederate forces. On November 18, 1863, President Lincoln used the line to attend the consecration of the Soldiers' National Cemetery where he delivered the Gettysburg Address.

=== Successors ===
The Susquehanna, Gettysburg and Potomac Railway purchased the Gettysburg Railroad on January 20, 1871. That company was consolidated with the Hanover Branch Railroad in 1874 to create the Hanover Junction, Hanover and Gettysburg Railroad. The Hanover Junction, Hanover and Gettysburg Railroad was consolidated with the Bachman Valley Railroad in 1886 to form the Baltimore and Harrisburg Railway. The Baltimore and Harrisburg Railway was one of many companies consolidated in 1917 to create the Western Maryland Railway. In 1973, the Western Maryland became a part of the Chessie System, which later became CSX Transportation on November 1, 1980.

== See also ==
- List of defunct Pennsylvania railroads
