= Hanover Junction, Hanover and Gettysburg Railroad =

Overview
- Headquarters: Hanover, Pennsylvania
- Locale: Adams County and York County, Pennsylvania
- Dates of operation: 1874–1886
- Predecessor: Hanover Branch Railroad, Susquehanna, Gettysburg & Potomac Railway
- Successor: Baltimore and Harrisburg Railway

Technical
- Track gauge: 4 ft 8 1/2 in (1,435 mm) standard gauge
- Length: 38 mi (61 km)

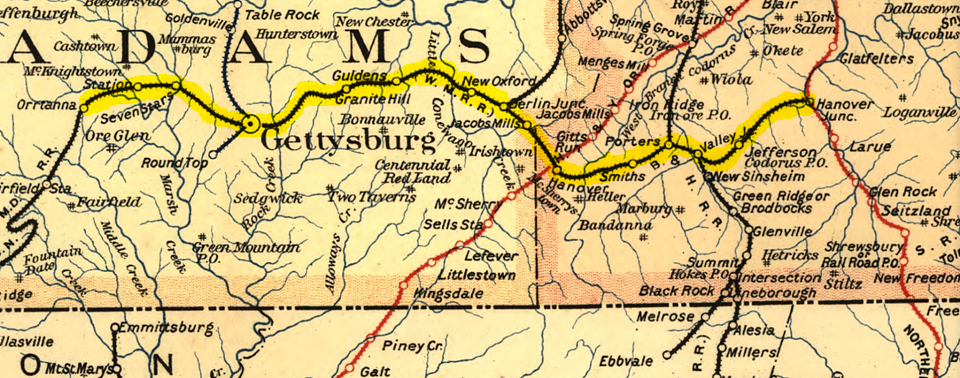
Map from 1895, indicating control by Western Maryland Railway

The Hanover Junction, Hanover and Gettysburg Railroad was a railroad line in Pennsylvania in the 19th century. The 38 mile (61 km) main line ran from Orrtanna to Hanover Junction, where it connected with the Northern Central Railway (a subsidiary of the Pennsylvania Railroad). Connections along the main line were to the Gettysburg and Harrisburg Railroad (at Gettysburg), the Bachman Valley Railroad (Valley Junction), and the Pennsylvania Railroad (Porter's Sideling).

== History ==
The Hanover Junction Company was chartered in 1874 and took over train operations of (merged) the railway lines of the Hanover Branch Railroad and Susquehanna, Gettysburg & Potomac Railway. The railroad was extended from Gettysburg west to Marsh Creek in 1884 and to Orrtanna in 1885.

In 1886 the company merged with the Baltimore and Hanover Railroad and the Bachman Valley Railroad to form the Baltimore and Harrisburg Railway. This new company was controlled by the Western Maryland Railway, and the WM bought the company in 1917. The Hanover Branch portion of track between Hanover Junction and Valley Junction was abandoned and removed c. 1930.

== See also ==
- List of defunct Pennsylvania railroads
