= Hanover Junction Railroad Station =

- U.S. National Register of Historic Places
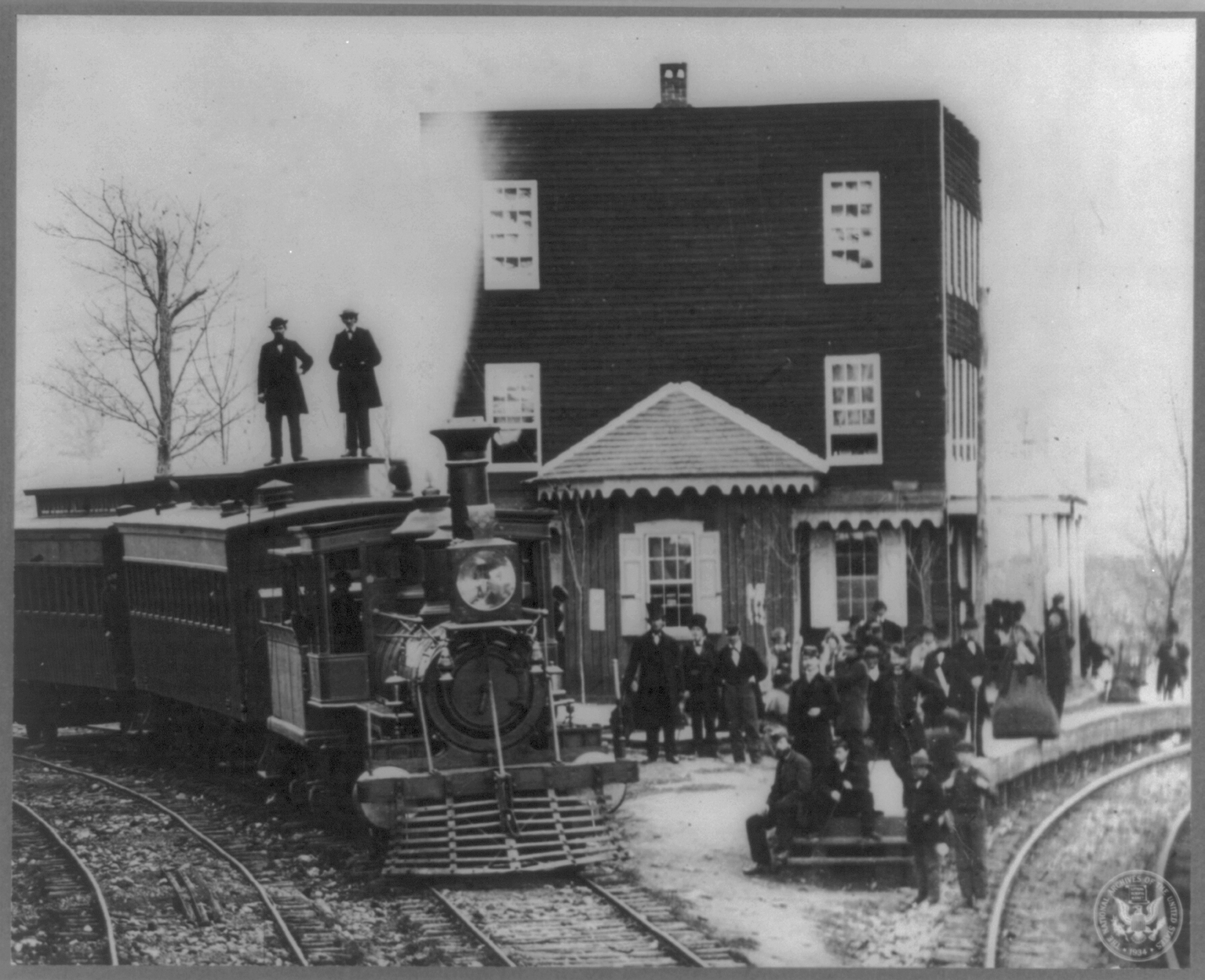
- Hanover Junction RR Station, 1863

- Location within Pennsylvania Location within the United States
- Location: Pennsylvania Route 616 at Hanover Junction, North Codorus Township, Pennsylvania
- Coordinates: 39°50′37″N 76°46′38″W
- Area: 2.5 acres (1.0 ha)
- Built: 1852-1854
- NRHP reference No.: 83004258
- Added to NRHP: December 29, 1983

The Hanover Junction Railroad Station is an historic railroad station which is located in Hanover Junction in North Codorus Township, York County, Pennsylvania.

It was added to the National Register of Historic Places in 1983.

== History ==
Erected between 1852 and 1854, this historic railroad station building is a three-story, three-bay-by-six-bay, rectangular frame building with a flat roof that was built by the Hanover Branch Railroad. It remained in service until the 1920s.

In April 1853, "The Accommodation Train" operated every day except Sundays by the Baltimore and Susquehanna Railroad, logging arrivals and departures between the Hanover Junction Railroad Station and Baltimore, Maryland.

In mid-December 1858, the Gettysburg Railroad was opened for business, beginning with two trains leaving the Carlisle Street train depot in Gettysburg daily, one 7:00 a.m. departure connecting "Hanover Junction with the up-train, for York, Harrisburg, Columbia, and Philadelphia," and a "down-train" departure from Hanover Junction at 12:45 p.m. which took passengers to Baltimore.

By the spring of 1859, express and mail train operations between Hanover Junction and Baltimore were in full swing.

=== American Civil War ===
Following the fall of Fort Sumter in mid-April 1861, during the opening months of the American Civil War, the Hanover Junction Railroad Station became a key transportation hub for the movement of Union Army soldiers from the Commonwealth of Pennsylvania to Maryland, Washington, D.C. and other areas in the southern United States where federal troops were stationed to protect cities, towns, and critical infrastructure points endangered by Confederate States Army incursions. Train traffic through Hanover Junction then continued to grow as horses and supplies were added to the increasing number of Union soldiers being transported as the war turned into a multi-year conflict.

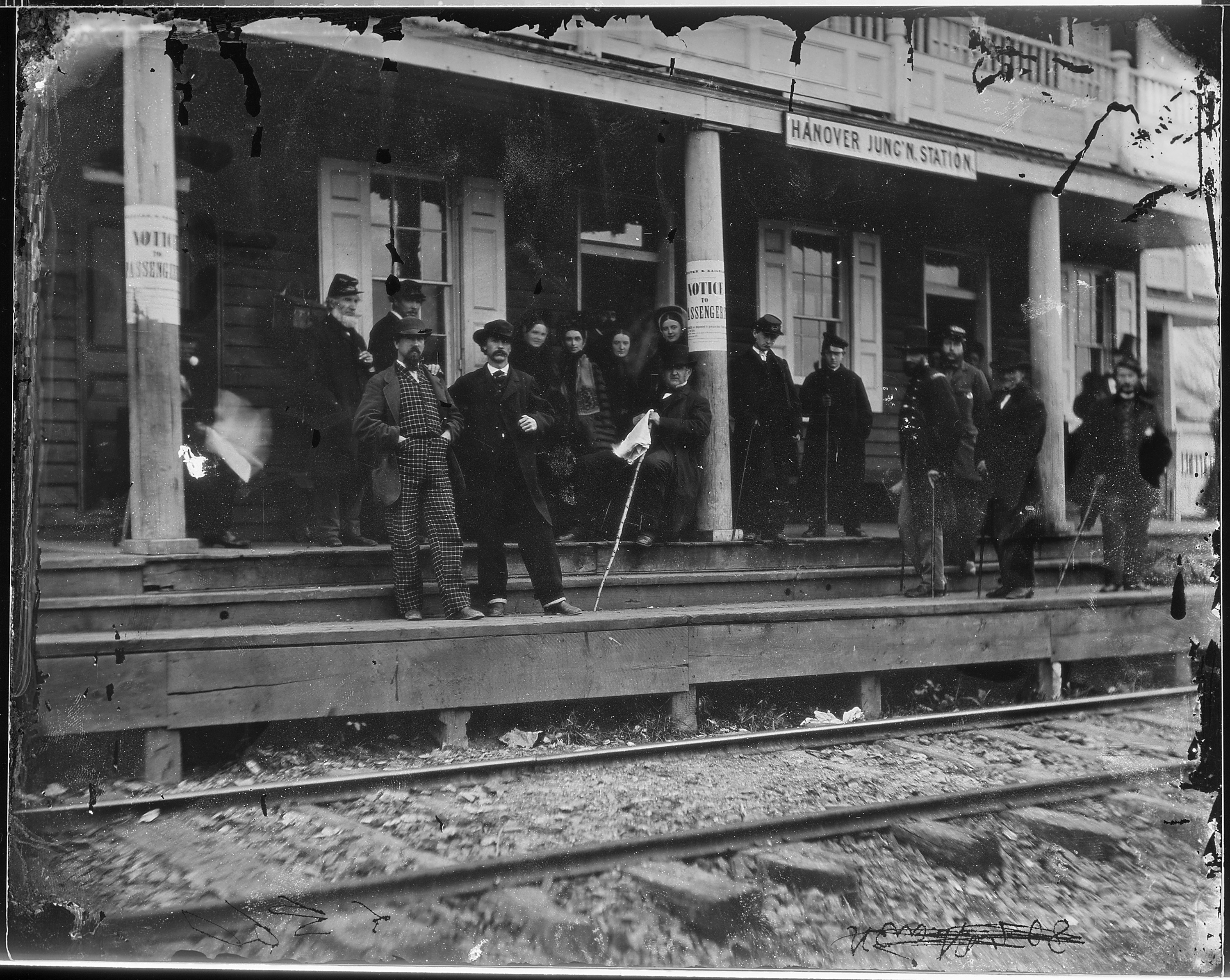
Passengers waiting for a train, Hanover Junction Railroad Station, 1865

In June 1863, the Chicago Tribune, Detroit Free Press, and other newspapers nationwide reported the incursion of Confederate forces into Pennsylvania. On June 27, Confederate troops led by Jubal Early occupied the town of Carlisle, and then advanced toward Hanover Junction, which had been able to maintain telegraph communications with state and military leaders in Harrisburg. The Confederates, who had reached Gettysburg on June 26 and were "in force at Abbottstown and Kingston," subsequently reached the Northern Central Railroad by noon on June 27, where they succeeded in cutting telegraph wires between York and Hanover Junction.

The Battle of Gettysburg was then waged between July 1 and 3. Following the Union Army's victory, which helped turn the tide of war in favor of the federal government, Hanover Junction became a critical hub for transporting thousands of wounded soldiers from the battlefield aide stations where they had received immediate lifesaving care to federal military hospitals in Baltimore, Harrisburg, York, and other northern towns, which had significantly better access to advanced medical treatment options for the severe traumatic injuries that many of the soldiers had received.

Between November 18 and 19, 1863, President Abraham Lincoln traveled through Hanover Junction to and from the dedication ceremonies for the Gettysburg National Cemetery. A series of photographs taken around this time are believed, by some historians, to have captured Lincoln standing on the station's platform; however, other historians have disputed this claim, citing the travel schedules of Lincoln, his bodyguard Ward Lamon, and others who traveled separately from Lincoln as proof that the photos do not show Lincoln waiting for a train.

In February 1864, members of the Pennsylvania Legislature debated requiring the Hanover Branch Railroad to improve its infrastructure and passenger train service between Hanover Junction and the borough of Hanover.

=== Post-Civil War to early 1900s ===
In May 1865, the Northern Central Railway completed construction of a double track between Baltimore and Hanover Junction. A new coaling depot that would service freight engines at Hanover Junction was also erected.

Later that same year, on November 22, a Baltimore Express train scheduled to arrive Pittsburgh derailed near Hanover Junction. The train's engine, two passenger cars and a baggage car were destroyed, the brakeman was mortally wounded and several passengers sustained minor injuries.

=== Recent history ===
This railroad station building was added to the National Register of Historic Places in 1983.

The station now houses a museum with Civil War images, models of the various configurations of the building over the years, memorabilia, and other displays. It is also a restroom stop for the York County Heritage Rail Trail, a bicycle and walking path which parallels the old tracks of the Northern Central Railway.

== Gallery ==
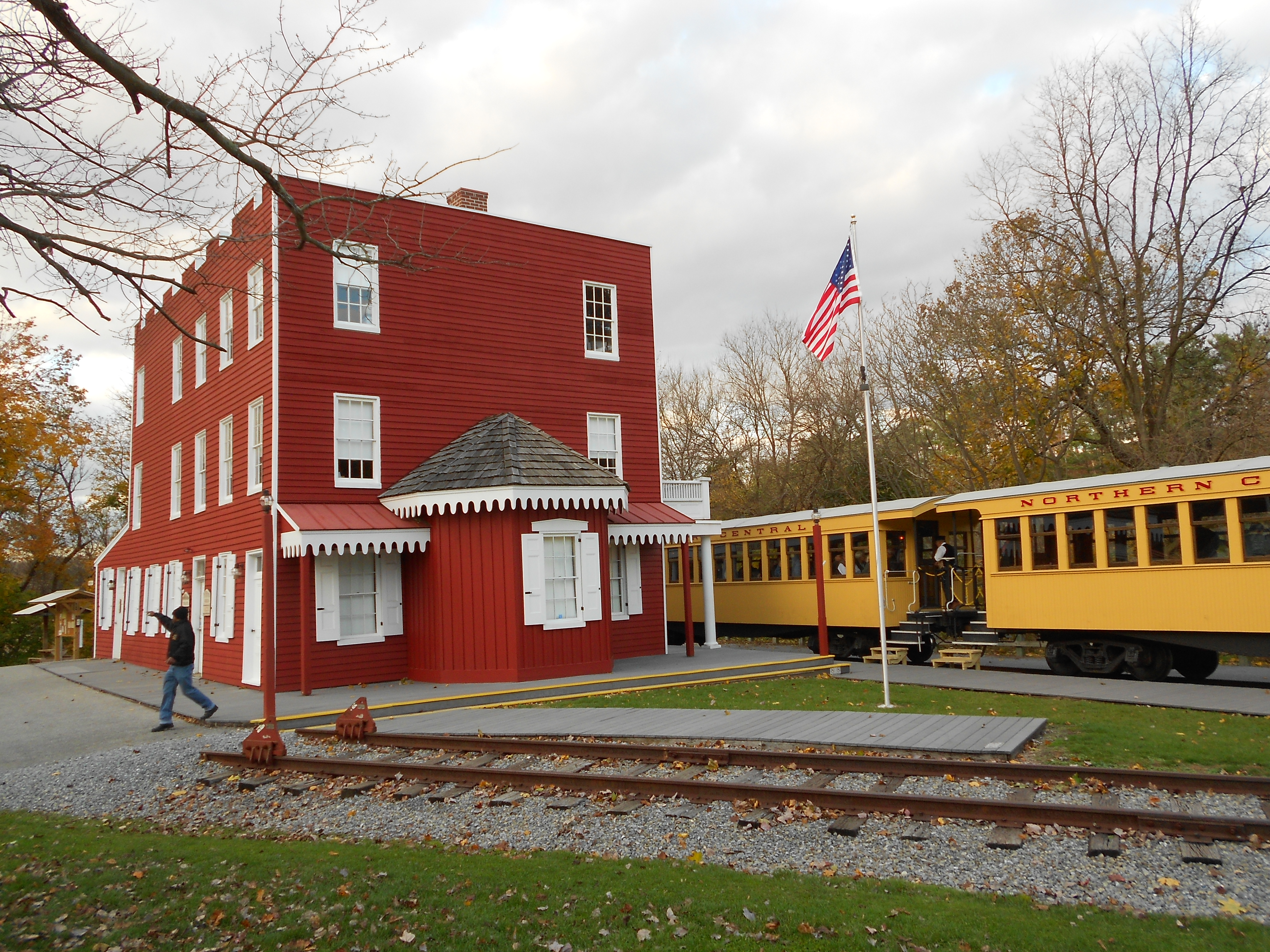
Hanover Junction Railroad Station in 2013

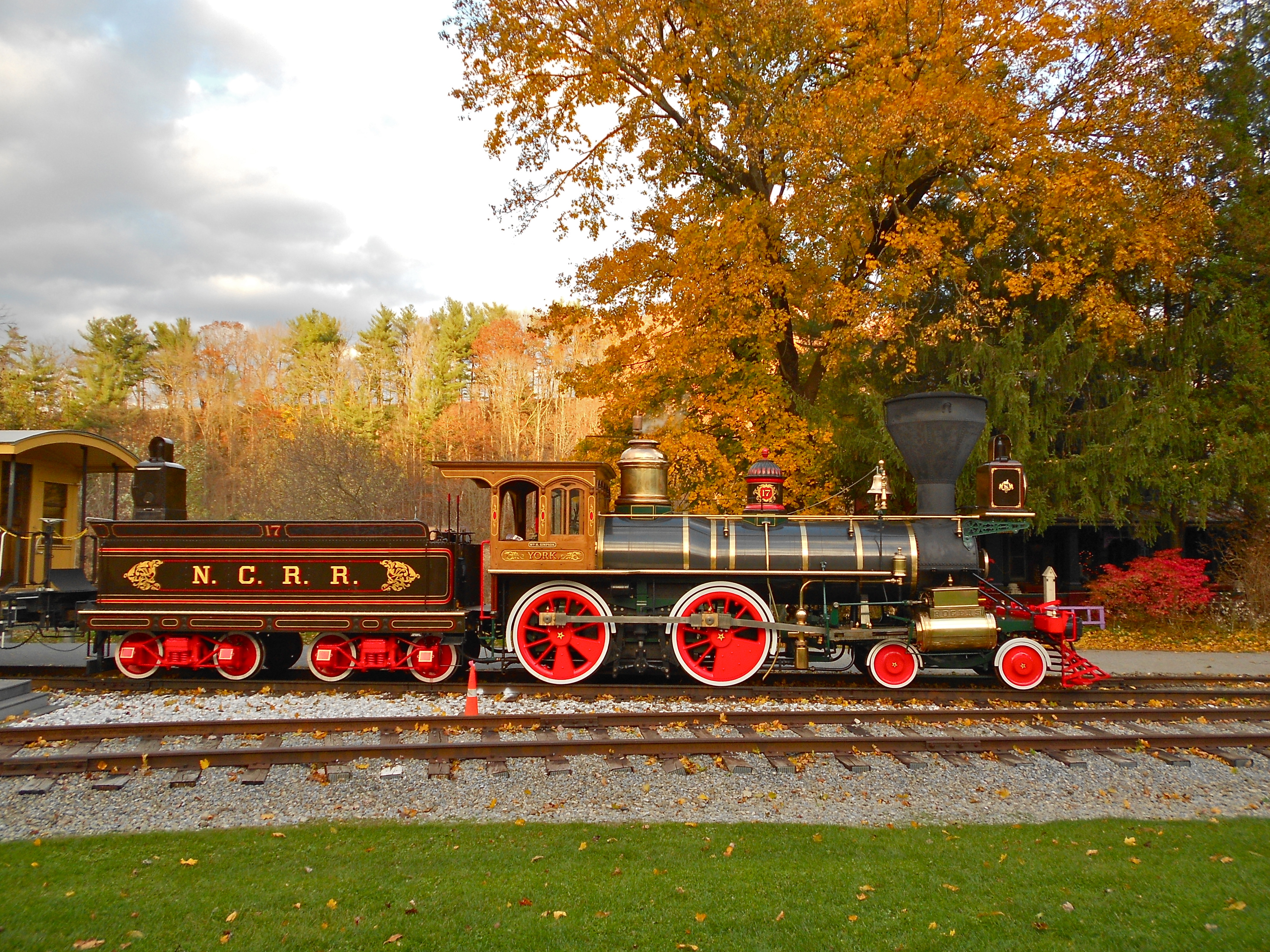
The steam locomotive, "York," at Hanover Junction, in 2013
