= Bachman Valley Railroad =

Defunct railroad that operated in Pennsylvania and Maryland, United States

Overview
- Headquarters: Hanover, Pennsylvania
- Locale: Pennsylvania and Maryland
- Dates of operation: 1873–1922
- Successor: Baltimore and Harrisburg Railway

Technical
- Track gauge: 4 ft 8 1/2 in (1,435 mm) standard gauge
- Length: 13 mi (21 km)

The Bachman Valley Railroad (BV) was a railroad that operated in Pennsylvania and Maryland, United States, in the 19th century. The 13 mile (21 km) line ran from Valley Junction, Pennsylvania (5.5 mi (8.9 km) east of Hanover) to Ebbvale, Maryland (slightly north of Manchester). The railroad was built to transport iron ore to local blast furnaces; it also carried some passengers. The railroad became part of the Western Maryland Railway in 1917.

== History ==
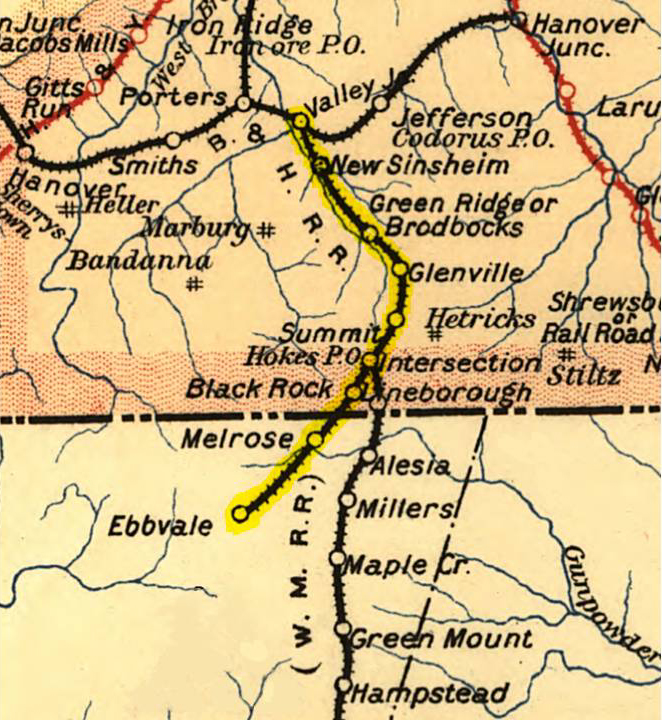
Bachman Valley Railroad map from 1895, after merger into Baltimore & Harrisburg Railway.

The railroad was chartered by the state of Pennsylvania and separately in Maryland, in 1871. At Valley Junction it connected with the Hanover Branch Railroad. At Ebbvale the line terminated at an iron ore mine. The railroad began operation in early 1873. The rolling stock was provided by the Hanover Junction, Hanover and Gettysburg Railroad, which operated the railroad.

In 1879 the Baltimore and Hanover Railroad connected to Bachman Valley near Lineboro. This new line ran south to Emory Grove, where it connected with the WM. In 1886 the BV merged with the Baltimore and Hanover Railroad and the Hanover Junction, Hanover and Gettysburg Railroad to form the Baltimore and Harrisburg Railway. The merged main line ran from Valley Junction to Emory Grove. The new company was controlled by the Western Maryland, and the WM bought the company in 1917. Mines in the Ebbvale area closed in the early 20th century and the section of track from Black Rock to Ebbvale was abandoned around 1922.

== See also ==
- List of defunct Maryland railroads
- List of defunct Pennsylvania railroads
