= Hanover Junction, Pennsylvania =

Unincorporated area in Pennsylvania, US

- Unincorporated community
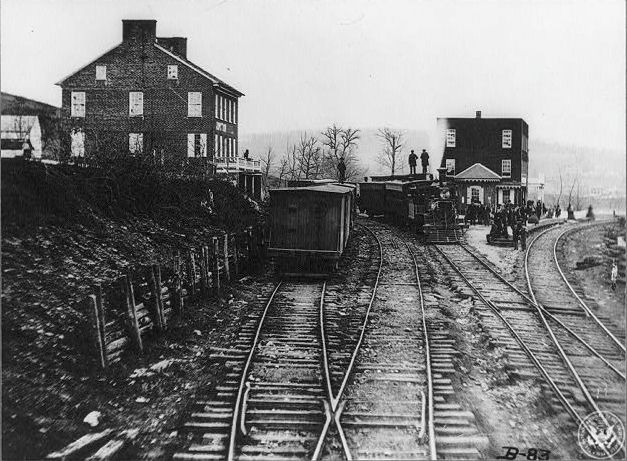
- Proximity of Hanover Junction homes to town's railroad station, 1863

- Location within Pennsylvania
- Coordinates: 39°51′22″N 76°46′01″W
- Country: United States
- State: Pennsylvania
- County: York
- Settled: 1851

Area
  - Total: 0.3 sq mi (0.78 km^{2})
- Elevation: 476 ft (145 m)
- Time zone: UTC-5 (Eastern (EST))
  - Summer (DST): UTC-4 (EDT)
- Zip code: 17360
- Area code: 717

Hanover Junction is a small unincorporated community, which is located in south-central York County, Pennsylvania, United States, near the borough of Seven Valleys. The junction serves as a rest stop on the York County Heritage Rail Trail.

The Hanover Junction Railroad Station, a historic transit building in Hanover Junction dating to the 1850s, was added to the National Register of Historic Places in 1983.

== History ==
Established in 1851 as a railroad junction of the Northern Central Railway and the Hanover Branch Railroad, a hotel and a few houses were quickly erected to serve the needs of railroad passengers and local workers.

In early 1853, newspapers reported arrivals and departures, at the Hanover Junction Railroad Station, of "The Accommodation Train" from and to Baltimore, Maryland. This train was operated by the Baltimore and Susquehanna Railroad every day except Sundays.

In mid-December 1858, newspapers reported that the Gettysburg Railroad had officially opened for business. Two trains left Gettysburg's Carlisle Street depot daily, one departing at 7:00 a.m. that connected "Hanover Junction with the up-train, for York, Harrisburg, Columbia, and Philadelphia," and the "down-train" that left Hanover Junction at 12:45 p.m. and transported passengers to Baltimore.

By the spring of 1859, the Gettysburg Railroad was operating express and mail trains between Hanover Junction and Baltimore.

=== American Civil War ===
In April 1861, during the opening months of the American Civil War, Hanover Junction became a frequent gathering point for Union Army soldiers from the Commonwealth of Pennsylvania for transportation to and from points south, where they were stationed to protect the nation's capital city, Washington, D.C., and other sites that were endangered by advancing Confederate States Army troops. As the war widened, train traffic expanded through Hanover Junction as horses and supplies were transported south with Union soldiers in greater and greater numbers.

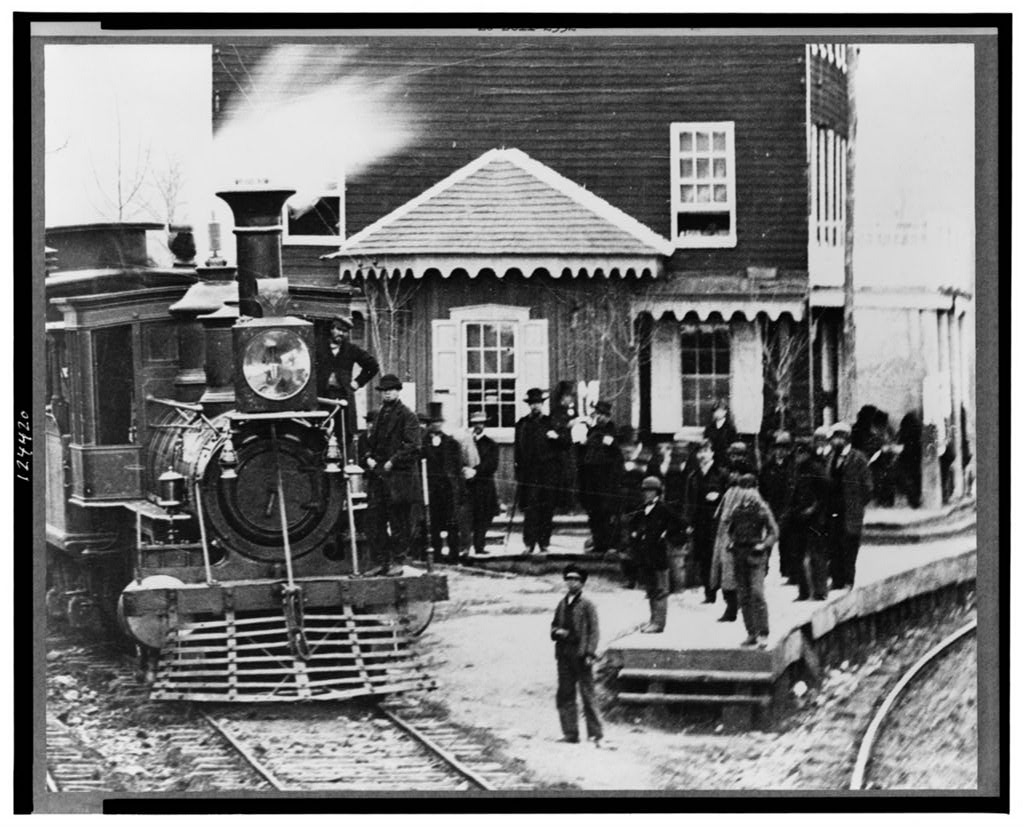
Hanover Junction station, 1863

In June 1863, major newspapers across the United States carried reports regarding the advance of Confederate troops toward and into Pennsylvania. During the morning of June 27, the town of Carlisle was occupied by Confederate forces, which then began pressing forward toward the town of Gettysburg and threatening Hanover Junction, which was reportedly still in communication by telegraph with state officials and military leaders in the capital city of Harrisburg. Communications were then halted shortly thereafter when Confederate troops cut the telegraph wires between York and Hanover Junction. News reports at that point indicated that Confederate troops led by Jubal Early, which had reached Gettysburg on June 26 and were "in force at Abbottstown and Kingston," had reached the Northern Central Railroad sometime around noon on June 27, where they were able to hamper Union Army leaders from communicating by telegraph with their superiors in Harrisburg.

During the siege of Hanover Junction young John Shearer had the forethought to throw the telegraph key out of the window where it was unable to be found by the Confederate raiders. After their departure, he was able to retrieve the key and thus restore communications between the Union commanders and the War Department in Washington. According to local legend, he stayed awake at the telegraph key for the duration supplied with generous amounts of coffee provided by the inhabitants of a village within earshot of the artillery roar some thirty miles west

Following the 1863 Battle of Gettysburg, Hanover Junction became a major route for the transport of wounded soldiers from Gettysburg to hospitals in Baltimore, Harrisburg, York, and other Northern towns.

A bust of President Abraham Lincoln and a historical marker commemorate Lincoln's change of trains at the junction while he was traveling to Gettysburg to deliver his 1863 Gettysburg Address.

In February 1864, a bill was introduced in the Pennsylvania Legislature to compel the Hanover Branch Railroad to upgrade its infrastructure and increase the frequency of passenger train service between Hanover Junction and the borough of Hanover.

=== Post-Civil War to early 1900s ===
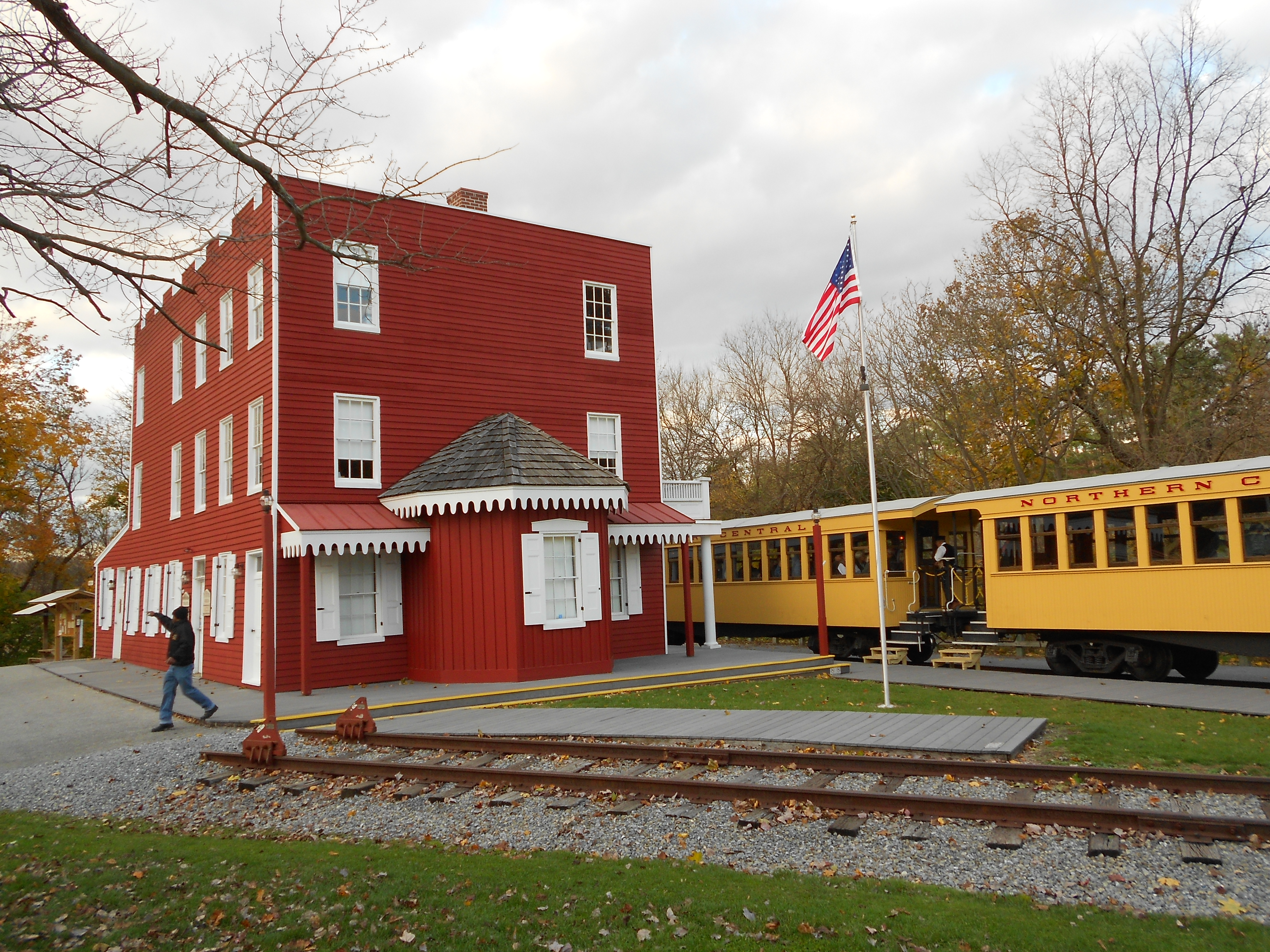
Hanover Junction Railroad Station with historic North Central Railroad train, c. 2013

In May 1865, construction of a double track was completed on the Northern Central Railroad's line between Baltimore and Hanover Junction. The construction of a new coaling depot that would service freight engines at Hanover Junction was also completed by this time.

On November 22, 1865, a Baltimore Express train headed for Pittsburgh derailed near Hanover Junction, destroying the engine, as well as two passenger cars and the baggage car, and mortally wounding the brakeman. Several passengers also received minor bruises.

Small industries flourished in the Hanover Junction area during the late 1800s and early 1900s. In early 1872, the Pennsylvania Legislature passed an act, which enabled the incorporation of the Susquehanna and Hanover Junction Railroad Company, and gave railroad executives the authority to begin construction of a new railroad line between Hanover Junction and the east bank of the Susquehanna River, and to also erect a new railroad bridge if necessary.

With the demise of railroad traffic during the mid-twentieth century, however, the depot was abandoned.

=== Recent history ===
The Hanover Junction Railroad Station was added to the National Register of Historic Places in 1983.

Hanover Junction was restored to its American Civil War-era appearance in 2003 and reopened as a museum. Four Civil War cannons commemorate the region's participation in the Gettysburg campaign.
