= Porters Sideling, Pennsylvania =

Unincorporated community in Pennsylvania, US

Coordinates: 39°49′31″N 76°53′41″W

Porters Sideling is an unincorporated community located in Heidelberg Township in York County, Pennsylvania, United States. Porters Sideling is located approximately one mile southeast of Pennsylvania Route 116 and is about 3 miles away from Codorus State Park. It is also four miles from Spring Grove, Pennsylvania. The Hanover Subdivision Goes through town, at the interchange CSX meets York Railway.

Train Timetable The time that trains move though is different every week, but it comes at the same time every week. Weekdays at 8-11 AM York Railway normally moves thought Porters. Every night at 10pm or 3am a CSX rock train comes though. Norfolk Southern comes though the York Railway line to turn around, But this is very rare.
