= Baltimore and Hanover Railroad =

Defunct railroad that operated in Maryland

Map

The Baltimore and Hanover Railroad (B&H) was a railroad that operated in Maryland in the 19th century. The 20 mile (32 km) main line ran from Emory Grove, Maryland north to the Pennsylvania state line near Black Rock Junction, where it connected with the Bachman Valley Railroad.

The B&H was chartered by the Maryland General Assembly in 1877 and began operation in 1879. The railroad was operated by the Hanover Junction, Hanover and Gettysburg Railroad.

In 1886 the B&H merged with the Bachman Valley and the Hanover Junction, Hanover and Gettysburg to form the Baltimore and Harrisburg Railway. The Baltimore and Harrisburg was controlled by the Western Maryland Railway, and the WM bought the company in 1917.

== See also ==
- List of defunct Maryland railroads
