= Western Maryland Railway =

Freight railroad in Appalachia

Overview
- Headquarters: Baltimore, Maryland, U.S.
- Reporting mark: WM
- Locale: Maryland, Pennsylvania and West Virginia
- Dates of operation: 1852–1983
- Successor: Baltimore and Ohio (later CSX)

Technical
- Track gauge: 4 ft 8 1/2 in (1,435 mm) standard gauge
- Length: 835 miles (1,344 km)

The Western Maryland Railway (reporting mark WM), nicknamed the Wild Mary, was a small American Class I railroad that operated from 1852 to 1983 in 3 Mid-Atlantic States, Maryland (Western Region), West Virginia (Eastern Region), and Pennsylvania (Southern Region) across the Allegheny Regions of the Appalachian Mountains with its headquarters in Baltimore, Maryland. The Wild Mary was primarily a coal hauling and heavy freight railroad, with a small passenger train operation up until 1958 when the WM discontinued all of its passenger service.

The WM later became property of the Chessie System holding company along with the B&O and C&O in 1973. Although despite being a holding company the Chessie System allowed the WM to continue independent operations up until May 1975 after which many of its lines were largely abandoned in favor of parallel Baltimore and Ohio Railroad (B&O) lines.

In 1983, the WM was fully merged into the B&O, which later was also merged with the former Chesapeake and Ohio Railway (C&O) into the Chessie System in 1987. The Chessie System then merged with the Seaboard System to form CSX Transportation later that year.

== History ==
=== 19th century ===
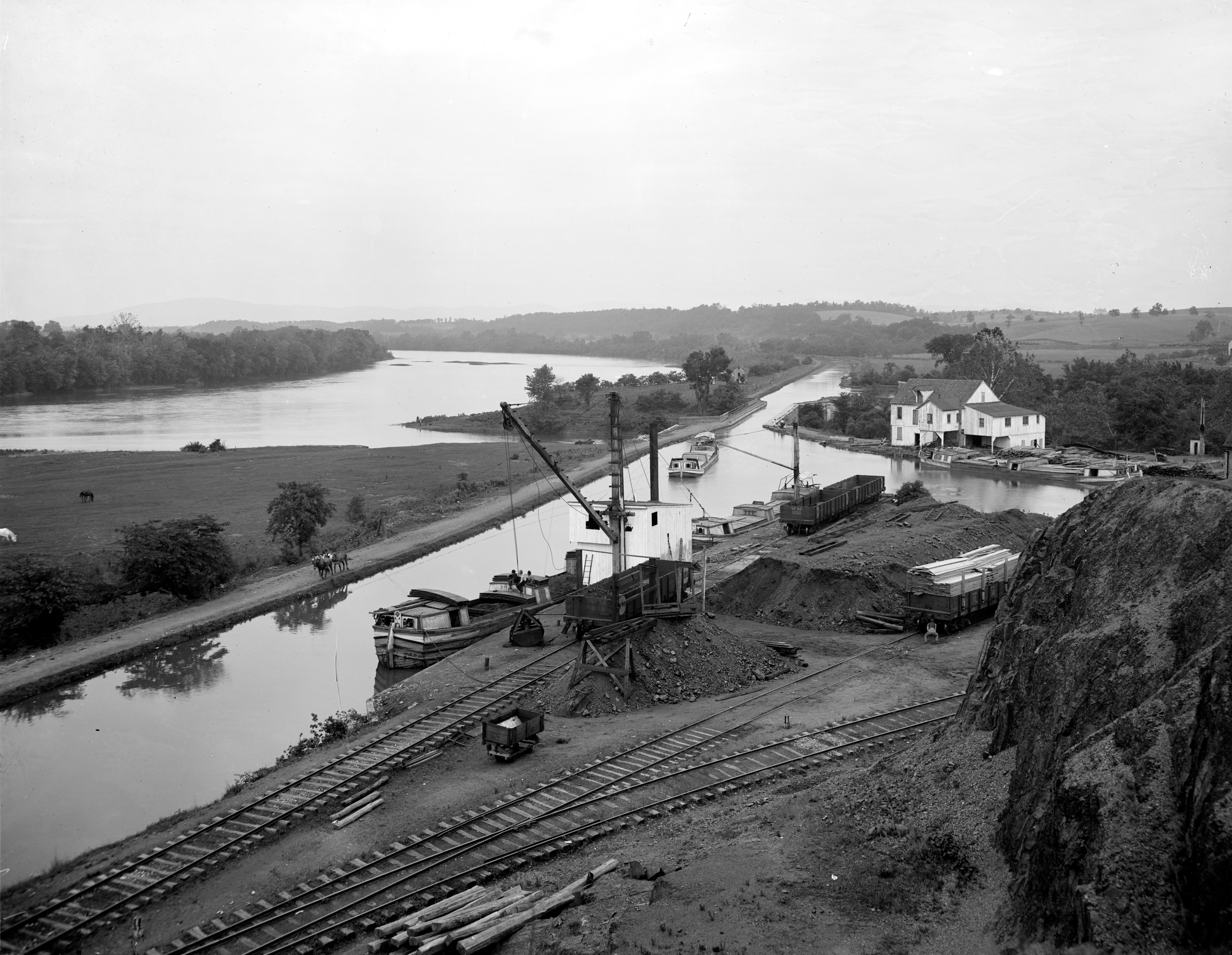
Williamsport on the C&O Canal was the WM's western terminus from 1873, and its principal source of coal traffic until the main line was extended to Cumberland in 1906

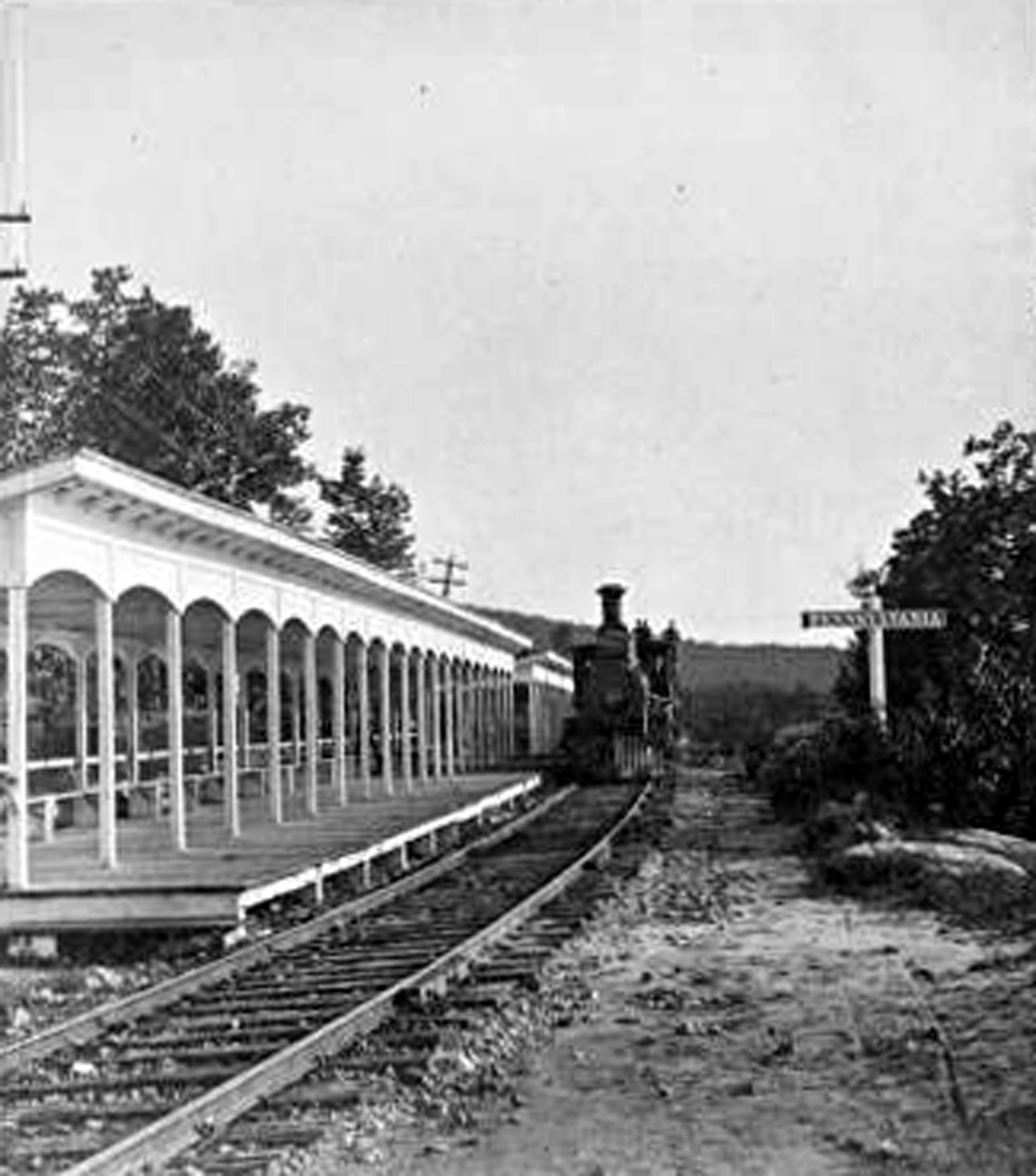
The station in Pen Mar, Maryland, c. 1878; the Western Maryland Railway built Pen Mar Park as a mountain resort in 1877 and ran excursion trains to it from Baltimore. The park closed in 1943.

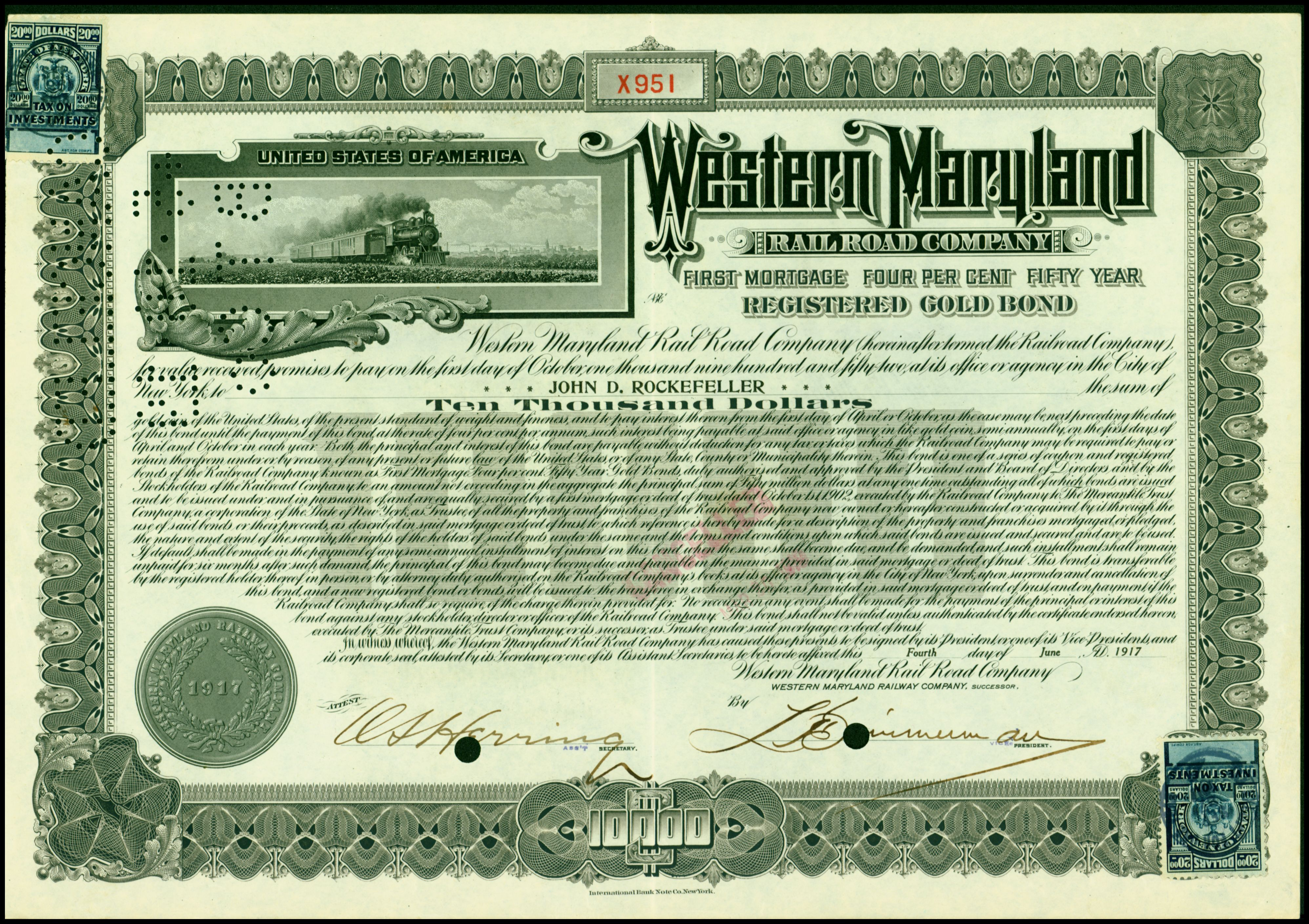
A Western Maryland Rail Road Company gold bond, issued 1917

The original main line began with the chartering of the Baltimore, Carroll and Frederick Railroad in 1852, with the intent of building a rail line from Baltimore west to Washington County, Maryland. The Maryland General Assembly changed the name of the company to the Western Maryland Rail Road Company in 1853, and construction began from Owings Mills in 1857. An existing Northern Central Railway branch line terminating at Owings Mills was used to connect into Baltimore.

The railroad was completed to Westminster in 1861 and Union Bridge in 1862. Further expansion was delayed because of the Civil War. Westward construction resumed in 1868 under Chief Engineer Joseph S. Gitt, and the line was completed to Hagerstown in 1872. This section became the East Subdivision. The company's first major car shops were established at Union Bridge.

In 1873, the WM built its own line from Owings Mills to Fulton Junction in Baltimore, and obtained trackage rights from the Baltimore and Potomac Railroad (B&P) for the remaining two miles of the route eastward to Calvert Street Station (Later replaced by Union Station (which still later was called Penn Station)). It built a branch east of Union Station to Hillen Station, which opened in 1876 and became the company headquarters. The WM built a connection from Hagerstown to Williamsport, in order to access coal traffic from the Chesapeake and Ohio Canal.

Under the leadership of company president John Mifflin Hood, the railway made its first extension into Pennsylvania by leasing a line from Edgemont, Maryland, to Waynesboro and Shippensburg. This line became the Lurgan Subdivision and was leased from the Baltimore and Cumberland Valley Railroad in 1881, and was connected to the Harrisburg and Potomac Railroad in 1886.

A second route into Pennsylvania, the Hanover Subdivision, was acquired by the WM when it gained control of the Baltimore and Hanover Railroad, and the Gettysburg Railroad, in late 1886. This line connected to the WM main at Emory Grove, proceeded north to Hanover and Gettysburg, then southwest to connect again to the WM at Highfield, Maryland, near the Pennsylvania border. A branch from Porters to York, Pennsylvania was completed in 1893; this became the York Subdivision.

The West Virginia Central and Pittsburgh Railway (WVC&P) began as a narrow gauge line in 1880, its name and gauge changed in 1881 and in the ensuing years it opened a huge swath of timber and coal territory in the Allegheny Highlands of West Virginia. The railroad was directly responsible for the creation of such towns as Davis, Thomas, and Parsons.

The WM established a connection with the B&O in 1892 with the opening of the Potomac Valley Railroad, controlled by WM, between Williamsport and Big Pool, Maryland. This connection brought a major increase in through-freight traffic. Construction of an extension from Hagerstown to Cumberland began in 1903 and completed in 1906. This became the West Subdivision. To service the expanded system, the WM built a major shop complex at Hagerstown in 1909, with a roundhouse, machine shops and related facilities. Rail yards at Hagerstown were also expanded.

The WVC&P established the Coal and Iron Railway (C&I) in 1899 to reach logging operations and a connection with the C&O Railway. The route left Elkins, West Virginia and the Tygart Valley River drainage by way of a tunnel under Cheat Mountain, followed the Shavers Fork river upstream and then the West Fork Greenbrier River down from its headwaters to Durbin in Pocahontas County, where it connected with the C&O Greenbrier Division.

=== 20th century ===
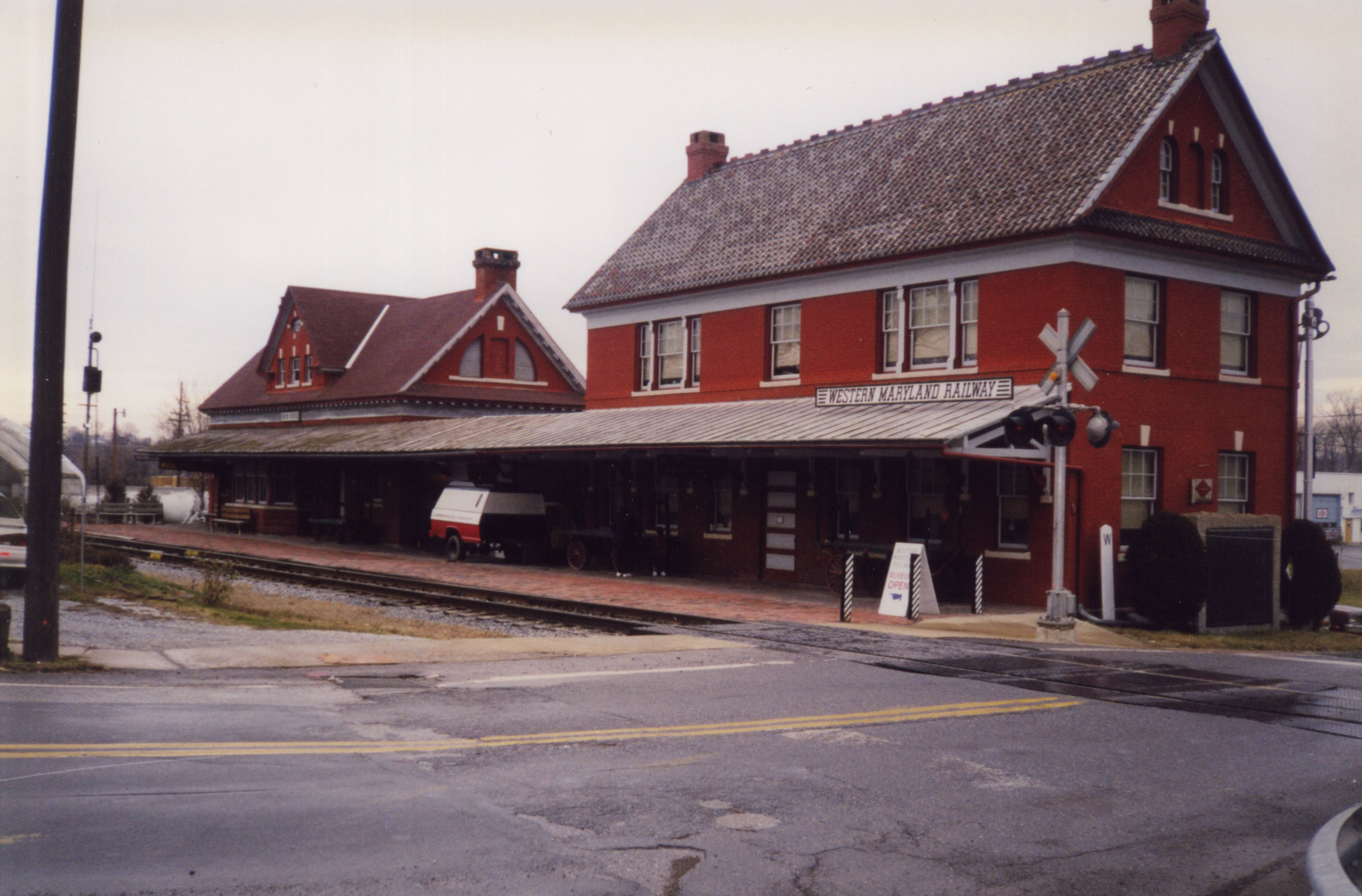
Union Bridge station, built in 1902

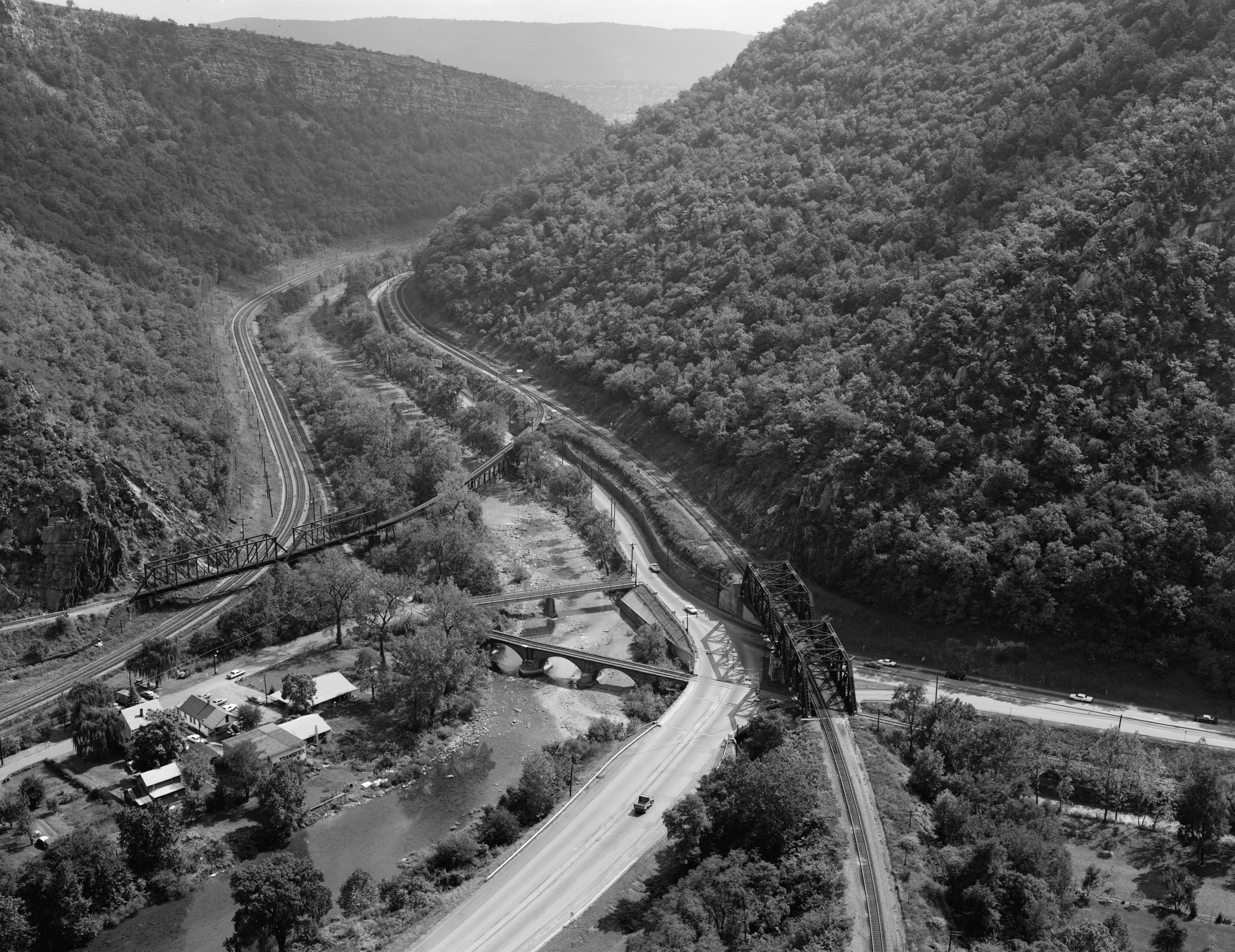
Eckhart Junction in the Cumberland Narrows in 1970; the masonry arch bridge over Wills Creek was built by the Maryland Mining Company in 1860 as part of the Eckhart Branch Railroad. Beyond the masonry bridge is a viaduct for the State Line Branch.

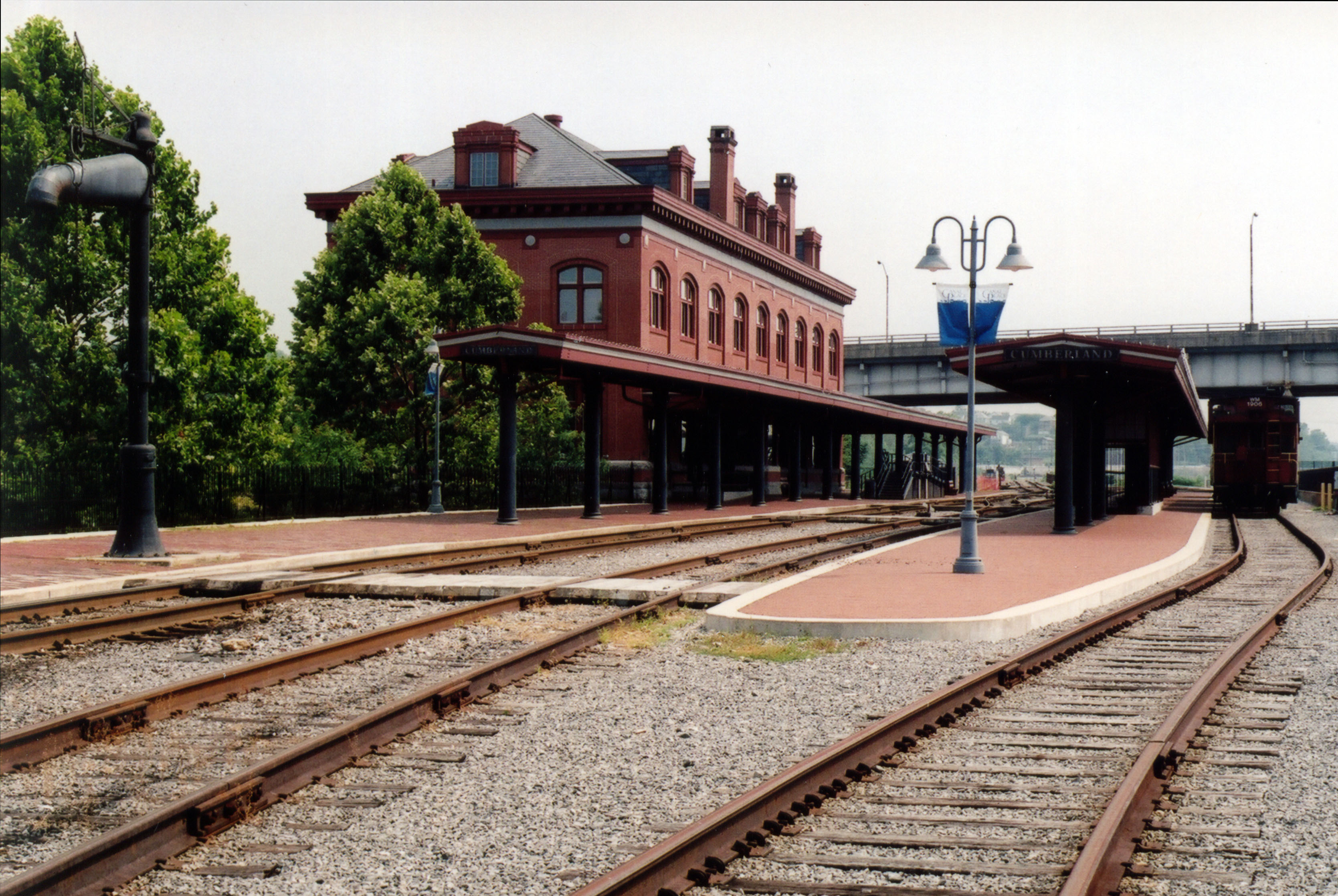
The Western Maryland Railway Station in Cumberland, built in 1913

Western Maryland Railway in the 1950s

Hillen Station in Baltimore in 1950

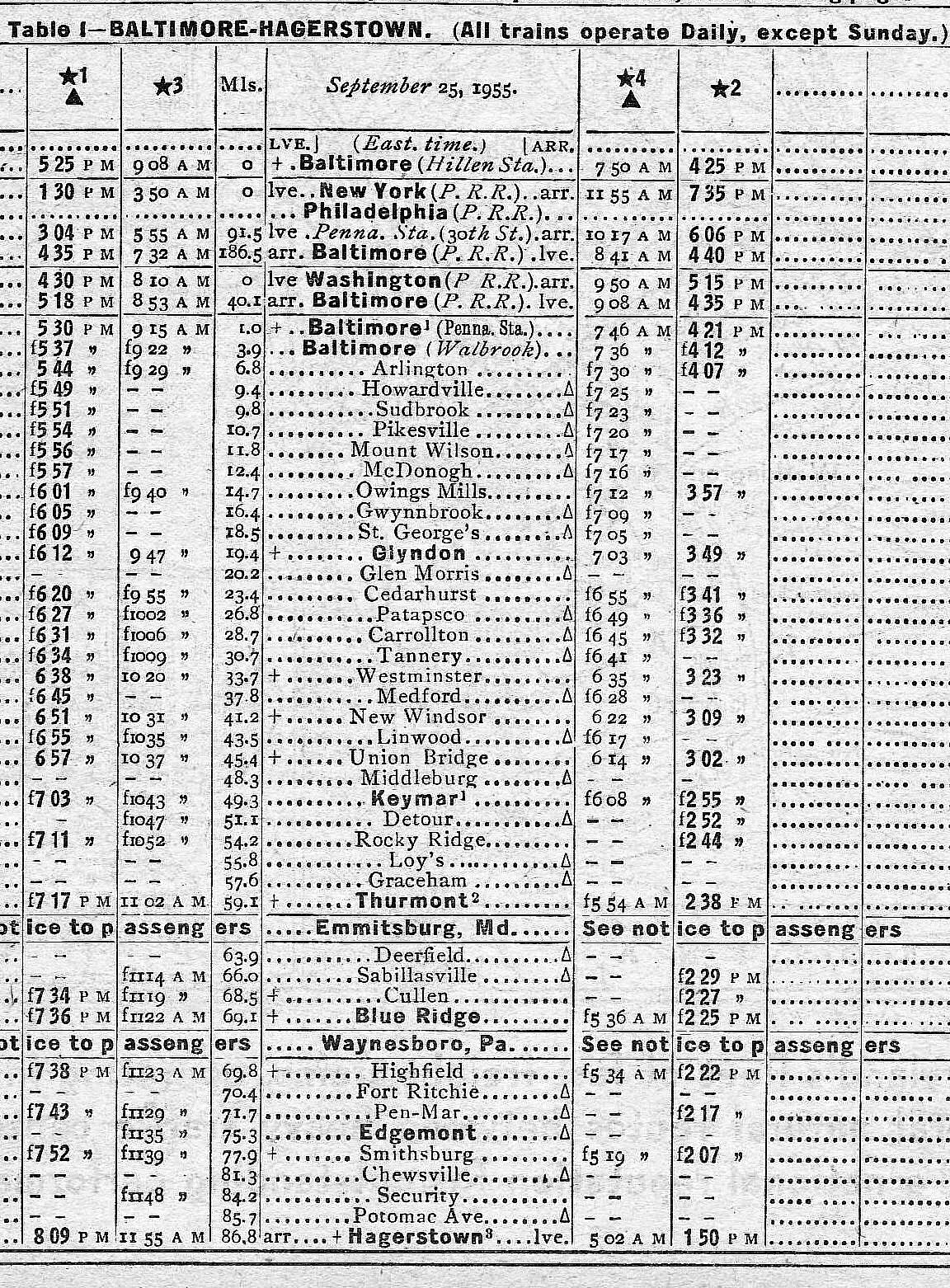
A 1955 Western Maryland Railway passenger train schedule

The Fuller Syndicate, led by George Gould, purchased a controlling interest in the WM in 1902 and made plans for westward expansion of the system. In 1904, the WM completed construction of a large marine terminal at Port Covington, on the Patapsco River in Baltimore, to support the Gould organization's expansion plans. The terminal facilities included coal, grain and merchandise piers, overhead cranes, eleven rail yards, warehouses, a roundhouse, a turntable and a machine shop. During the 1920s, rotary dumpers for coal and coke were installed, and a large grain elevator.

Construction to Durbin was complete by 1903. With the acquisition of the WVC&P in 1905, the C&I became part of WM and this line became the Durbin Subdivision.

In 1905, 26 men, all employees of the Western Maryland, were killed in a head-on collision in Patapsco after the crew of a freight train misjudged the schedule of a passenger train. It was the deadliest wreck in the railway's history.

In 1907, the syndicate acquired several railroad companies, including the George's Creek and Cumberland Railroad (GC&C), which had built a line west through the Cumberland Narrows, and then south to Lonaconing, Maryland. Using the portion of the line through the Narrows, the Connellsville Extension was built west from Cumberland to Connellsville, Pennsylvania, beginning in 1910, and it was completed in 1912. At Connellsville the WM connected with the Pittsburgh and Lake Erie Railroad (P&LE).

In 1915, the WM obtained trackage rights on a B&O line from Bowest Junction, 2 miles south of Connellsville, to Chiefton, West Virginia, which provided access to coal mines in the area west of Fairmont, West Virginia.

The GC&C line provided the WM with access to mines in the Georges Creek Valley. In 1927, the WM abandoned some of the GC&C track and accessed additional mines in the area through trackage rights on the Cumberland and Pennsylvania Railroad (C&P). In 1944 the WM purchased the C&P, and formally merged the operations in 1953.

Although never a giant, the Connellsville subdivision of WM handled through-midwest fast freight traffic and coal from company-owned mines near Fairmont and Somerset, Pennsylvania.

WM opened a passenger station in Cumberland and one in Hagerstown in 1913. The Cumberland station contained the offices for the Western Division. The building, which is called Canal Place, is operated by the National Park Service and includes the station for the Western Maryland Scenic Railroad and a visitors center for the C&O Canal National Historical Park. The Cumberland site was added to the National Register of Historic Places in 1973. The Hagerstown station was added to the National Register of Historic Places in 1976.

In 1913 the WM changed the name of its Finksburg, Maryland station to "Asbestos" in respect for the local Baltimore Roofing and Asbestos Company, to the consternation of local residents. This led to the area by the station (a half mile from town) and factory being called Asbestos, Maryland at least into the 1930s. Subsequently the area has been referred to as "Cedarhurst."

In the large valley near the mouth of Leading Creek and the Tygart Valley River, the WVC&P constructed the city of Elkins. Named after investor Stephen Benton Elkins, Elkins was home to a large rail yard for the railroad and served as the hub of Western Maryland and Chessie System operations in the region well into the 1980s.

The WVC&P was sold to the Fuller Syndicate in 1902 and was merged into the Western Maryland in 1905. Known as the Thomas Subdivision, the line connected to the Western Maryland mainline at Maryland Junction, south of Cumberland. This line, famous for its Black Water Grade in Blackwater Canyon, became an important part of the Western Maryland's success until its eventual abandonment in the 1970s.

In 1927, the WM purchased the Greenbrier, Cheat and Elk Railroad, which ran from Cheat Junction, on the Durbin sub, to Bergoo. This line became the GC&E Subdivision. In 1929, WM's purchase of a line from the West Virginia Midland Railway extended the GC&E sub southward to Webster Springs. While these lines were originally built as logging railroads, the WM also used them for coal operations.

The Fuller Syndicate attempted to assemble its own transcontinental railroad system beginning around 1902, by acquiring various rail lines. It faced stiff competition from the Pennsylvania Railroad (PRR), the B&O and others, and became financially overextended in its expansion plans. As a result, the WM entered receivership in 1908. A new corporation, the Western Maryland Railway Company, was formed and purchased the WM assets in 1909, and the receivership ended in 1910.

In 1931, the Pittsburgh and West Virginia Railway (P&WV) reached Connellsville to connect with the WM. The connection enabled the formation of the Alphabet Route, a partnership involving the WM, P&WV and six other railroads that provided competition with larger railroads including the PRR. Today the P&WV is leased by the Wheeling and Lake Erie Railway.

The major rail yards on the WM were Jamison Yard at Hagerstown, capacity 3,000 cars, mainly for west-bound traffic; and Knobmount Yard, capacity 1,600 cars, south of Ridgeley, West Virginia, mainly for east-bound traffic.

The WM began using diesel locomotives in 1941 for yard operations, and for regular line use in 1949. It discontinued use of steam locomotives in 1954, despite receiving new ones as late as 1947 with its J-1 class 4-8-4s, the last new design of the wheel arrangement to be developed.

Passenger service on the WM began in 1859. The WM's original Hillen Street Station in downtown Baltimore was demolished in 1954. A smaller replacement Baltimore station was briefly used between 1954–1957.

Revenue passenger-miles declined from 26 million in 1925 to 2 million in 1956. The WM ended passenger service to Shippensburg in 1942. It ended its passenger service on its Baltimore-Owings Mills-Thurmont-Hagerstown mainline route in 1957. Service on its Cumberland-to-Elkins line ended between 1957 and 1958. Passenger service on its final remaining line, a three-day-a-week mixed train between Elkins and Durbin, ended in 1959.

In 1964, the C&O and the B&O jointly filed for permission to acquire control of the Western Maryland Railway with the Interstate Commerce Commission (ICC). The ICC approved the acquisition in 1968.

In 1973, as part of the Chessie System, Western Maryland ownership went to C&O and it was operated by the B&O. The B&O itself merged with the C&O in 1987, which itself became part of CSX Transportation.

== Legacy ==
Much of the original WM west of Big Pool has been abandoned including the 2,375-foot (724 m) summit of the Allegheny Mountains and the Eastern Continental Divide near Deal, Pennsylvania. In addition to CSX, portions of the former WM are now operated by Durbin & Greenbrier Valley Railroad, the Maryland Midland Railway (MMID), Western Maryland Scenic Railroad, Pennsylvania & Southern Railway and York Railway. A portion of the former WM roadbed in Baltimore is now used by the Baltimore Metro Subway going northwest from downtown to Owings Mills, Maryland in Baltimore County.

Other portions are now rail trails. These include the Western Maryland Rail Trail in Maryland; the Blackwater Canyon Trail and Allegheny Highlands Trail in West Virginia, and the Great Allegheny Passage in Maryland and Pennsylvania.

In Allegany County, Maryland, the C&O Canal National Historical Park includes the Western Maryland Railroad Right-of-Way, Milepost 126 to Milepost 160, listed on the National Register of Historic Places in 1981, and the Western Maryland Railway Station in Cumberland which provides tourist orientation and historical exhibits.

A former WM warehouse is still standing on Hillen Street in downtown Baltimore, next to the Orleans Street Viaduct; it is now occupied by Public Storage, which also owns and operates the building.

== Subdivisions ==
At the peak in the early 20th century, WM operated the following lines:

Subdivision Name	Start	End	Notes	Status
Belington	Elkins, West Virginia	Belington, West Virginia		Currently owned by West Virginia State Rail Authority (WVSRA) and officially named the West Virginia Central Railroad; currently operated by Durbin & Greenbrier Valley Railroad (D&GV)
Connellsville	Cumberland, Maryland	Connellsville, Pennsylvania	Includes State Line Branch (Georges Creek Jct. to State Line, Pennsylvania, connecting to PRR until 1972). Centralized Traffic Control (CTC) at Cumberland.	Portions now Western Maryland Scenic Railroad and Great Allegheny Passage rail trail
Durbin	Elkins, West Virginia	Durbin, West Virginia		Elkins to Cheat Jct. portion now owned by WVSRA and operated by D&GV; Cheat Jct. to Durbin portion owned by Monongahela National Forest and named the West Fork Rail-Trail.
East	Walbrook Junction, Maryland	Hagerstown, Maryland		Section between Emory Grove and Highfield now operated by Maryland Midland Railway; remaining sections operated by CSX.
Greenbrier, Cheat & Elk (GC&E)	Cheat Junction, West Virginia	Webster Springs, West Virginia		Cheat Jct. to Big Cut portion owned by WVSRA and operated by D&GV
Hanover	Emory Grove, Maryland	Highfield-Cascade, Maryland	CTC at Emory Grove Tower	Now operated by CSX Transportation
Huttonsville	Elkins, West Virginia	Dailey, West Virginia		Currently owned by WVSRA. Operator is currently D&GV, but trackage has been idle since c. 2010.
Lurgan	Hagerstown, Maryland	Shippensburg, Pennsylvania		Portions now operated by CSX & Pennsylvania & Southern Railway
Thomas	Cumberland, Maryland	Elkins, West Virginia	Includes C&P Branch from Westernport to Shaft, Maryland; and Stony River Subdivision, opened & leased by WM in 1963 (Bayard, West Virginia to Mount Storm Power Station)	Portions of original GC&C line abandoned 1927; other portions now operated by CSX, Georges Creek Railway (now leased to Western Maryland Scenic Railroad); portions also a rail-trail and abandoned/ submerged under Jennings Randolph Lake.
Tide	Walbrook Junction	Port Covington (Baltimore)		Portions now CSX; Port Covington abandoned 1988.
West	Cumberland, Maryland	Hagerstown, Maryland	CTC at Maryland Jct.	Portion east of Cumberland abandoned by CSX except for small section at North Branch; Western Maryland Rail Trail from Peare to Big Pool; portion east of Big Pool operated by CSX under reorganized Lurgan Sub
York	Porters Sideling, Pennsylvania	York, Pennsylvania		Now operated by York Railway

== Heritage unit ==
In April 2024 CSX Transportation unveiled their 12th heritage unit CSX #1852 Western Maryland.

== See also ==
- Category: Predecessors of the Western Maryland Railway
- List of defunct Maryland railroads
- List of defunct Pennsylvania railroads
- List of defunct West Virginia railroads
- Western Maryland 202
