= Pat Flaherty (American football) =

American football player and coach (born 1956)

Personal information
- Born: April 27, 1956 (age 70); Clarksburg, West Virginia, U.S.

Career information
- High school: Delone Catholic (McSherrystown, Pennsylvania)
- College: East Stroudsburg

Career history
- Delone Catholic HS (PA) (1978–1979) Head coach; East Stroudsburg (1980–1981) Offensive line coach; Penn State (1982–1983) Offensive line assistant; Rutgers (1984–1991) Offensive line assistant; East Carolina (1992) Defensive ends coach; Wake Forest (1993–1998) Offensive line/Tight ends/Special teams coach; Iowa (1999) Tight ends/Special teams coach; Washington Redskins (2000) Tight ends coach; Chicago Bears (2001–2003) Tight ends coach; New York Giants (2004–2015) Offensive line coach; San Francisco 49ers (2016) Offensive line coach; Jacksonville Jaguars (2017–2018) Offensive line coach; Miami Dolphins (2019) Offensive line coach; Penn State (2019–2020) Analyst; New York Giants (2021) Advisor; Rutgers (2023–2025) Offensive line coach

Awards and highlights
- 2× Super Bowl champion (XLII, XLVI)

Pat Flaherty (born April 27, 1956) is an American football coach who is currently the offensive line coach for Rutgers.

== Playing career ==
Flaherty attended East Stroudsburg University and was a student and a letterman in football. In football, he was the starting center and won All-America honors.

== Coaching ==
=== Collegiate ===
Flaherty began his coaching career at his alma mater, Delone Catholic High School in McSherrystown, Pennsylvania from 1978–79. Flaherty moved to the collegiate ranks, coaching the offensive line at his alma mater, East Stroudsburg University, from 1980–81.

He then joined the Penn State coaching staff from 1982 to 1983 as an assistant under offensive line coach Dick Anderson. At Penn State, he helped the Nittany Lions win the 1982 National Championship with a Sugar Bowl victory over Georgia. When Anderson left to become head coach at Rutgers prior to the 1984 season, Flaherty joined him on the Scarlet Knights' staff, where he remained through the 1991 season.

Flaherty spent the 1992 season coaching the defensive line at East Carolina. From 1993–98, he was on the staff at Wake Forest, where he coached the offensive line, tight ends and special teams. In 1999, he coached tight ends and special teams and was in charge of recruiting at the University of Iowa.

=== NFL ===
Flaherty became the tight ends coach of the Washington Redskins under the head coach at the time, Norv Turner, in 2000. However, after just 1 season, Flaherty was relieved of his duties due to Norv Turner being fired midway through the season. In 2004, Flaherty became the offensive line coach of the New York Giants. He was hired to a new staff under new head coach Tom Coughlin, and received two Super Bowl rings during this time. He would remain in this position until 2015 when Tom Coughlin stepped down, thus beginning a coaching staff overhaul. On January 22, 2016, Flaherty was hired by new head coach Chip Kelly to become the offensive line coach of the San Francisco 49ers. On January 14, 2017, Flaherty was hired by new head coach Doug Marrone to become the offensive line coach of the Jacksonville Jaguars. On December 31, 2018, following a disappointing 5-11 campaign, Flaherty was one of three assistant coaches that were fired at the end of the season.

On February 8, 2019, the Miami Dolphins announced they had hired Flaherty as their offensive line coach. On July 29, 2019, the Dolphins head coach, Brian Flores, fired Flaherty just four days into training camp and replaced him with team analyst Dave DeGuglielmo.
