= Delone Catholic High School =

Location
- 140 South Oxford Avenue; McSherrystown, Pennsylvania; McSherrystown, (Adams County), Pennsylvania 17344; United States; 39°48′22″N 77°0′38″W

Information
- Type: Private, co-educational
- Motto: Estote Factores Verbi ("Be Doers of the Word (James 1:22)")
- Religious affiliation: Roman Catholic
- Established: 1940
- Founder: Bishop George L. Leech, Charles J. Delone, Esq.
- Oversight: Roman Catholic Diocese of Harrisburg
- Superintendent: Daniel Breen
- CEEB code: 392520
- Principal: David J. Staub
- Chaplain: Rev. Samuel Miller
- Grades: 9-12
- Colors: School colors: red and blue Athletic colors: black and gold
- Slogan: Prepared to Lead. Prepared to Serve. Prepared for Life.
- Athletics conference: PIAA District 3, YAIAA
- Mascot: Squire
- Accreditation: Middle States Association of Colleges and Schools
- Publication: Insquire (literary magazine)
- Newspaper: Delonews
- Yearbook: Delonian
- Tuition: https://www.delonecatholic.org/apps/pages/tuitionrates
- Communities served: Pennsylvania: Adams County, south western York County Maryland: Carroll County, Frederick County, north western Baltimore County
- Feeder schools: St. Francis Xavier Catholic School (Gettysburg), St. Joseph Catholic School (Hanover), St. Teresa of Calcutta Catholic School (McSherrystown)
- Affiliation: NCEA
- Website: www.delonecatholic.org

Delone Catholic High School is a private, Roman Catholic high school in McSherrystown, Pennsylvania, United States. It is located in the Roman Catholic Diocese of Harrisburg.

== History ==
Delone Catholic High School is a regional high school named for Charles J. Delone, Esquire, a prominent Catholic attorney of Hanover, Pennsylvania, who donated the land and the funds for the construction of the original building. The facilities that had been the education center for the elementary and high school had been destroyed by a fire in 1938, which precipitated Delone's donation. The cornerstone of the new school was laid in 1939, and the new building was dedicated by Archbishop Amleto Giovanni Cicognani, Apostolic Delegate to the United States, on September 2, 1940. As a tribute to Delone, the school bears his name and its athletic teams have adopted his title: "Squires" and "Squirettes".

Father Cyril J. Allwein was appointed the first principal. The Sisters of Saint Joseph were joined on the faculty by the Sisters of Mercy and, in 1941, by the Sisters of Christian Charity.

In 1952, the high school was accredited by the Middle States Association under the direction of Father William R. Lyons, Principal 1948-1977. Two wings were added to the original building in 1955 and 1962. A chapel bearing the title "Our Lady, Queen of Peace" was constructed in 1966. The Lawrence B. (Sonny) Sheppard Memorial, a gymnasium complex, the gift of Mr. and Mrs. L.B. Sheppard in memory of their son, was built in 1968.

Delone Catholic High School serves the youth of parishes in Hanover, McSherrystown, Littlestown, Spring Grove, Abbottstown, New Oxford, Bonneauville, Gettysburg, Fairfield in Pennsylvania; and Westminster, Emmitsburg, Reisterstown, Taneytown and Glyndon in Maryland.

== Freedom Shrine ==
Delone Catholic exhibits one of the first Freedom Shrines, donated by the Hanover Exchange Club and dedicated on March 26, 1957. The shrine displays a variety of documents, including the U.S. Declaration of Independence, the Gettysburg Address and the treaties of World War II. A rededication ceremony was held on September 16, 2009. Joe Dittmar, a survivor of the September 11, 2001, attack on the World Trade Centers, gave the keynote address.

== Sports ==
The girls' basketball team won the Pennsylvania Interscholastic Athletic Association State Championship in 2002-03, 2003–04 and 2004–05, all in PIAA section AA. The team took the 2004 title with a 46-33 win over Bishop Guilfoyle High School in the tournament final. In 2004-05, Delone won the state championship with a 47-43 win against Westmont Hilltop High School at the GIANT Center in Hershey, Pennsylvania.

The boys' basketball team won the 1988-89 Class AA State Championship with a 68-61 win over Brentwood High School.

The men's 2010 Varsity baseball team won the District 3 Championship. The team was coached by Alan Felix and Frank Felix.

Sprinter Maggie Borden was 2001 and 2002 state champion in the 400 meters, and was named Division B Track and Field Player of the Year.

James "Jimmy" Smith won the PCIAA State Wrestling Championship in the unlimited weight class in 1972, before Catholic high schools could compete in PIAA competition. Tom Koontz won the same PCIAA State Title in 1974. His brother, Tony Koontz, won the PIAA Class AA Wrestling State Championship in the unlimited weight class in both 1983 and 1984. Dana Gingrich won the 2003 State Championship in the 130 lb. weight class. In 2010, Tyler Small won the PIAA Class AA Wrestling State Championship in the 125 lb. weight class.

The football team's annual game against the cross-town rival Hanover High School is Pennsylvania's third-longest prep football series. The Squires now have a 43-28-5 lead in the 75-year-old rivalry with Delone taking 24 of the last 30 meetings.

Delone Catholic's 2009 track and field team was the first track team to win a District Championship. They received the trophy on May 16, 2009.

In 2009, Andrea Staub placed second and third at the PIAA Swimming Championships. She is Delone Catholic's first D1 swimmer to sign with Louisiana State University.

== Notable alumni ==
- John Dopson, former Major League Baseball pitcher
- Casey Lawrence, Major League Baseball pitcher
