= Beery =

Beery is a surname. Notable people with the surname include:

- Adaline Hohf Beery (1859–1929), American author, newspaper editor, songbook compiler, hymnwriter
- Dan Beery (born 1975), American competition rower, Olympic champion and world champion
- Janet Beery, American mathematician and historian of mathematics
- Noah Beery (1882–1946), American actor
- Noah Beery Jr. (1913–1994), American actor
- Wallace Beery (1885–1949), American actor
