= John Hostetter =

American actor

- Born: October 6, 1946; Brooklyn, New York, U.S.
- Died: September 2, 2016 (aged 69); Port Orange, Florida, U.S.
- Occupations: Actor; visual artist
- Years active: 1971–2006
- Spouse: Del Louise Appleby (m. 1981)
- Website: www.johnhostetter.com

John Hostetter (October 6, 1946 – September 2, 2016) was an American actor and visual artist. He played John, the stage manager on the fictional FYI newsmagazine, on the CBS sitcom Murphy Brown starring Candice Bergen; he appeared in 65 of the series's 247 episodes from 1988 to 1998.

== Early life ==
Hostetter was born in Brooklyn, New York, on October 6, 1946. He was raised in Hanover, Pennsylvania, and graduated from Eichelberger High School. He attended both Catawba College and the University of North Carolina at Charlotte before completing his master's degree in acting at Cornell University. Following college, Hostetter joined the National Shakespeare Company before relocating to California in 1971 to pursue acting. In 1971, he co-starred with Christopher Reeve in a stage production of Samuel Beckett's play, Waiting for Godot.

== Career ==
He appeared in more than 100 film and television roles throughout his professional career. His televisions credits from the 1970s to 2000s include: Cagney & Lacey, Coach, The Golden Girls, Knight Rider, Matlock, Simon & Simon, NYPD Blue, JAG, Sheena, and T. J. Hooker. His films included Into the Night (1985), Heartbreak Ridge (1986), Beverly Hills Cop II (1987), No Way Out (1987), Leonard Part 6 (1987), and Star Trek: Insurrection (1998).

In 1985, Hostetter was cast as the voice of Bazooka on the popular animated series, G.I. Joe: A Real American Hero, which launched his voice acting career. He reprised his role of Bazooka in the spin-off film, G.I. Joe: The Movie, which was released on VHS in 1987. A decade later, Hostetter provided English-language voices for Hayao Miyazaki's anime feature, Princess Mononoke, released in 1997. His voice credits also included video games, including Vampire Hunter D in 1999.

== Personal life ==
In 2001, Hostetter and his wife, Del, moved to Florida where he worked as a visual artist.

== Death ==
Hostetter died after a long battle with cancer in Port Orange, Florida, on September 2, 2016, aged 69, a month shy of his 70th birthday. He was cremated and his ashes were sprinkled into the Atlantic Ocean.

== Filmography ==
=== Film ===
| Year | Title | Role | Notes |
|---|---|---|---|
| 1979 | The In-Laws | Workman | |
| 1980 | Heart Beat | Poet | |
| 1981 | Knightriders | Tuck | |
| 1982 | Aladdin and the Magic Lamp | The Genie of the Lamp, Street Urchin | English Version, Voice |
| 1984 | Katy Caterpillar | Ferdinand Q. Frog, Chameleon B, Bee A | English Version, Voice |
| 1984 | Best Defense | Quirk, Dynatechincs | |
| 1985 | Into the Night | Aerospace Engineer | |
| 1986 | A Winner Never Quits | Sergeant | TV movie |
| 1986 | Castle in the Sky | Boss | Disney English Version, Voice |
| 1986 | Heartbreak Ridge | Officer Reese | |
| 1987 | The Betty Ford Story | News Director | TV movie |
| 1987 | The Stepford Children | Swimming Instructor | TV movie |
| 1987 | G.I. Joe: The Movie | Bazooka | Voice, Video |
| 1987 | Beverly Hills Cop II | Stiles | |
| 1987 | Aria | Elvis Impersonator | (segment "Rigoletto") |
| 1987 | No Way Out | C.I.D. Man | |
| 1987 | Leonard Part 6 | Adams | |
| 1989 | Kiki's Delivery Service | Fukuo, Dirigible Captain | Disney English Version, Voice |
| 1991 | The People Under The Stairs | Veteran Cop | |
| 1992 | Class Act | Football Coach | |
| 1993 | Wilder Napalm | Matt, Singing Firemen | |
| 1994 | Every Breath | Man #2 | |
| 1994 | Love Affair | Ben | |
| 1996 | Our Son, the Matchmaker | John Adams | TV movie |
| 1996 | Black Mask | | Voice |
| 1997 | Princess Mononoke | | English Version, Voice |
| 1997 | Twilight of the Dark Master | Police Inspector Kumazawa | English Version, Voice |
| 1998 | Star Trek: Insurrection | Bolian Officer | |
| 2000 | Time Share | Sam | TV movie |
| 2000 | Vampire Hunter D: Bloodlust | Polk | Voice |
| 2001 | Murder, She Wrote: The Last Free Man | Cornelius Ashland | TV movie |
| 2002 | Kermit's Swamp Years | Hugo Krassman | Direct-to-Video |
| 2006 | The Hawk Is Dying | Nebbish Professor | (final film role) |

=== Television ===
| Year | Title | Role | Notes |
|---|---|---|---|
| 1982 | CHiPs | Manager | Episode: "Silent Partner" |
| 1982 | Knight Rider | Police Officer | Episode: "Trust Doesn't Rust" |
| 1983 | Scarecrow and Mrs. King | IFF Agent / IFF Agent Jack | 2 episodes |
| 1984 | Hotel | Department of Justice Agent | Episode: "Passages" |
| 1984 | Bay City Blues | Rod Baker | Episode: "Rocky IV-Eyes" |
| 1983-84 | Hardcastle and McCormick | Police Officer Brimson / Godfrey | 2 episodes |
| 1984 | The New Mike Hammer | Jenkins | Episode: "Cold Target" |
| 1984 | T.J. Hooker | Bus Driver | Episode: "Grand Theft Auto" |
| 1985 | Simon & Simon | Police Sgt. | Episode: "Enter the Jaguar" |
| 1985 | A Death in California | | 1 episode |
| 1985 | Hill Street Blues | Nizer | Episode: "In the Belly of the Bus" |
| 1985 | The Golden Girls | The Policeman | Episode: "On Golden Girls" |
| 1985 | G.I. Joe: A Real American Hero | Bazooka (voice) | 16 episodes |
| 1985 | Hell Town | Chooluck | Episode: "A Wedding in Hell Town" |
| 1985 | Santa Barbara | Mechanic George | 1 episode |
| 1985 | Moonlighting | Jim King | Episode: "'Twas the Episode Before Christmas" |
| 1986 | Remington Steele | Minister | Episode: "Bonds of Steele" |
| 1986 | The Transformers | Ramhorn (voice) | 4 episodes |
| 1985-86 | Hunter | Passenger / Bartender | 2 episodes |
| 1984–87 | Family Ties | Stage Manager / The Heckler | 2 episodes |
| 1983–87 | Dallas | Paul Derber | 2 episodes |
| 1987 | Newhart | Mr. Flutterman | Episode: "Support Your Local Shifflet" |
| 1988 | Frank's Place | The Haystackers | Episode: "Night Business" |
| 1986–88 | Walt Disney's Wonderful World of Color | Johnny / Mr. Harmon | 2 episodes |
| 1988 | Cagney & Lacey | Stan Wodjeski | Episode: "Land of the Free" |
| 1988 | Beverly Hills Buntz | Delivery Man | Episode: "Buntz of the Desert" |
| 1988 | Falcon Crest | Agent Rand | Episode: "Tuscany Venus" |
| 1989 | Coach | Man | Episode: "Gambling for Meat" |
| 1989 | Quantum Leap | Burt | Episode: "Double Identity - November 8, 1965" |
| 1989 | Gideon Oliver | Paul Lighter | Episode: "By the Rivers of Babylon" |
| 1989 | L.A. Law | William Forester | Episode: "Captain Hurt" |
| 1987–90 | Matlock | Whitehall / Engineer | 3 episodes |
| 1990 | Nasty Boys | Detective Fasano | Episode: "Home Again" |
| 1990 | Equal Justice | Bartender | Episode: "Cop's Story" |
| 1990 | Parenthood | | Episode: "Pilot" |
| 1990 | The Trials of Rosie O'Neill | Officer Shaheen | Episode: "Late Night Callers" |
| 1990 | Jake and the Fatman | Bruno | Episode: "I Know That You Know" |
| 1990 | Father Dowling Mysteries | Wilson | Episode: "The Christmas Mystery" |
| 1991 | The Flash | Mills | Episode: "Be My Baby" |
| 1988–91 | Who's the Boss? | Satch | 2 episodes |
| 1991 | Top of the Heap | Newscaster | Episode: "Stocks and Bondages" |
| 1991 | MacGyver | Sgt. Rudley | 2 episodes |
| 1985-91 | Knots Landing | Chief of Detectives / Officer Zellitch | 2 episodes |
| 1991 | The New Lassie | Policeman | Episode: "Dog Day Afternoon" |
| 1992 | Dark Justice | Max Curran | Episode: "Jailbait" |
| 1993 | FBI: The Untold Stories | | Episode: "Dapper Dew" |
| 1993 | NYPD Blue | Chef | Episode: "Brown Appetit" |
| 1994 | Tekkaman Blade II | Honda (voice) | 4 episodes |
| 1997 | Suddenly Susan | Stage Manager | Episode: "The Ways and Means" |
| 1997 | Spicy City | Jake (voice) | 2 episodes |
| 1988–97 | Murphy Brown | John | 65 episodes |
| 1998 | Beyond Belief: Fact or Fiction | | Episode: "The Wall / The Chalkboard / The Getaway / The Prescription / Summer Camp" |
| 1998 | ER | The Younger Mr. Newton | Episode: "Shades of Gray" |
| 1998 | From the Earth to the Moon | Ralph Cooper | Episode: "We Interrupt This Program" |
| 1998 | JAG | Mike Brookhurst | Episode: "The Martin Baker Fan Club" |
| 1999 | Wasteland | Professor | Episode: "Indian Summer" |
| 1999 | Spawn | Additional voices | 6 episodes |
| 2000 | 7th Heaven | Horserider | Episode: "Say A Little Prayer for Me" |
| 2000 | Arli$$ | | Episode: "The Sum of the Parts" |
| 2002 | Sheena | Col. Quentin Massey | Episode: "Maltaka Flies" |

== Discography ==
John Hostetter can be heard on lead vocals and harmonica on a song by Bruno Blum titled "Bruno Blum Bruno Blum Bruno Blum", which was recorded in Los Angeles in August 1996.
