= George Nace (Neas) House =

Historic house in Pennsylvania, United States

- U.S. National Register of Historic Places
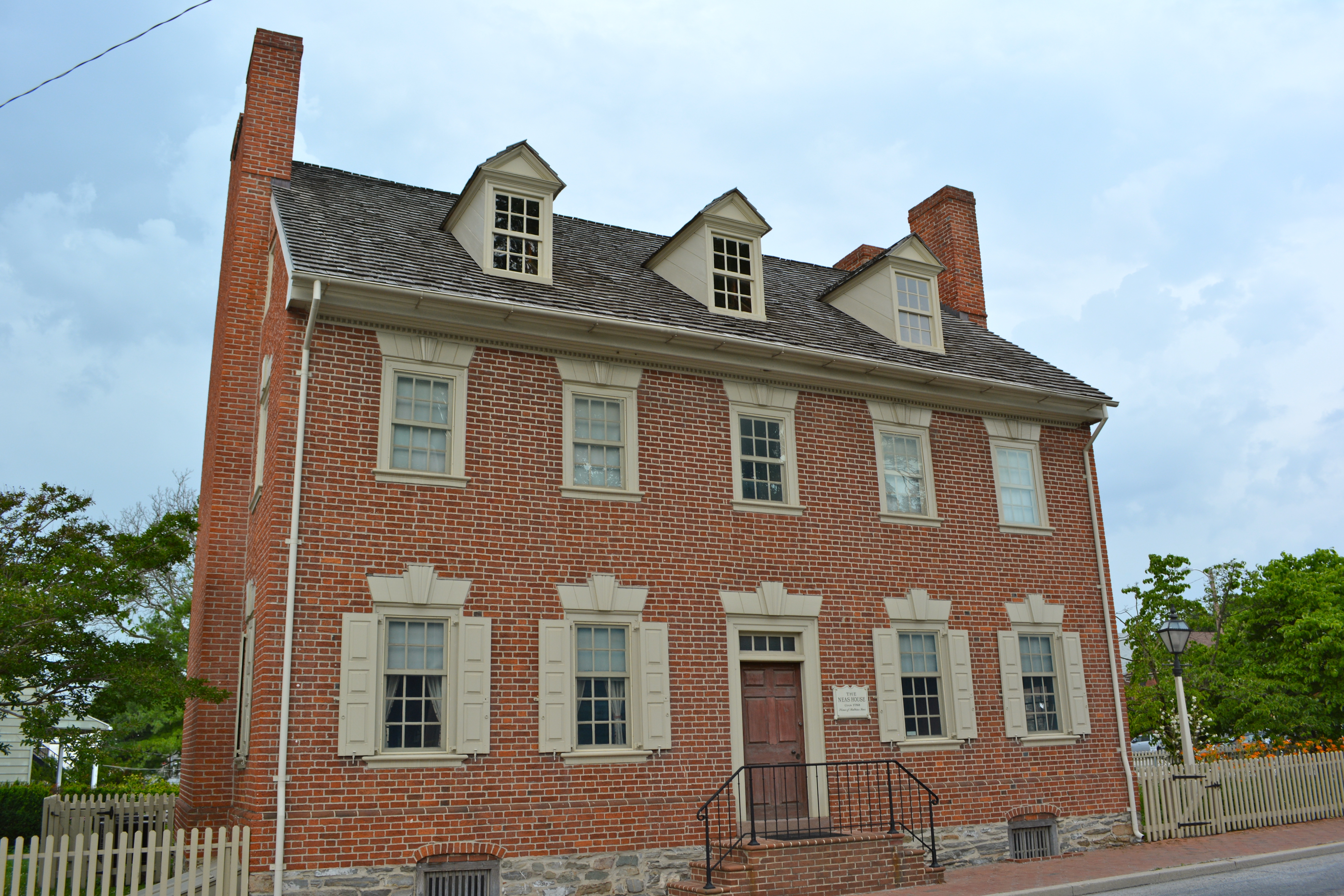

- Location within Pennsylvania Location within the United States
- Location: 113-115 W. Chestnut St., Hanover, Pennsylvania
- Coordinates: 39°48′3″N 76°59′10″W
- Area: 0.3 acres (0.12 ha)
- Built: c. 1795
- Architectural style: Federal
- NRHP reference No.: 72001181
- Added to NRHP: April 26, 1972

The George Nace (Neas) House, also known as Neas House, is a historic home located at High and West Chestnut Streets in the historic district of the Borough of Hanover in York County, Pennsylvania.

Built circa 1783 by Mathias Neas, it was added to the National Register of Historic Places in 1972.

== History ==
The George Nace (Neas) House, which is located in the Hanover Historic District in the Borough of Hanover, Pennsylvania, was built circa 1783 by tanner Mathias Nace (Neas), who had acquired six lots of land during the prior year from his brother, George Nace (Neas). The home and land were subsequently acquired by George Nace (Neas), Jr., who served as Hanover's third postmaster between 1790 and 1813 prior to becoming the town's first burgess in 1815, as well as a member of the Pennsylvania House of Representatives. Residing with him at the home were his wife Catharine (Slagle) Nace (Neas) and her daughter, Amanda, who later married Mathias Nace Forney, one of the founders of the Hanover Savings Fund Society (which later became the Bank of Hanover).

Purchased and restored in 1974 by the Hanover Area Historical Society, it now serves as the society's headquarters and as a museum. It was added to the National Register of Historic Places in 1972.

== Architectural features and exhibits ==
This historic property is a 2 1/2-story, brick, Georgian-style dwelling, which was erected on a rubble fieldstone foundation. It features double chimneys and a steep gable roof, and has Federal-style details.

In addition, the residence contains nine rooms, nine fireplaces and an exposed timber warming kitchen. Period furniture and personal items which were owned by the initial residents of the property are available for viewing as part of the museum's permanent collections. Among the more prominent of the items preserved here is the American flag which flew over the building of the American Spectator newspaper office on Frederick Street in Hanover during the American Civil War. It was saved from destruction by Confederate States Army troops by a group of Pennsylvanians and New Yorkers during the Battle of Hanover, which took place on June 30, 1863, as the final engagement between Union and Confederate forces prior to July's Battle of Gettysburg.

Also housed at Neas House is the Yelland Library, which includes roughly 800 books, antiques and other artifacts pertaining to the region's history. The library, which is open to the public on Friday mornings, is made available to researchers by appointment on Mondays through Saturdays.

== Hours of operation ==
Tours of this historic residence are available on Saturdays between noon and 3:00 p.m. from April through October of each year; the home is closed during the winter months. The cost typically ranges between $10 and $15 per person.

The collections of the Yelland Library, which are also housed at Neas House, are available to the general public between 9:00 a.m. and noon on Fridays, or via appointment Mondays through Saturdays.

== See also ==
- Eichelberger High School, Hanover, Pennsylvania
- Hanover Historic District, Hanover, Pennsylvania
- United States Post Office (Hanover, Pennsylvania)

== Gallery ==
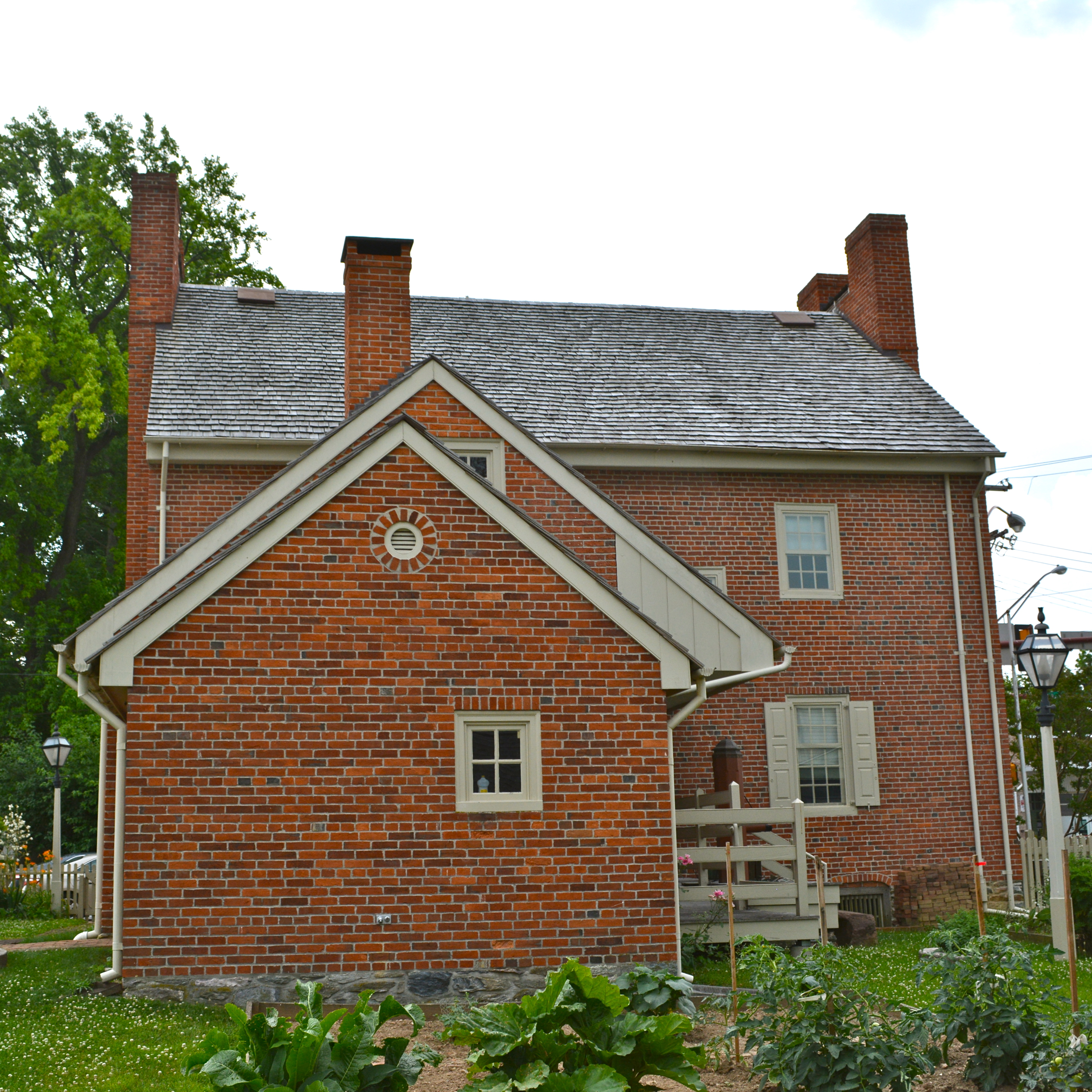

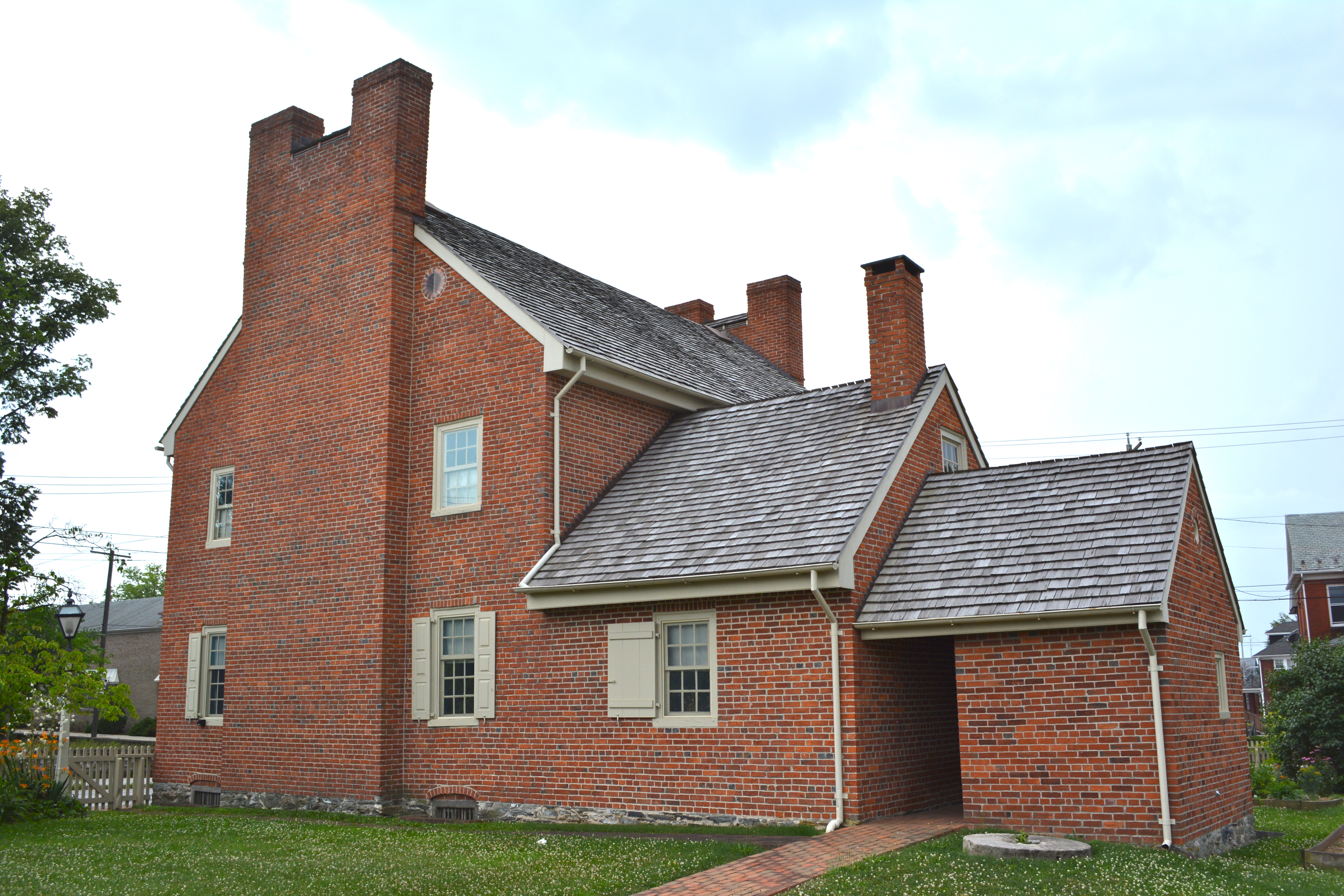

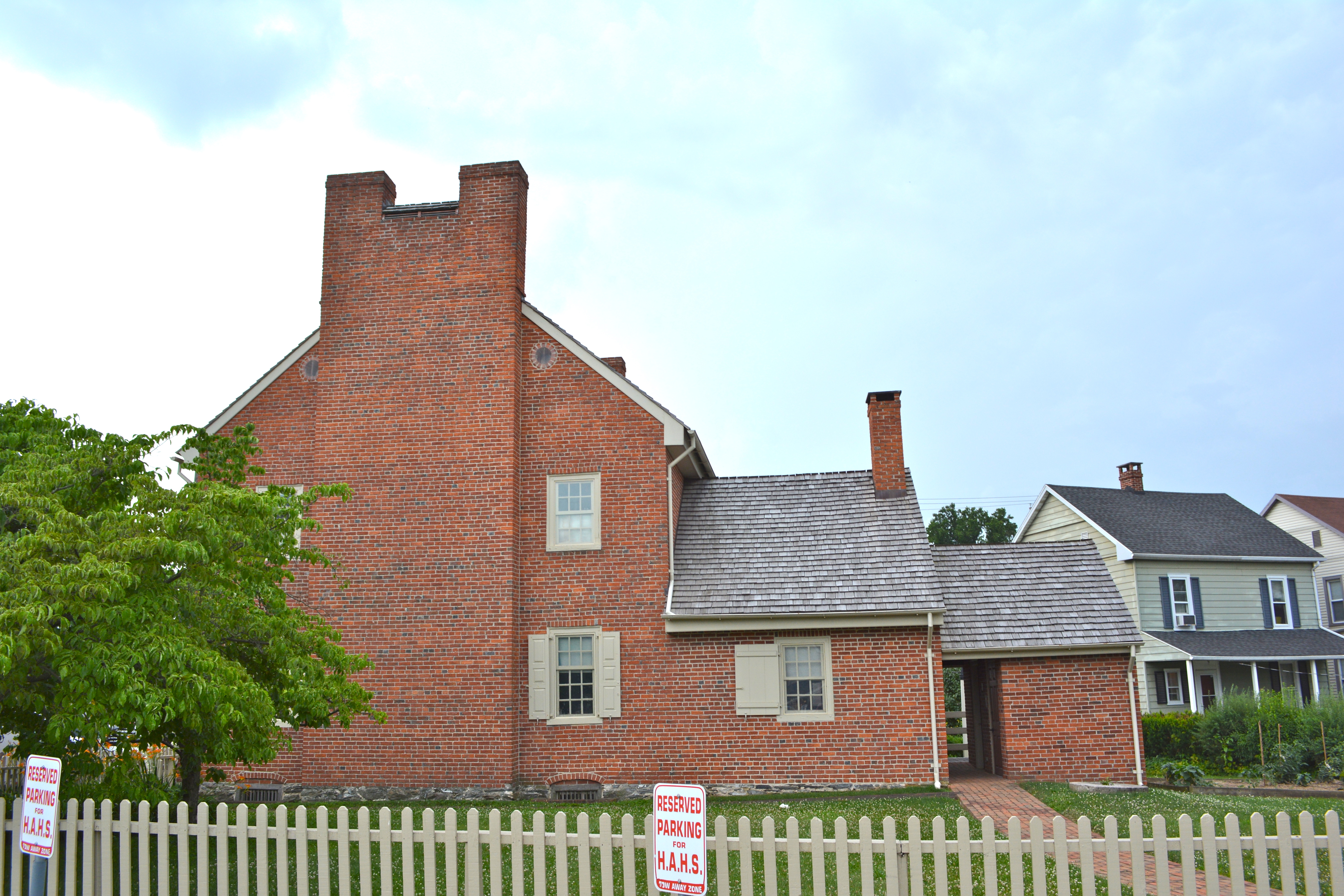
