= Menchey Music Service =

American musical instrument retailer

Menchey Music Service, Inc.
- Type: Private corporation
- Predecessor: Stu's Music Shop in Westminster, Maryland
- Founded: 1936 in Hanover, Pennsylvania
- Founder: J. Robert Menchey
- Headquarters: Hanover, Pennsylvania, United States
- Number of locations: 8 stores
- Areas served: Pennsylvania and Maryland
- Products: Musical instruments
- Brands: Yamaha
- Services: Music lessons; Musical instrument repair; Piano tuning
- Owner: Joel Menchey
- Number of employees: 200
- Website: www.mencheymusic.com

Menchey Music Service, Inc. is a family-owned chain of eight musical instrument stores in Pennsylvania and Maryland. From its store locations and through direct arrangements with schools, Menchey Music sells and rents musical instruments and accessories, offers music lessons, and provides musical instrument repair.

== Locations ==
Menchey Music has seven store locations. Its headquarters and flagship store are in Hanover, Pennsylvania. Menchey Music also has stores in York, Harrisburg, Lancaster, and Reading, Pennsylvania, and in Gambrills, Timonium, and Westminster, Maryland.The Hanover headquarters location has been the main location for all purchasing, MIS, e-commerce, mail order printed music, accounting, instrument repair, and instrument rental activity since 1987. The business also maintains relationships with rental affiliates throughout Pennsylvania and Maryland. Most of its affiliates are independently owned music dealers who rent Menchey Orchestral and Band instruments. Menchey Music offers opportunities to become a rental affiliate dealer or an affiliate school. Each Menchey Music store location provides lesson studios along with small waiting rooms for those who are early for lessons. The Hanover and York County business has eight studios with over 10 music instructors who are certified music educators. The number of instructors per location changes based on the demand from their customers.

== Products and services ==
Menchey Music sells and rents guitars, pianos, and band and orchestra instruments, including string, brass, percussion, and keyboard instruments, as well as printed sheet music. In addition to serving consumers directly, Menchey Music has formal arrangements with school districts and colleges to visit schools weekly to pick up and return instruments that need to be repaired or replaced. Their repairs are not limited to instruments specifically purchased at Menchey. School rentals is its largest source of revenue.

The company makes relationships with local school districts by providing rental instruments. Schools across the country participate in rental programs for students in band or orchestras. Menchey Music provides their rental service with pickups and deliveries directly to the school. Music stores tend to succeed with school instrument rentals because parents don't want to pay full price for an instrument their child may not continue with. Menchey Music also gives the opportunity for students to rent their instruments through schools so they can change and experiment with instruments they like, without making a long-term commitment. With rent-to-own options, children have the ability to keep their instrument when the payment is complete.

Musical instrument and voice lessons offered at store locations are provided by independent contractors. The number of teachers at each location vary and depends on the demand of their customers. Lessons consist of a typical half-hour block once a week, signing up for month long sessions at a time.

Band and orchestra instrument brands sold by Menchey Music include Gemeinhardt, Buffet Crampon, Yamaha, Accent Musical Instruments, Eastman Music Company, Vincent Bach, Jupiter Band Instruments, Cannonball Musical Instruments, Haynes, Conn-Selmer, King Musical Instruments, and Henri Selmer Paris. Guitar and amplifier brands include Fender Musical Instruments, Alvarez Guitars, C. F. Martin & Company, Line 6, Zoom, Audio-Technica, Ibanez, and Jay Turser.

=== Awards ===
Menchey is an authorized seller of Yamaha pianos and in 2010 and 2014 was recognized with Yamaha Corporation's Institutional Dealer of the Year Award. Yamaha Corporation of America is the world's largest musical instrument manufacturer. The award was presented to Menchey Music at the NAMM music products show in 2015 in Anaheim, California. This award was presented to only nine music retailers in the country. Yamaha pianos sold by Menchey Music include Yamaha Clavinova digital pianos and Disklavier electronic player pianos.

== History ==
Menchey Music was founded in Hanover, Pennsylvania in 1936 by J. Robert Menchey and today is run by his grandson, Joel Menchey. Robert Menchey (born 1916) founded Menchey Music Service out of his mother's sewing room in Hanover, moved to a small shop on York Street, and eventually settled in a 17,500 square foot superstore on Wetzel Drive in Hanover. When Robert Menchey retired in 1982, his business had grown into a full-service piano and school music dealer in Central Pennsylvania and Maryland. Through the help of a mentor and friend, Orin Sepp, Robert Menchey became one of the pioneers in the successful band instrument rental program. His mentor Sepp was a salesman and executive with the Chicago Musical Instrument Company who wanted to see Menchey do well. The rental program Bob Menchey implemented is now one of the largest sources of revenue for Menchey Music Service. This program started with a simple idea from Bob Menchey, who only wanted to rent instruments to kids so parents didn't have to pay full price for a hobby their child might not keep. Robert Menchey's retail outlets, repair services, and music lessons continue to grow and remain successful.

Menchey Music opened its sixth location (in Reading, Pennsylvania) in August 2012 and its seventh location in July 2013 after purchasing Stu's Music Shop in Westminster, Maryland.

Joel Menchey served on the NAMM Board of Directors from 2007 to 2010, and was re-elected as secretary of the executive board in 2016.
