= Emelie C. S. Chilton =

Emelie C. S. Chilton (1838–1864) was a 19th-century American author of poetry and short stories from Illinois. After completing her education at Rock River Seminary, she became a regular contributor to journals and periodicals in Nashville, Tennessee. She also served as the editor of The Temperance Monthly, a temperance periodical to which she contributed most of her work. Despite her brief life, she was a prolific writer whose talents were recognized early in her childhood.

== Early life and education ==
Emelie C. Swan was born at Lost Mound, Illinois, April 25, 1838. Her parents were Andrew Cavet Swan (1802–1867) and Angelina (Mitchell) Swan (1818–1843). After the mother's death, Emelie lived with her father at Galena, Illinois during the first years of her school life.

Subsequently, she entered Rock River Seminary (later named, Mount Morris College), located at Mount Morris, Illinois, where she completed a regular course of study.

== Career ==
Chilton gave early indications of poetic talent. One of her best poems was written when she was a child, attending the grammar school at Galena. Since she became a resident of Nashville, she was a regular contributor to several of the journals and periodicals of that city and elsewhere.

In May, 1859, she assumed the editorial control of The Temperance Monthly, a 32-page monthly, established in McMinnville, Tennessee, in January 1858, and moved to Nashville in April 1859. Chilton continued as its editor in Nashville, assisted by Mr. R. M. Webber. E. L. Winham was proprietor and publisher. The subtitle of Literary Journal was added in 1860. Its publication ended in August of that year for lack of patronage. Since her connection with that periodical, most of her productions appeared in its columns.

== Personal life ==
While visiting relatives in Nashville, Tennessee, she met and afterward married James A. Chilton. They had a daughter, Alberta.

Emelie Chilton died of consumption in Nashville, March 3, 1864, aged 26 years.

== Selected works ==
- "All Things Considered" (short story)
- "October" (poem)
- "The Wrens in the Locust-Tree"
