= Hanover Public School District =

School district in Pennsylvania

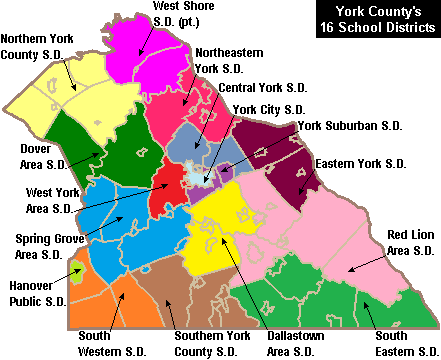

Address
- 403 Moul Avenue Hanover, York County, Pennsylvania, 17331-1541; United States

District information
- Grades: K-12

Other information
- Website: www.hpsd.k12.pa.us

Hanover Public School District is a small, urban, public school district located in York County in the borough of Hanover, Pennsylvania. The District encompasses approximately 4 square miles (10 km^{2}). According to 2000 federal census data, Hanover Public School District served a resident population of 14,535. In 2010, the United States Census Bureau reported the District's population had increased to 15,307 people. The educational attainment levels for the Hanover Public School District population (25 years old and over) were 84.8% high school graduates and 16.5% college graduates.

According to the Pennsylvania Budget and Policy Center, 66.9% of the District's pupils lived at 185% or below the federal poverty level as shown by their eligibility for the federal free or reduced price school meal programs in 2012. In 2009, the Hanover Public School District residents’ per capita income was $20,516, while the median family income was $45,156. In the Commonwealth, the median family income was $49,501 and the United States median family income was $49,445, in 2010. In York County, the median household income was $57,494. By 2013, the median household income in the United States rose to $52,100.

Hanover Public School District operates five schools:

- Hanover High School (Pennsylvania)
- Hanover Middle School
- Washington Elementary School
- Hanover Street Elementary School
- Clearview Elementary School

High school students may choose to attend York County School of Technology for training in computer services, culinary arts, cosmetology, architectural design and the construction and mechanical trades. The Lincoln Intermediate Unit IU12 provides the District with a wide variety of services like specialized education for disabled students and hearing, speech and visual disability services and professional development for staff and faculty.

== Extracurriculars ==
Hanover Public School District's students have access to a variety of clubs, activities and an extensive sports program.

=== Sports ===
The District funds:

Boys

- Baseball – AA
- Basketball- AA
- Football – AA
- Golf – AA
- Soccer – A
- Tennis – AA
- Track and Field – AA
- Wrestling – AA

Girls

- Basketball – AA
- Field Hockey – AA
- Soccer (Fall) – A
- Softball – AA
- Girls' Tennis – AA
- Track and Field – AA
- Volleyball – AA

Middle School Sports

Boys

- Basketball
- Cross Country
- Football
- Soccer
- Track and Field
- Wrestling

Girls

- Basketball
- Cross Country
- Field Hockey
- Soccer
- Track and Field
- Volleyball

According to PIAA directory July 2012
