= Hanover Historic District =

Historic district in Pennsylvania, United States

- U.S. National Register of Historic Places
- U.S. Historic district
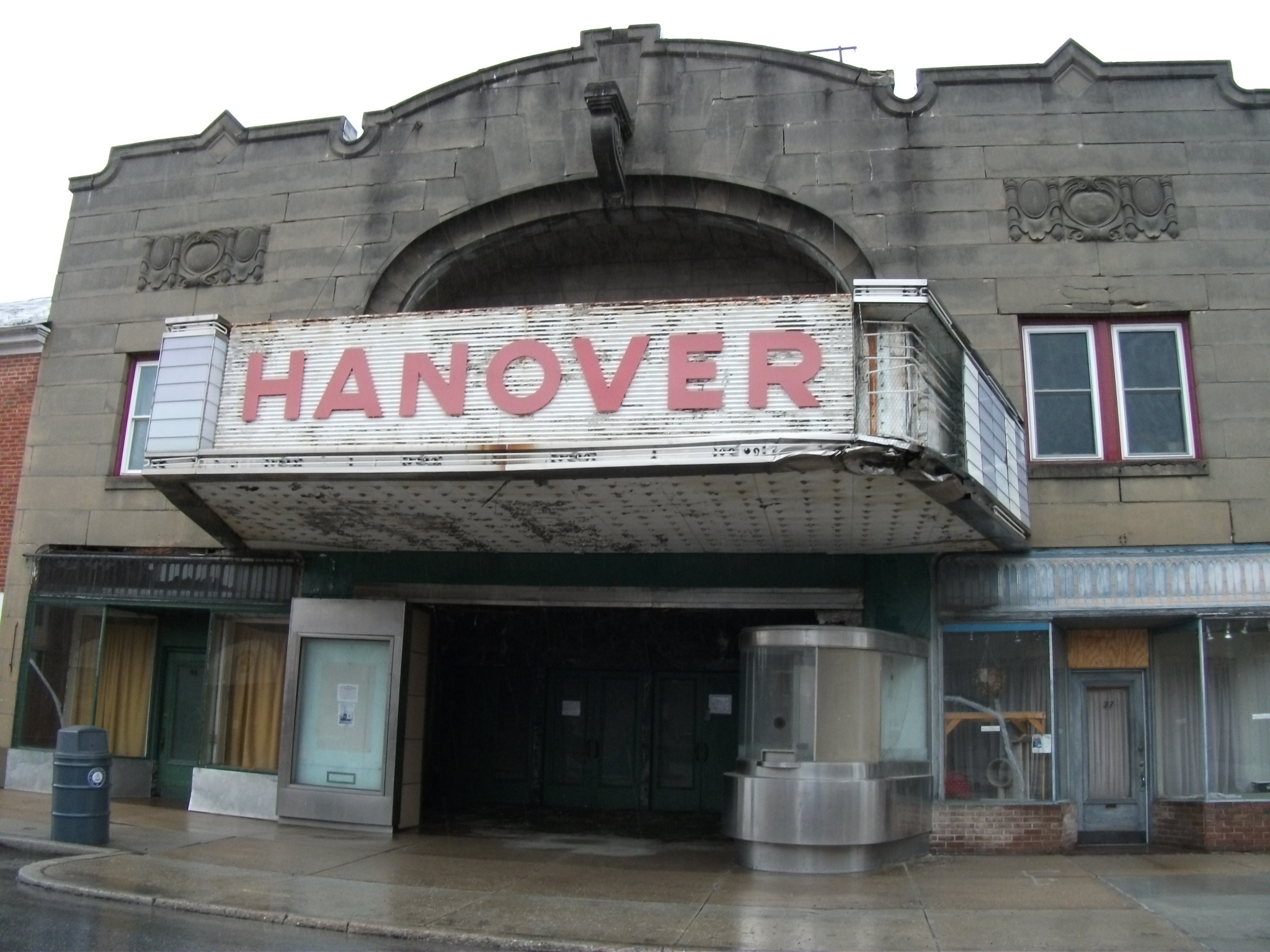
- Hanover Theater, March 2011

- Location within Pennsylvania Location within the United States
- Location: Roughly bounded by Elm Ave., Broadway, Eisenhower Dr., Hollywood Ave., and Hanover borough boundary line, Hanover, Pennsylvania
- Coordinates: 39°48′23″N 76°58′58″W
- Area: 885 acres (358 ha)
- Built: 1852
- Architect: John A. Dempwolf; Reinhardt Dempwolf
- Architectural style: Colonial Revival, Queen Anne, PA German vernacular
- NRHP reference No.: 96001552
- Added to NRHP: January 2, 1997

The Hanover Historic District is a national historic district located in Hanover in York County, Pennsylvania. Bordered roughly by Elm Avenue, Broadway, Eisenhower Drive, Hollywood Avenue, and the borough's boundary line, this district encompasses 2,632 contributing buildings, four contributing sites, three contributing structures, and one contributing object (The Picket) in the central business district and surrounding residential area of Hanover.

It was listed on the National Register of Historic Places in 1997.

== History ==
The community of Hanover, Pennsylvania had its beginnings in a grant of 10,000 acres (40 km^{2}) of land by Charles Calvert, the fourth Lord Baltimore to the Irish nobleman and Maryland resident John Digges in 1727. Named Digges Choice at the time, the name was changed to the Conewago Settlement in 1730 when Catholic settlers from Pennsylvania and Maryland began relocating there in increasing numbers.

Richard McAllister then purchased, in 1745, the specific area of heavily forested land where the original town of Hanover would later be built. After clearing a portion of the land, he erected a log home, store and tavern at what would eventually become the corner of Baltimore and Middle Streets. He then officially founded the town of Hanover in 1763. The town's name was reportedly suggested by Hannover, Germany native Michael Tanner, a commissioner who had helped plan York County's configuration in 1749.

While en route between his home in Monticello, Virginia to Philadelphia to participate in the first session of the Continental Congress where he would, in short order, draft the Declaration of Independence, Thomas Jefferson stopped on April 12, 1776 in Hanover, where he spent the evening at the Sign of the Horse inn on Frederick Street which was owned by Caspar Reinecker. Jefferson then also spent the evening there on September 5, 1776, while en route on his return home. At this time, the town had roughly 500 primarily log-style residences.

This community also played a role in the War of 1812, enrolling two infantry companies which helped halt the advance of British troops on Baltimore in 1814 during and after the Battle of North Point.

In 1852, further growth of the community was facilitated by construction of the Hanover Branch Railroad to Hanover Junction, Pennsylvania, followed by the 1858 opening of the Gettysburg Railroad, which extended travel capabilities west toward Gettysburg. The Hanover and York Railroad then extended travel even further by opening a link to York in 1876.

On June 30, 1863, Hanover became the site of the final encounter between the Union and Confederate States armies before they fought against each other in July's three-day Battle of Gettysburg during the American Civil War.

=== Establishment of this historic district ===
According to the staff of the Pennsylvania Historical and Museum Commission who assisted with the preparation of the nomination form to secure placement of the Hanover Historic District on the National Register of Historic Places, the district encompasses roughly 885 acres. "Five major thoroughfares (Baltimore Street, Broadway, Carlisle Street, Frederick Street and York Street) intersect in the heart of the Historic District, a configuration that has been in place since the town's inception." This district's boundaries "were selected in order to encompass the oldest portion of the town containing the highest number of contributing architectural resources," according to borough staff.

This historic district was listed on the National Register of Historic Places in 1997.

== Notable architecture ==
Most of the buildings in the Hanover Historic District date between 1870 and 1946, with some notable Colonial Revival, Queen Anne, and Pennsylvania German vernacular style frame and brick buildings. Notable contributing buildings include the Forney House (1905), Evangelical Brethren Church Rectory (c. 1930), Hanover Shoe Store (c. 1930), Sheppard and Myers Building (c. 1890), McCalister Inn (c. 1925), Peoples Bank building (1901), Hanover Broad Silk Works (c. 1910), Myers and Sheppard Residence (1912-1913), Emmanuel United Church of Christ (1899), Union Station (1892), Bank of Hanover (1906), and Hanover Public Library (1910). The contributing structures are two natural gas pumping stations (c. 1940) and a railroad freight car (1922). Located in the district and separately listed are the Eichelberger High School, George Nace (Neas) House (c. 1783), and U.S. Post Office.
