= United States Post Office (Hanover, Pennsylvania) =

- United States Post Office-Hanover
- U.S. National Register of Historic Places
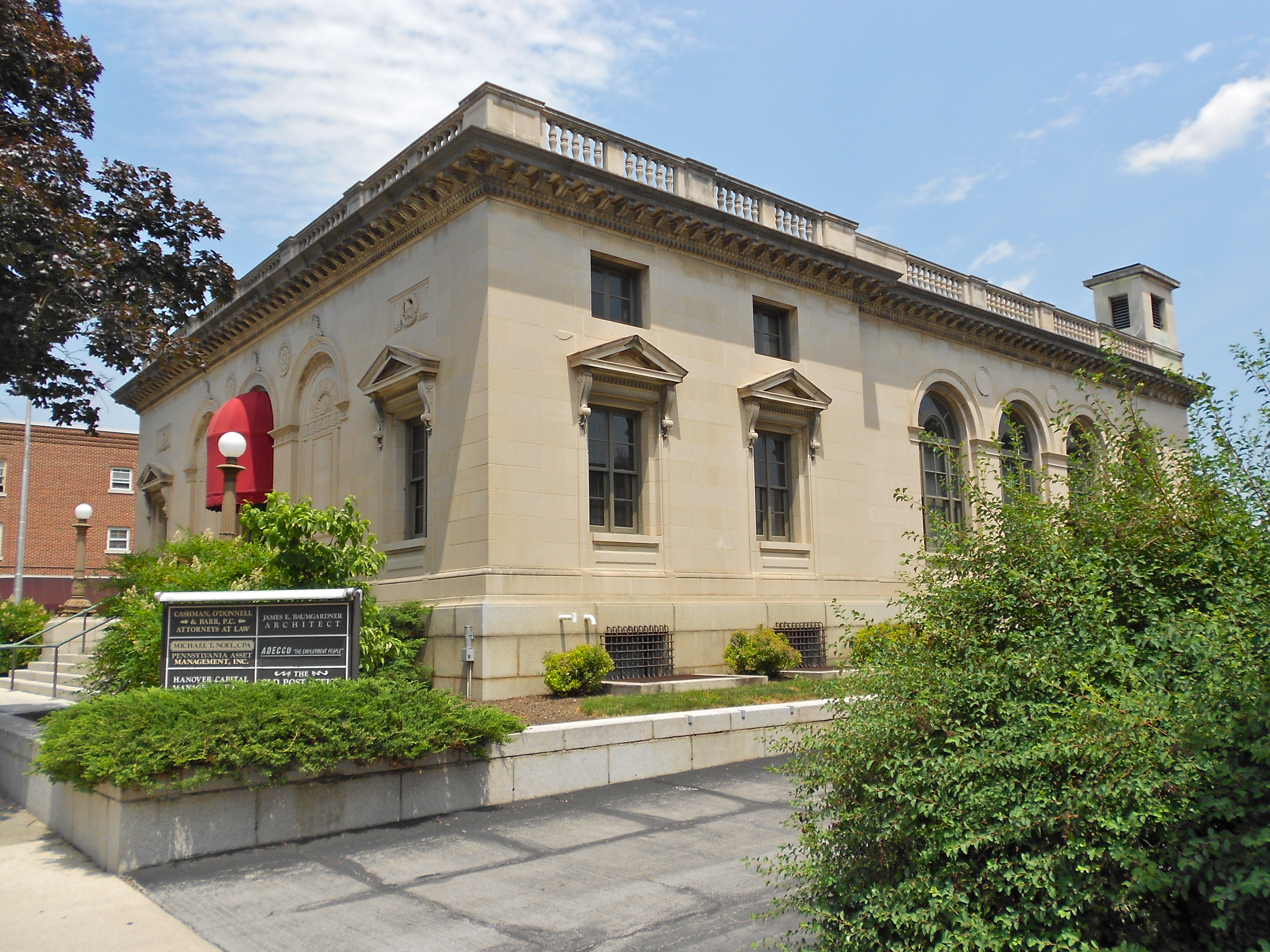
- The Post Office in 2013

- Location within Pennsylvania Location within the United States
- Location: 141 Broadway, Hanover, Pennsylvania
- Coordinates: 39°48′7″N 76°58′56″W
- Area: 0.6 acres (0.24 ha)
- Built: 1911–1913
- Architect: James Knox Taylor
- Architectural style: Renaissance, Italian Renaissance
- NRHP reference No.: 92001719
- Added to NRHP: December 24, 1992

The United States Post Office-Hanover is an historic post office building in Hanover, York County, Pennsylvania, United States.

Added to the National Register of Historic Places in 1992, it is located in the Hanover Historic District.

== History and architectural features ==
Designed by Office of the Supervising Architect James Knox Taylor in 1910 and built between 1911 and 1913, this historic structure is a sandstone building that was created in the Renaissance Revival style. It consists of a five-bay by two-bay front section with a low hipped roof, and a four bay rear extension. The front facade features a trio of arches flanked by rectangular windows at either end. The post office closed in 1969, after which the building was occupied by a clothing store("Trone & Weikert") until being renovated for offices in 1991.
