= Heidelberg Township, York County, Pennsylvania =

Township in Pennsylvania, US

Coordinates: 39°50′00″N 76°54′59″W

- Township
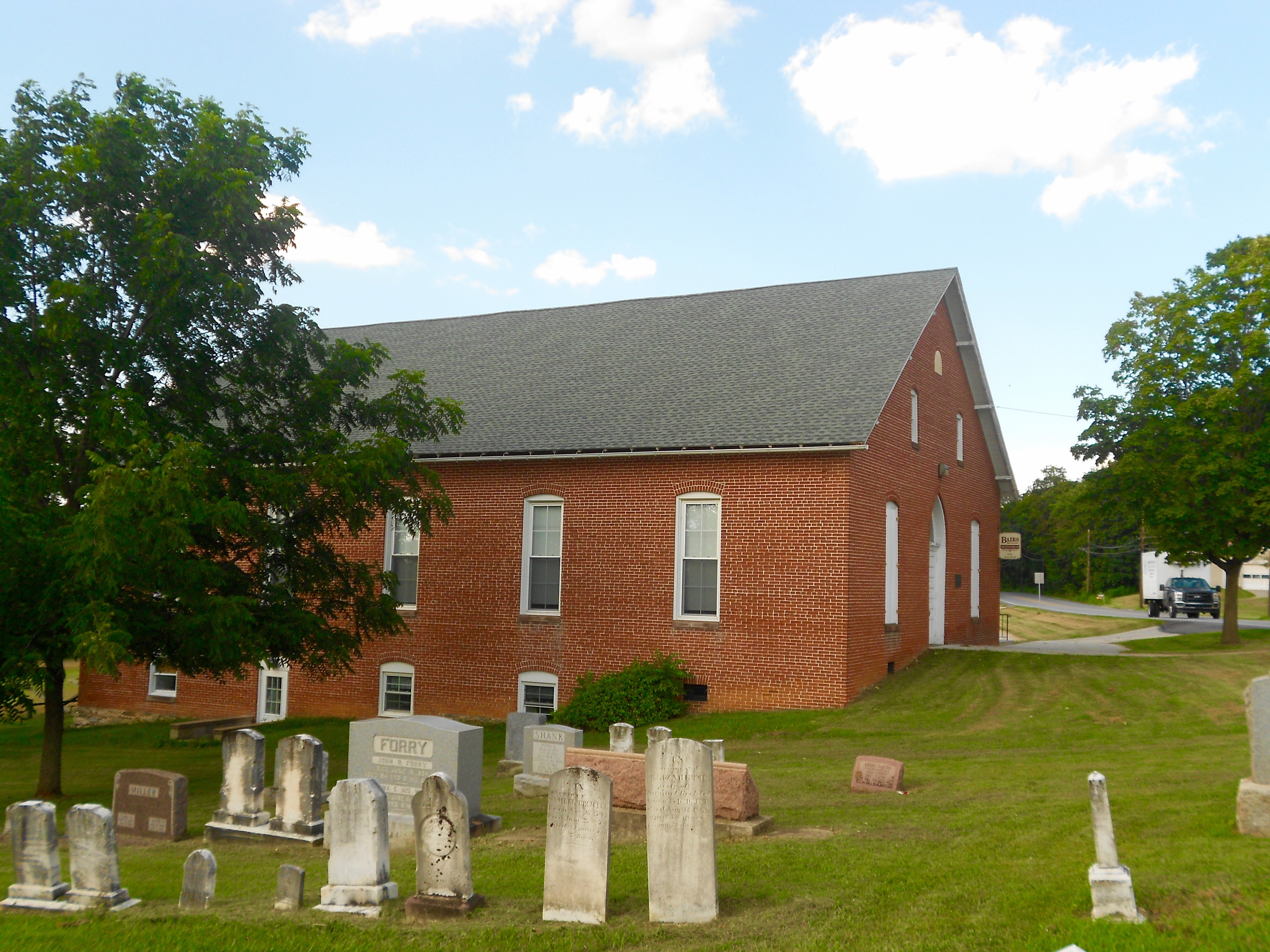
- Bair's Mennonite Meetinghouse

- Location in York County and the state of Pennsylvania.
- Country: United States
- State: Pennsylvania
- County: York
- Settled: 1738
- Incorporated: 1750

Government
  - Type: Board of Supervisors

Area
  - Total: 14.55 sq mi (37.69 km^{2})
  - Land: 14.02 sq mi (36.30 km^{2})
  - Water: 0.54 sq mi (1.39 km^{2})

Population (2020)
  - Total: 3,028 ▼
  - Estimate (2023): 3,055
  - Density: 219.5/sq mi (84.74/km^{2})
- Time zone: UTC-5 (Eastern (EST))
  - Summer (DST): UTC-4 (EDT)
- Area code: 717
- FIPS code: 42-133-33624
- Website: https://heidelbergtwpmunicipal.com/

Historical population
Census	Pop.	Note	%±
1850	1,616		—
1860	1,758		8.8%
1870	2,266		28.9%
1880	916		−59.6%
1890	954		4.1%
1900	1,013		6.2%
1910	985		−2.8%
1920	982		−0.3%
1930	1,000		1.8%
1940	1,040		4.0%
1950	1,138		9.4%
1990	2,622		—
2000	2,970		13.3%
2010	3,078		3.6%
2020	3,028		−1.6%
2023 (est.)	3,055		0.9%
U.S. Decennial Census

Heidelberg Township is a township in York County, Pennsylvania, United States. The township was erected in 1750 and encompassed the land grant known as Digges' Choice, a warrant granted to John Digges in 1727 by the colonial-era Province of Maryland, prior to the time the Mason–Dixon line fixed the final boundary between Maryland and Pennsylvania. The population of Heidelberg Township was 3,028 at the 2020 census.

The township consisted of 9,030 acres and extended as far west as the borough (town) of McSherrystown. The township included the borough (town) of Hanover until Hanover was made a borough in 1815. When Adams County was formed from western York County in 1800, the portion of Heidelberg Township that was included in York County was subsequently renamed Conewago Township.

In 1860, the western half of Heidelberg Township including the area around Hanover was split off to form Penn Township. Although residents of this township have a Hanover address, the children attend Spring Grove School District.

== Geography ==
According to the United States Census Bureau, the township has a total area of 15.0 square miles (39 km^{2}), of which 14.5 square miles (38 km^{2}) is land and 0.5 square miles (1.3 km^{2}), or 3.41%, is water.

== Demographics ==
As of the 2000 census, there were 2,970 people, 1,082 households, and 871 families residing in the township. The population density was 205.4 inhabitants per square mile (79.3/km^{2}). There were 1,104 housing units at an average density of 76.4 per square mile (29.5/km^{2}). The racial makeup of the township was 97.91% White, 0.47% African American, 0.30% Native American, 0.13% Asian, 0.07% Pacific Islander, 0.27% from other races, and 0.84% from two or more races. Hispanic or Latino of any race were 0.64% of the population.

There were 1,082 households, out of which 35.4% had children under the age of 18 living with them, 73.3% were married couples living together, 4.8% had a female householder with no husband present, and 19.5% were non-families. 15.2% of all households were made up of individuals, and 6.2% had someone living alone who was 65 years of age or older. The average household size was 2.74 and the average family size was 3.06.

In the township, the population was spread out, with 25.8% under the age of 18, 5.5% from 18 to 24, 30.8% from 25 to 44, 27.0% from 45 to 64, and 10.9% who were 65 years of age or older. The median age was 39 years. For every 100 females, there were 102.5 males. For every 100 females age 18 and over, there were 101.5 males.

The median income for a household in the township was $51,976, and the median income for a family was $56,763. Males had a median income of $38,429 versus $23,225 for females. The per capita income for the township was $23,506. About 2.3% of families and 2.9% of the population were below the poverty line, including 3.2% of those under age 18 and 6.5% of those age 65 or over.
