= Hanover High School (Pennsylvania) =

Hanover Senior High School

Location
- 401 Moul Ave; Hanover, Pennsylvania; United States
- Coordinates: 39.818517°N 76.968986°W

Information
- Type: Public
- Opened: 1920
- School district: Hanover Public School District
- NCES District ID: 4211450
- CEEB code: 391625
- NCES School ID: 421145004571
- Principal: Marc W. Abels
- Teaching staff: 39.56 (FTE)
- Grades: 9th - 12th
- Enrollment: 590 (2023–2024)
- Student to teacher ratio: 14.91
- Color: Black Orange
- Team name: Nighthawks
- USNWR ranking: Bronze
- Feeder schools: Hanover Middle School
- Website: www.hpsd.k12.pa.us/buildings/high/

Hanover Senior High School is located at 401 Moul Ave, Hanover, Pennsylvania. It is part of the Hanover Public School District. According to the National Center for Education Statistics, in 2018–2019, the school reported an enrollment of 481 pupils in grades 9th through 12th. The school employed 35.56 full-time-equivalent teachers, yielding a student–teacher ratio of 13.53:1. The school's colors are orange and black, and the mascot is the Nighthawk.

== Extracurriculars ==
The high school's students have access to a variety of clubs, activities and an extensive sports program.

=== Sports ===
The District funds:

Boys

- Baseball - AA
- Basketball- AA
- Football - AA
- Golf - AA
- Soccer - A
- Tennis - AA
- Track and Field - AA
- Wrestling - AA

Girls

- Basketball - AA
- Field Hockey - AA
- Soccer (Fall) - A
- Softball - AA
- Girls' Tennis - AA
- Track and Field - AA
- Volleyball - AA

Middle School Sports

Boys

- Basketball
- Cross Country
- Football
- Soccer
- Track and Field
- Wrestling

Girls

- Basketball
- Cross Country
- Field Hockey
- Soccer
- Track and Field
- Volleyball

According to Interscholastic Athletic Disclosure Form, 2014
