= Eichelberger High School =

- U.S. National Register of Historic Places
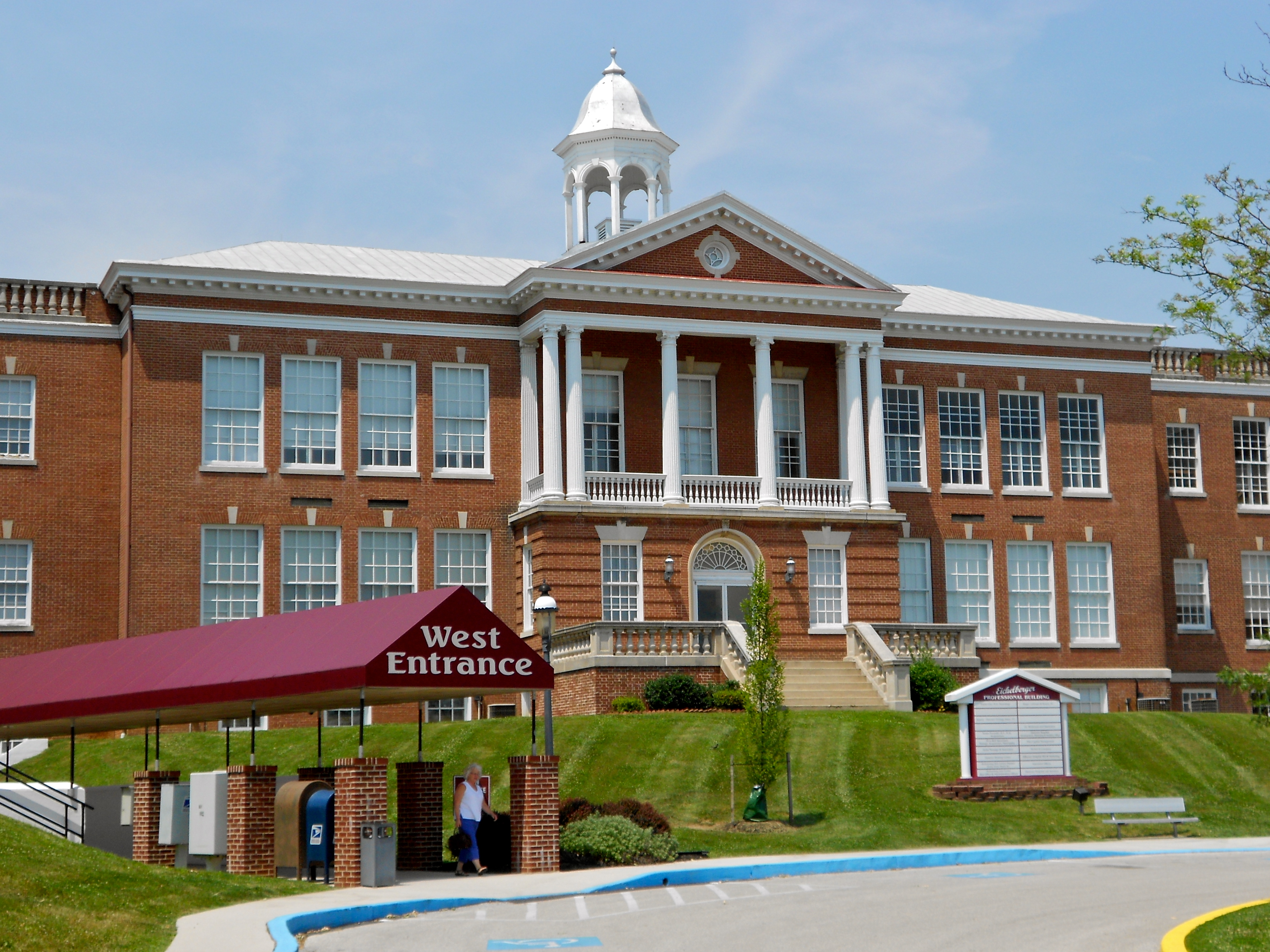

- Location within Pennsylvania Location within the United States
- Location: 195 Stock St., Hanover, Pennsylvania
- Coordinates: 39°48′22″N 76°59′10″W
- Area: 4 acres (1.6 ha)
- Built: 1896, 1931–1932
- Architect: Reinhardt Dempwolf; Hasness & Albright
- Architectural style: Georgian Revival
- NRHP reference No.: 95000517
- Added to NRHP: April 27, 1995

Eichelberger High School, also known as Hanover Middle School and Eichelberger Academy, is a historic high school building located at Hanover, York County, Pennsylvania. It was built in 1896, and altered and expanded in 1931-1932, with few design elements from the original building remaining. It is a five-part brick building in the Georgian Revival style, with a main building flanked by two wings connected by hyphens. The main building features a portico supported by six Ionic order columns and topped by a hipped roof and cupola.

It was added to the National Register of Historic Places in 1995. It is located in the Hanover Historic District.

== Notable students ==
- John Hostetter (1946–2016), actor
- Kaye Lynn McCool (1946–), Singer-Songwriter
