= Adaline Hohf Beery =

American author and journalist

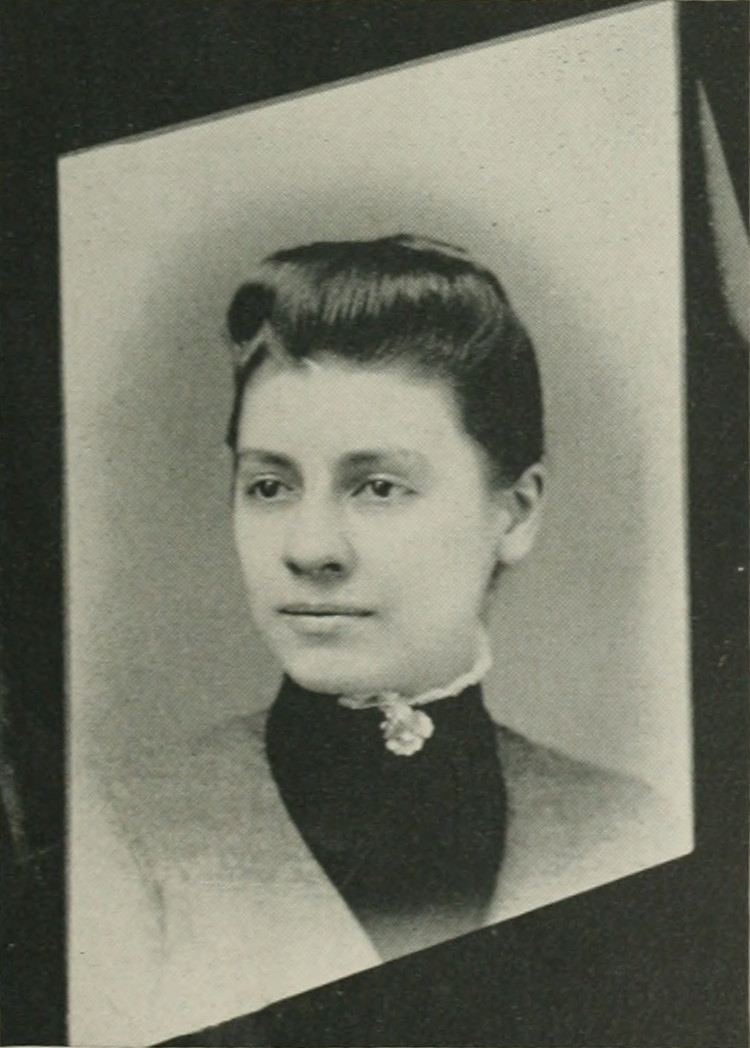
- Photo in A Woman of the Century
- Born: Adaline Hohf; December 20, 1859; Hanover, Pennsylvania, U.S.
- Died: February 24, 1929 (aged 69); Kane, Illinois, U.S.
- Resting place: Bluff City Cemetery in Elgin, Illinois, U.S.
- Education: Mount Morris College
- Occupations: Author; newspaper editor; songbook compiler; hymnwriter
- Spouse: William Beery (m. 1888)
- Children: Leon Felix Beery, Judith Beery Garber
- Writing career
- Language: English, Pennsylvania German

Signature
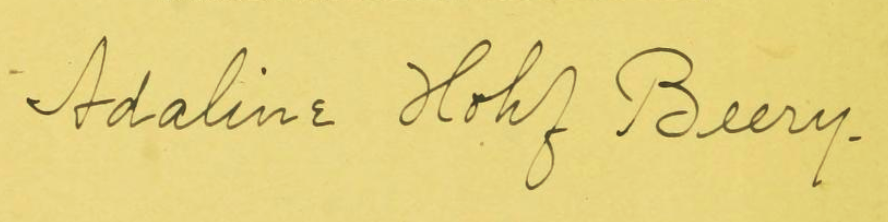

Adaline Hohf Beery (née, Hohf; after marriage, Beery, sometimes misspelled Berry; December 20, 1859 – February 24, 1929) was an American author, newspaper and magazine editor, songbook compiler, as well as a hymnwriter. Born into a Pennsylvania Dutch community, her first job after graduating from Mount Morris College in Illinois was as a compositor in a printing office. She served as the editor of The Golden Dawn magazine and The Young Disciple child's paper; compiled a song-book, Gospel Chimes; and was employed by the Brethren Publishing House.

== Early life and education ==
Adaline Hohf was born in Hanover, Pennsylvania, December 20, 1859. She was of mixed ancestry. Her father, Michael Hohf (1821–1881), was of Dutch extraction, and her mother, whose maiden name was Elizabeth Bucher (1821–1914), was of Swiss ancestry. Her siblings were Emanuel (1853–1864) and Martha (1864–1948). Born in a Pennsylvania Dutch community, the Pennsylvania German language was the first she learned to speak. She removed with her parents, at the age of four years, to Frederick, Maryland, where she spent her childhood days amid the rural sights and sounds along the Linganore Creek. In 1870, her family removed to Iowa, where, as a school-girl in her teens, she first attempted verse.

She completed the academic course of Mount Morris College in 1882.

== Career ==
A talent for composition began its development in her teens. Sketches, in the form of both poetry and prose, found their way into the local papers. She gave no particular evidence of a tendency to rhyme until 1884, at which time she resided in Illinois, when the death of a friend called forth a memorial tribute, which received such commendation from personal friends as to encourage her to continue to work in verse. Poems were frequently written by her afterward.

About six months after graduation from Mount Morris College, she entered a printing office as compositor, working there more than four years. In May, 1885, Beery undertook the editing of The Golden Dawn, an excellent but short-lived magazine published in Huntingdon, Pennsylvania.

On June 20, 1888, she married William Beery (1852–1956), an instructor in vocal music, and soon after rendered him valuable assistance in compiling an excellent song-book, Gospel Chimes, writing hymns and some music for it. She and her husband were located in Huntingdon, where she edited a child's paper known as The Young Disciple. Later, the husband and wife worked together in the Brethren Publishing House in Elgin, Illinois.

== Personal life ==
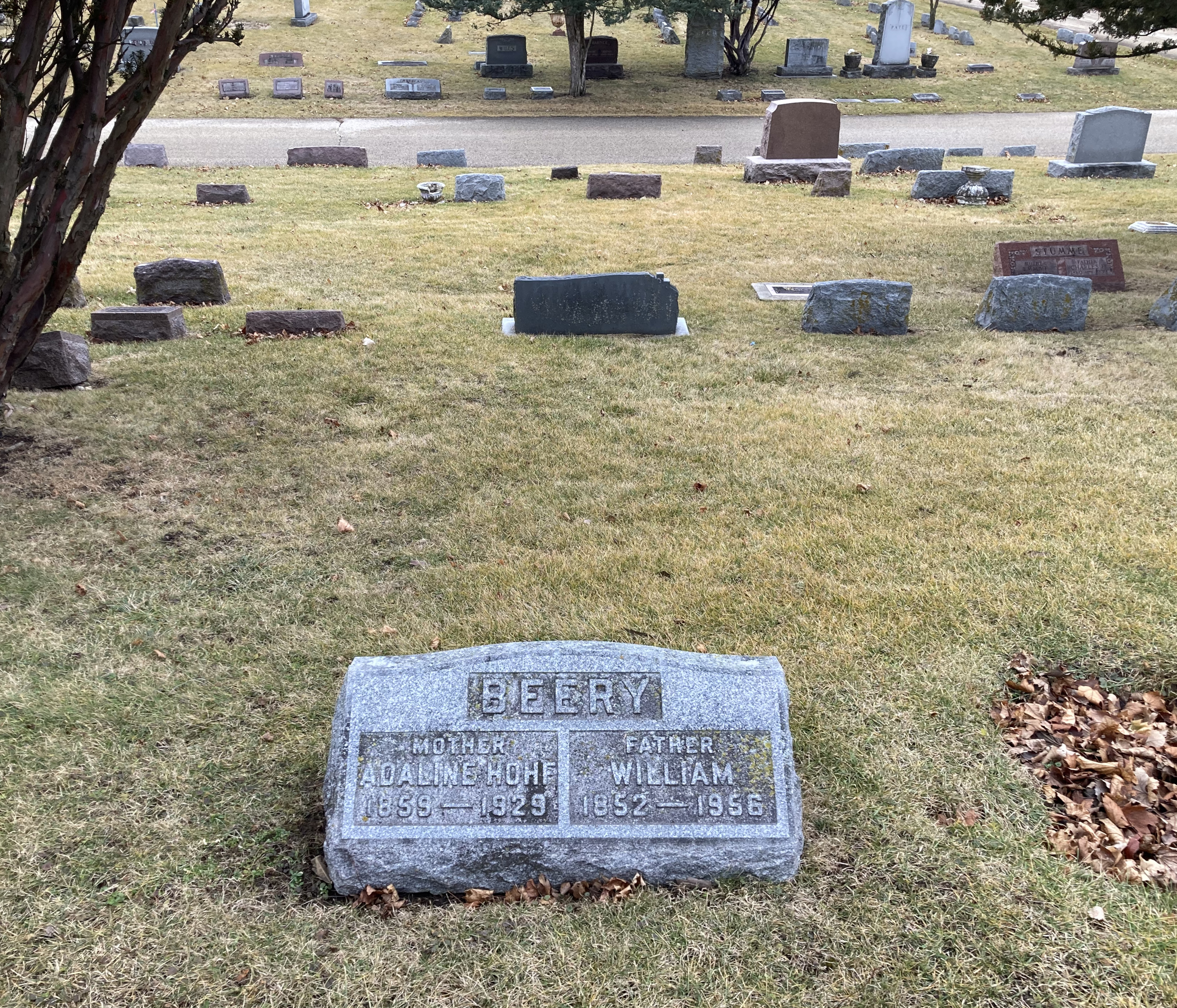
Beery's grave at Bluff City Cemetery

Her family consisted of a son, Leon Felix Beery, born in February 1891, and a daughter, Judith Garber, born in 1897. Beery died on February 24, 1929, in Kane, Illinois. She was buried at Bluff City Cemetery in Elgin.

== Selected works ==
=== Books ===
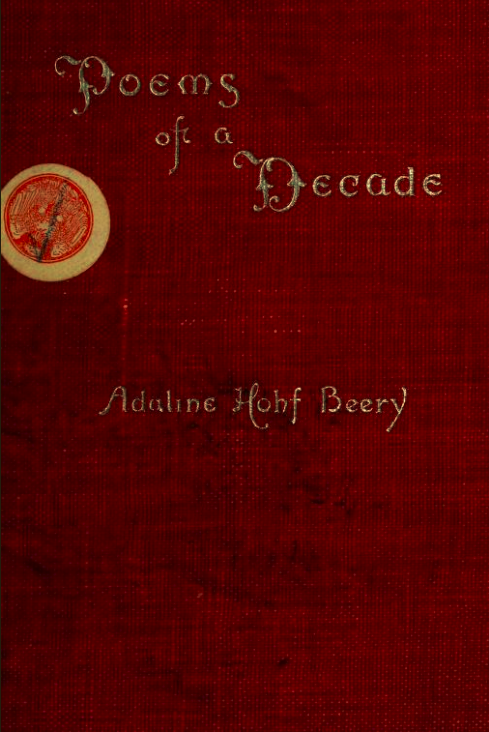
Poems of a decade, 1897

- Poems of a decade, 1897
- The rostrum : a collection of original recitations, dialogues, motion songs, etc. for day-schools and Christmas entertainments, 1900
- Christmas rainbow; a play for four girls and four boys six or seven years old., 1908
- A home for the Christ, an exercise for eleven boys., 1908

=== Hymns ===
She wrote the music for the hymn "The Holy Bible", and the lyrics for many more hymns:

- Abide with me, my Savior dear
- Bless Jehovah, O my soul, praise
- Bountiful Giver of goodness
- Come, gather, all tribes and all nations
- Come to the Master of the feast
- Do you purpose in your heart to be good and true
- Draw me, Jesus, close to thee
- Father, in thy golden kingdom
- Father, we would think on thee
- God of might, truth and right
- God sends the sunshine and the rain
- Hail, blessed Trinity, low here we bow
- Happy are the birds and flowers
- Hark, from every village
- Have you heard the master's call Sounding clear
- Hear the voice of the Master proclaiming to all
- Here we come, with songs of gladness
- I come to taste my Father's grace
- I learned a precious secret
- I long had been wandering
- I'll praise thee, Lord for length
- I'll sing of the Savior
- In all my thoughts, in all my ways
- In the days long ago
- In the Lord's good promises my heart is glad
- I've read of mansions in the skies
- Jesus, precious Friend and Savior
- Jesus, royal, heavenly Friend
- Jesus stands and offers comfort
- Leave all to him, O troubled soul
- Let your face be like the daybreak
- Lift up Immanuel's banner
- Lo a gleam from yonder heaven
- Lo what song breaks on the morning
- O angel with mission of healing
- O bring your best songs to our Savior
- O fair was the vision that flooded my soul
- O hark, what sounds are floating
- O mansions of beauty in heaven
- O mourn not for friends who have reached the bright shore
- O soul in the shadow of sin
- O Spirit holy, flame divineO sweet was the song
- O the dear love of a Savior and King
- O thou sacred book
- Onward, happy children
- Onward to the conflict, soldiers of the King
- Open your heart, brother
- Quickly and joyfully gather we now
- Rally, Christian workers, lift the standard high
- Rally to our standard, those who love the right
- Rows of cheerful faces
- See, the morn is brightening in the eastern sky
- Some day among the whiterobed throng
- Standing on the great King's highway
- Tell me the story of Jesus over and over again
- Tell of the love of our Savior and King
- The sun will pale before him
- There's a song of gladness in my heart today
- There's a Stranger stands
- They tell me that showers of blessing
- Through the world we're traveling
- Up, my brother, duty calls you
- Upon a gloomy hilltop, there fell
- Upon this holy Sabbath day
- We are happy little children
- We are little travelers Through the world
- We can sing of Christ the Lord
- We come to thee, O Holy Christ
- We come to worship thee, O holy one
- We come with banners waving
- We have come to sing the praise
- We sing of Christ our Savior
- We'll sing a pleasant song for our Children's Day
- We're a band of happy children, In a world of sin
- We're a temperance legion marching
- We're coming to work for the Master
- We're marching with banners all waving and bright
- When Jesus passed the figtree
- When Jesus was asked by his servants one day
- When my Savior speaks to me
- When weary walking the highway of life
- Why do you tarry, O sinner
- Why will you struggle, dear brother
