= Hanover, Pennsylvania =

Borough in Pennsylvania, US

- Borough
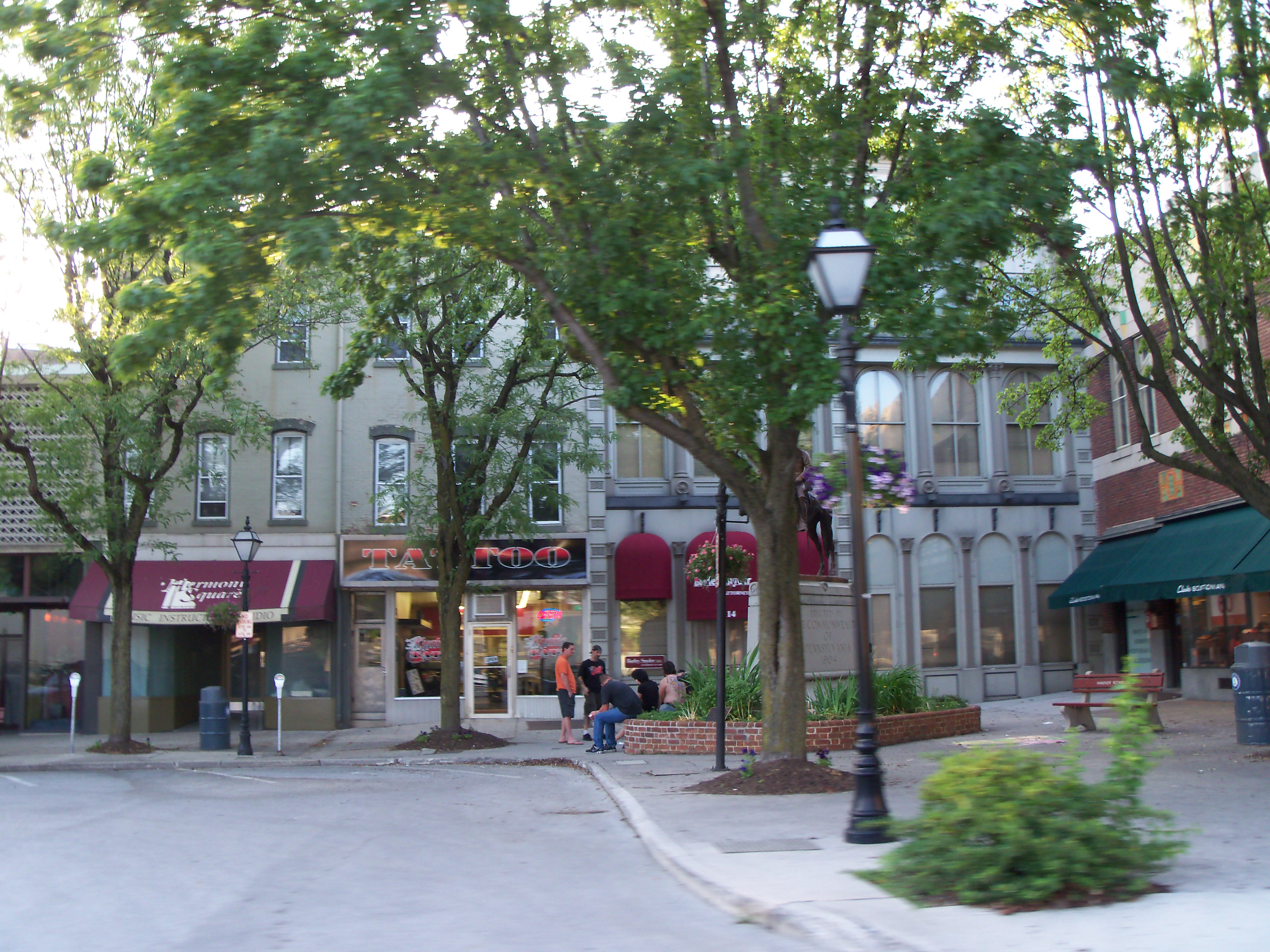
- Hanover Historic District

- Flag Seal
- Nicknames: Black Rose Community, Snack Capital of the World, Rogue's Roost
- Motto(s): Fiat Justitia (Latin: Let Justice be Done)
- Location in York County, Pennsylvania

- Location within Pennsylvania Location within the United States
- Coordinates: 39°48′26″N 76°59′5″W
- Country: United States
- State: Pennsylvania
- County: York
- Founded: 1763
- Incorporated: March 4, 1815
- Founder: Richard McAllister
- Named for: Hanover, Germany

Government
  - Type: Mayor–council
  - Mayor: Heidi Hormel
  - Borough manager: Margaret Lewis

Area
  - Total: 3.69 sq mi (9.57 km^{2})
  - Land: 3.69 sq mi (9.57 km^{2})
  - Water: 0 sq mi (0.00 km^{2})
- Elevation: 614 ft (187 m)

Population (2020)
  - Total: 16,429
  - Density: 4,445/sq mi (1,716.1/km^{2})
- Demonym: Hanoverians
- Time zone: UTC-5 (Eastern)
  - Summer (DST): UTC-4 (Eastern)
- ZIP Code: 17331, 17332, 17333, 17335
- Area code: 717 and 223
- FIPS code: 42-32448
- GNIS feature ID: 1215748
- Website: hanoverboroughpa.gov

Hanover is a borough in York County, Pennsylvania, United States. The population was 16,439 at the 2020 census. Located 19 miles (31 km) southwest of York and 54 miles (87 km) north-northwest of Baltimore, Maryland, the town is situated in a productive agricultural region. It is named after the German city of Hanover and is a principal city of the York–Hanover metropolitan area.

Hanover was the site of the final encounter between the Union and Confederate armies before they fought against each other in the Battle of Gettysburg during the American Civil War. Hanover has since become known as the "Snack Food Capital of the World" due to the establishment of multiple food manufacturing businesses there during the 20th century. Notable companies based in the borough include Utz Brands and Snyder's of Hanover.

== History ==
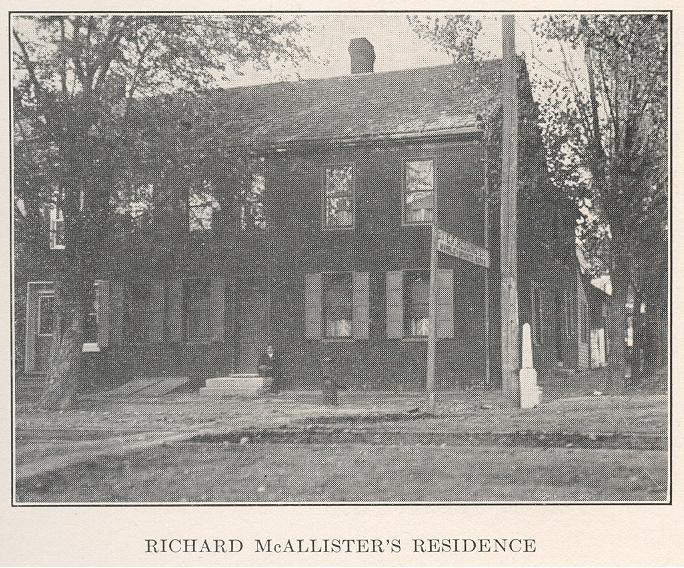
Richard McAllister's residence

In 1727, John Digges, an Irish nobleman of Prince George's County, Maryland, obtained a grant of 10,000 acres (40 km^{2}) of land where Hanover is now located from Charles Calvert, 5th Baron Baltimore. The area was called Digges Choice, and in 1730, a group of Catholics started the settlement that became known as the Conewego Settlement. Settlers from both Maryland and Pennsylvania began moving into the area in the 1730s. At this time, Maryland and Pennsylvania did not agree on the northern border of Maryland and the southern border of Pennsylvania, and the area that is now Hanover was in the disputed area claimed by both states. This led to numerous disputes about property ownership from the 1730s until 1760. The dispute was settled when Maryland and Pennsylvania hired British expert surveyors Charles Mason and Jeremiah Dixon to survey what became known as the Mason–Dixon line. This line was surveyed between 1763 and 1767, and put an end to decades of disputes over rights and ownership.

In 1745, a Scot-Irishman named Richard McAllister (father of Matthew McAllister) purchased the tract of land upon which the original town of Hanover was built. McAllister was a Presbyterian who had recently migrated from the Cumberland Valley. Hanover at that time was covered with a dense forest of hickory, walnut, and oak trees. McAllister erected a log house at what is now the corner of Baltimore and Middle streets, and opened a store and tavern. In 1763, McAllister divided his farm into lots and founded the town of Hanover. German settlers nicknamed the settlement "Hickory Town" after the thick groves of hickory trees that grew in the area. The name Hanover was suggested by Michael Tanner, who was one of the commissioners who laid out York County in 1749 and owned large tracts of land southeast of the town. Tanner's choice of the name came from the fact that he was a native of Hanover, Germany. The town's founders, who wanted to please the German settlers, agreed to the name. Hanover was also sometimes referred to as "McAllister's Town" in its early years.

=== Hanover and the American Revolution ===
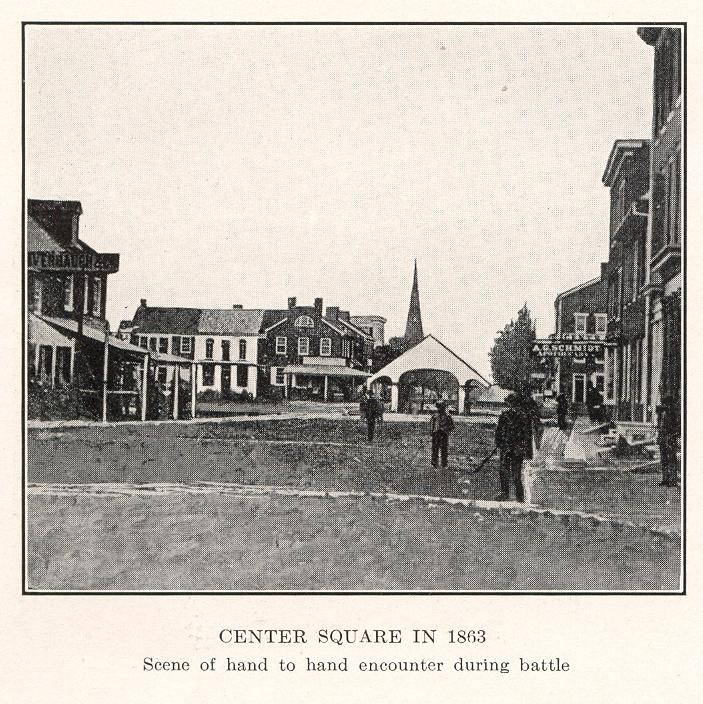
Center Square in 1863

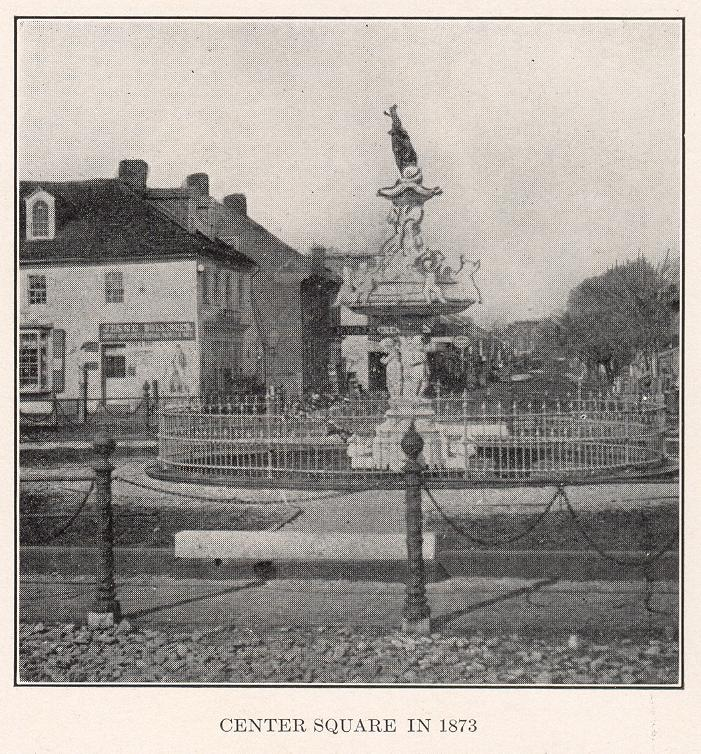
Center Square in 1873

Thomas Jefferson spent the night of April 12, 1776 at the Sign of the Horse, an inn, owned by Caspar Reinecker on Frederick Street. Records indicate that Jefferson paid "Rhenegher" 11 shillings, 6 pence for dinner and lodging. He was on his way from Monticello to Philadelphia to attend the first meeting of the Continental Congress, where on June 10 he would begin to draft the Declaration of Independence. At the time, Hanover was located at the crossing of two well-traveled roads, one from the port of Baltimore to points north and west and the other between Philadelphia and the Valley of Virginia. When Jefferson returned from Philadelphia to Monticello, he again dined and spent the night of September 5 at Reinecker's inn.

At the start of the Revolutionary War, Hanover consisted of about 500 homes, most of which were built out of logs. After the war, the population increased steadily until the War of 1812. At the time of the advance of the British on Baltimore in 1814, Hanover and vicinity furnished two companies of infantry commanded by Captain Frederick Metzgar and John Bair. These two companies left Hanover on foot Sunday morning, August 28, 1814, and reached the city of Baltimore at 9 A.M., Tuesday. September 11, where they were marched to North Point, spending that night on their arms, and next day, the memorable September 12, 1814, they took part in the engagement with the British, who retreated soon after. The Hanover Companies together with other companies from York County, returned home after two weeks' service, not being needed longer.

After the War of 1812, the town experienced only minor growth until 1852, when construction of the Hanover Branch Railroad to Hanover Junction was completed. In 1858 the Gettysburg Railroad opened a railroad link westward to Gettysburg. The Hanover and York Railroad completed a rail line to York in 1876.

=== Civil War era ===
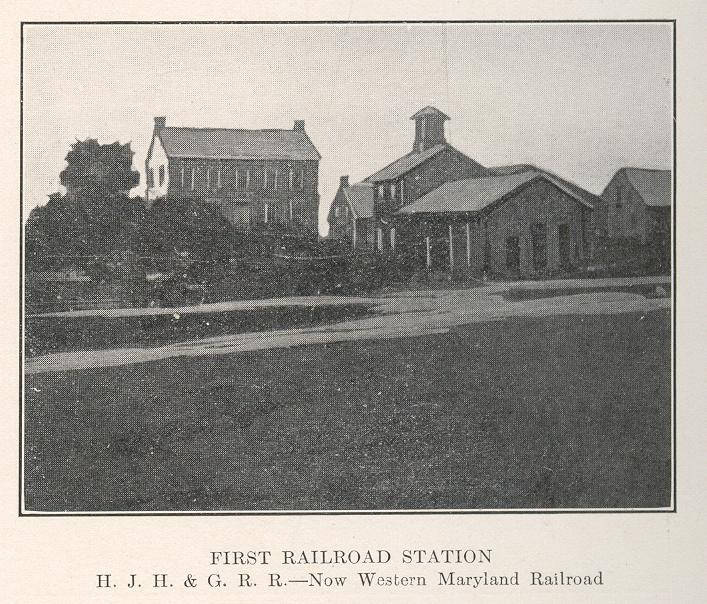
The first railroad station in Hanover

During the American Civil War, the Battle of Hanover was fought on June 30, 1863. Union cavalry under Judson Kilpatrick encountered Confederate cavalry under J.E.B. Stuart and a sharp fight ensued in the town and in farm fields to the south, particularly along Frederick Street. The final encounter between Union and Confederate forces prior to the Battle of Gettysburg, this inconclusive engagement delayed the Confederate cavalry on their way to the Battle of Gettysburg. Three days before the battle, another detachment of Virginia cavalry had briefly occupied Hanover, "collecting" supplies and horses from local citizens.

Over the years, its industries have included the making of cigars, gloves, silks, flavine, water wheels, flour, shirts, shoes, machine-shop products, furniture, wire cloth, and ironstone grinders.

The town has lent its name to a brand of canned vegetables, and a mail-order gift company based there. Hanover's first newspaper, Die Pennsylvania Wochenschrift, was published in German in 1797. In 1805, the "Hanover Gazette" followed suit, also published in German.

The Hanover Historic District, Eichelberger High School, George Nace (Neas) House, and US Post Office-Hanover are listed on the National Register of Historic Places.

=== Modern era ===
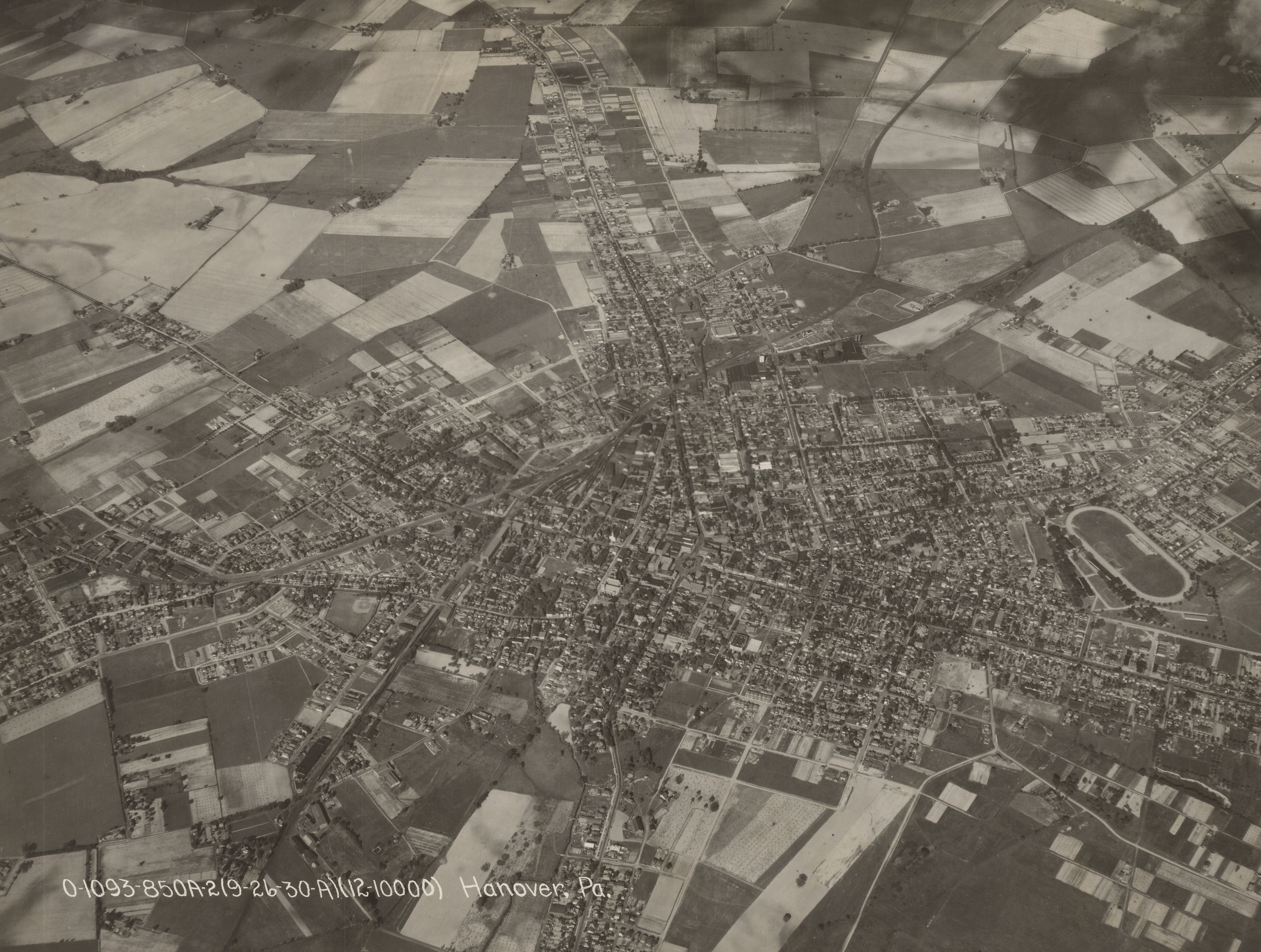
Aerial view of Hanover in 1930

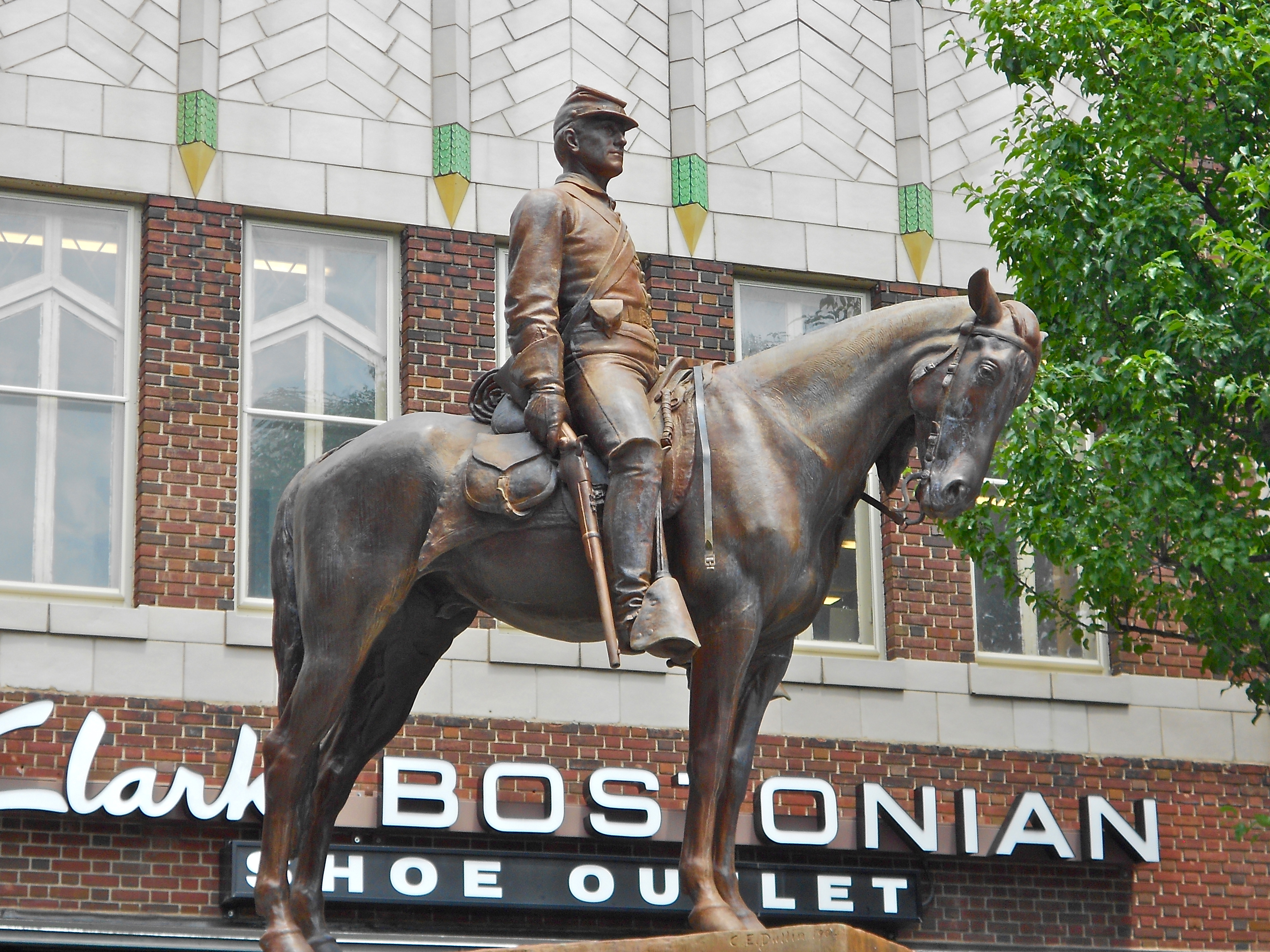
The sculpture Sentry, erected in Center Square in 1904, shows a Union cavalry soldier on sentry duty.

On July 13, 1991, Hanover's town square was the site of a two-day race riot. During the summer, White residents were upset by the presence of young Black men in the town square, who had begun to gather there after the local parks were temporarily closed. In addition, two young, interracial couples had been seen walking downtown. In the lead-up to the riot, White residents spat on the Black men visiting their girlfriends in the town square, while the Baltimore Sun reported that there had been tension "building for several weeks," and the Hanover Evening Sun reported that at least one resident "had heard rumors throughout the week that a motorcycle gang was coming into town to start trouble with a few interracial groups of juveniles." Other residents were quoted stating that the biker gang's explicit purpose was to "take back the town." On July 13, by around 11:00pm, an estimated 200 to 400 White people gathered on one side of the town square, with a much smaller group of a "half dozen" Black juveniles on the other side, with various police forming a line between the two. Both groups shouted at one another throughout the night. Eventually, a car full of Black juveniles pulled up alongside the bikers before some of the bikers began chasing the car down the alleyway, which elicited a cheer from some members of the White crowd. The police line struggled to contain the rioters and eventually ordered the smaller, Black crowd to disperse just after 11:00pm. As the smaller side dispersed, police lost control of the rioters, who began to fight using weapons like "baseball bats, knives, tire chains, bricks and hockey sticks," though there was only one serious injury reported. Eleven people were arrested during the first night; on the second day, a state of emergency was declared by Mayor W. Roy Attlesberger, who instructed police to arrest anyone on the streets after midnight. Police shut down major roadways into Hanover. Nevertheless, many minor skirmishes broke out, and ultimately thirty six people were arrested including the eleven from the day prior. Media reports following the two-day event described the town square as looking like a "battlefield." In the aftermath of the riot, according to the Baltimore Sun, "many residents interviewed yesterday shared the view ... [blaming] the troubles on the two women for dating Black men and bringing them into Hanover," many of whom also referred to the Black residents as "coloreds."

On October 24, 2018, Hanover Borough's first African-American mayor was sworn in. Hanover Borough council selected Myneca Ojo, 56, to fill the office recently vacated by Ben Adams, who moved away from the community. Myneca Ojo was the former Director of Diversity at the Pennsylvania Turnpike Commission. She is the second woman to be mayor in the borough. Margret Hormel was the first woman mayor, serving from 1993 to 2007.

== Demographics ==
Historical population
Census	Pop.	Note	%±
1820	946		—
1830	1,005		6.2%
1840	1,070		6.5%
1850	1,210		13.1%
1860	1,630		34.7%
1870	1,839		12.8%
1880	2,317		26.0%
1890	3,746		61.7%
1900	5,320		42.0%
1910	7,057		32.7%
1920	8,664		22.8%
1930	11,805		36.3%
1940	13,076		10.8%
1950	14,048		7.4%
1960	15,538		10.6%
1970	15,623		0.5%
1980	14,890		−4.7%
1990	14,399		−3.3%
2000	14,535		0.9%
2010	15,289		5.2%
2020	16,429		7.5%
2021 (est.)	16,478	▲	0.3%

=== 2020 census ===
As of the 2020 census, Hanover had a population of 16,429. The median age was 41.2 years. 19.6% of residents were under the age of 18 and 21.0% of residents were 65 years of age or older. For every 100 females there were 92.5 males, and for every 100 females age 18 and over there were 90.1 males age 18 and over.

100.0% of residents lived in urban areas, while 0.0% lived in rural areas.

There were 7,344 households in Hanover, of which 23.8% had children under the age of 18 living in them. Of all households, 36.6% were married-couple households, 21.5% were households with a male householder and no spouse or partner present, and 31.8% were households with a female householder and no spouse or partner present. About 36.8% of all households were made up of individuals and 16.0% had someone living alone who was 65 years of age or older.

There were 7,941 housing units, of which 7.5% were vacant. The homeowner vacancy rate was 2.0% and the rental vacancy rate was 7.1%.

Racial composition as of the 2020 census
Race	Number	Percent
White	13,718	83.5%
Black or African American	409	2.5%
American Indian and Alaska Native	60	0.4%
Asian	140	0.9%
Native Hawaiian and Other Pacific Islander	9	0.1%
Some other race	918	5.6%
Two or more races	1,175	7.2%
Hispanic or Latino (of any race)	1,867	11.4%

=== 2010 census ===
As of the 2010 census, there were 15,289 people and 6,571 households in the borough. The population density was 4,117.7 inhabitants per square mile (1,589.9/km^{2}). There were 7,263 housing units and the racial makeup of the borough was 91.9% White, 1.2% African American, 0.2% Native American, 1.0% Asian, 1% Pacific Islander, 0.74% from other races, and 1.6% from two or more races. Hispanic or Latino of any race were 7.3% of the population. The ancestries for Hanover include: German (42%), Irish (11%), United States (10%), English (8%), Italian (3%), and Dutch (2%).

Of the 6,571 households, 23.4% had children under the age of 18 living with them, 44.6% were married couples living together, 9.4% had a female householder with no husband present, and 42.2% were non-families. 36.3% of all households were made up of individuals, and 16.6% had someone living alone who was 65 years of age or older. The average household size was 2.16 and the average family size was 2.81.

In the borough the population was spread out, with 20.1% under the age of 18, 8.0% from 18 to 24, 28.0% from 25 to 44, 22.6% from 45 to 64, and 21.2% who were 65 years of age or older. The median age was 40 years. For every 100 females, there were 91.4 males. For every 100 females age 18 and over, there were 87.5 males.

The median income for a household in the borough was $45,110, and the median income for a family was $45,156. Males had a median income of $31,206 versus $21,512 for females. The per capita income for the borough was $20,516. About 4.5% of families and 7.7% of the population were below the poverty line, including 8.7% of those under age 18 and 6.4% of those age 65 or over.

=== Greater Hanover area ===
The Greater Hanover area has a population of about 55,000 residents. The community is made up of several areas such as Hanover Borough, Penn Township, Heidelberg Township, Manheim Township, West Manheim Township, Conewago Township, Berwick Township, and Union Township. All of these areas have Hanover, PA listed as their address and 17331 as their zip code.

== Economy ==
=== Manufacturing ===
Hanover is considered by many to be the snack food capital of the United States and has been featured multiple times on the Food Network. It has been home to Utz Brands since 1921 which still produces its products there (along with an Utz outlet store) and Snyder's of Hanover since 1905. In nearby areas there are other snack food makers including Hanover Foods, Wolfgang Candy, Martin's Potato Chips, Stauffer Biscuit Company, Hershey Foods, Herr's and Gibbles Potato Chips, among others.

Emeco founded in 1944 manufactures designer furniture, including their signature Navy Chair. Menchey Music Service was founded in Hanover in 1936 and maintains its headquarters at the same location. The Vulcan Materials Company owns a large limestone quarry located to the north of Hanover, with an office on Oxford Avenue.

=== Retail ===
Retail shopping areas in Hanover include "The Golden Mile" along Eisenhower Drive, downtown Hanover, Gateway Hanover, and North Hanover Mall.

== Arts and culture ==
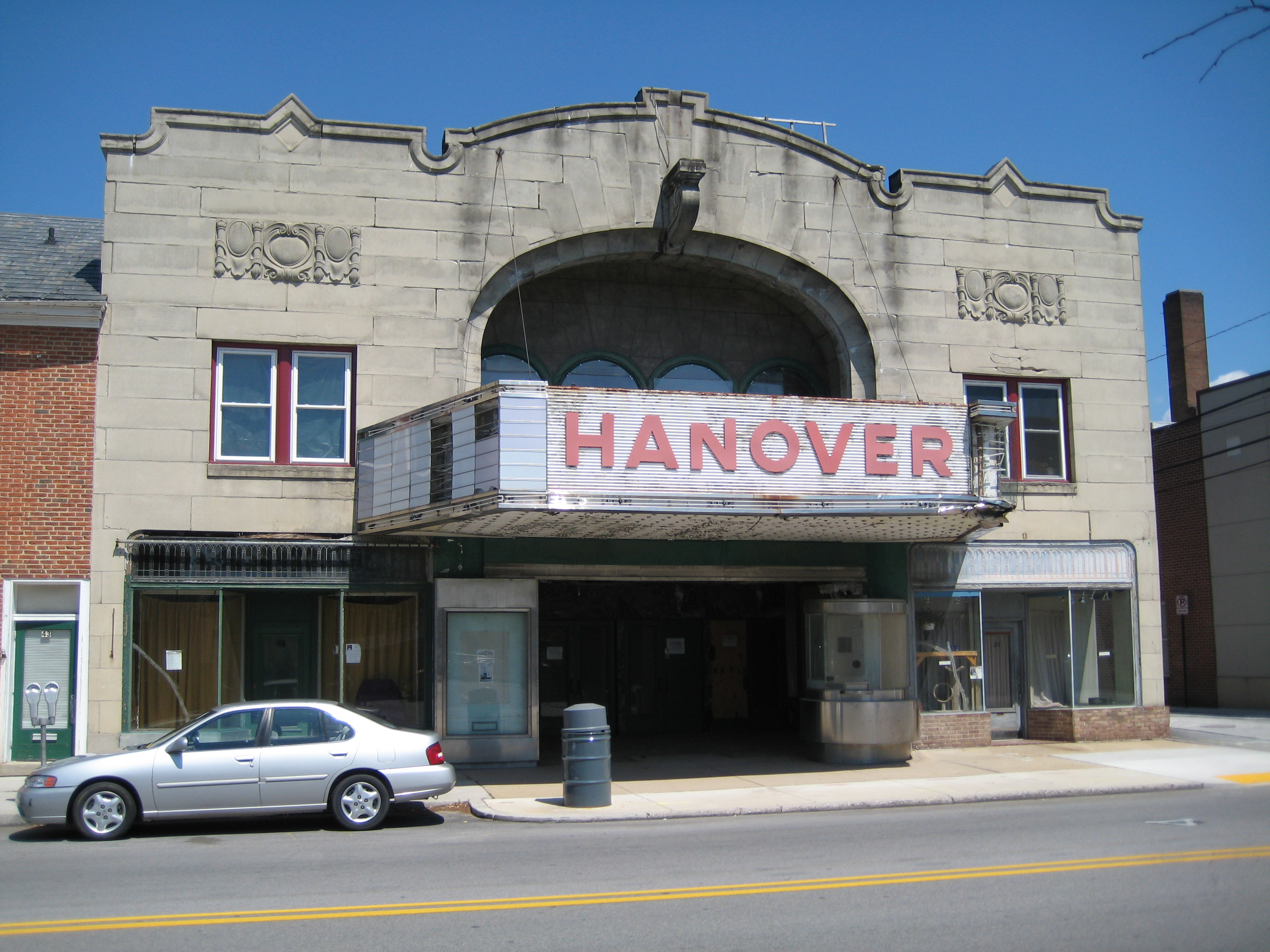
Hanover Theater, built 1928

Some local places of interest in the Hanover area include the Neas House, a local history museum of the Hanover Area Historical Society, the R H Sheppard Museum for Diesel engines, and the former Hanover Shoe Company, a large shoe factory from 1910 now converted into apartments.

Codorus State Park has a large artificial lake near Hanover.

The Eichelberger Performing Arts Center was established in 1998 and occupies over one third of the old Eichelberger school on Stock Street. It hosts a variety of road shows and show rentals. This is the area's leader in quality Live Theatre, Family Entertainment, Concerts, Comedy Performances and Community Theatre. Each year, it reaches over 25,000 people and more throughout the community.

== Education ==
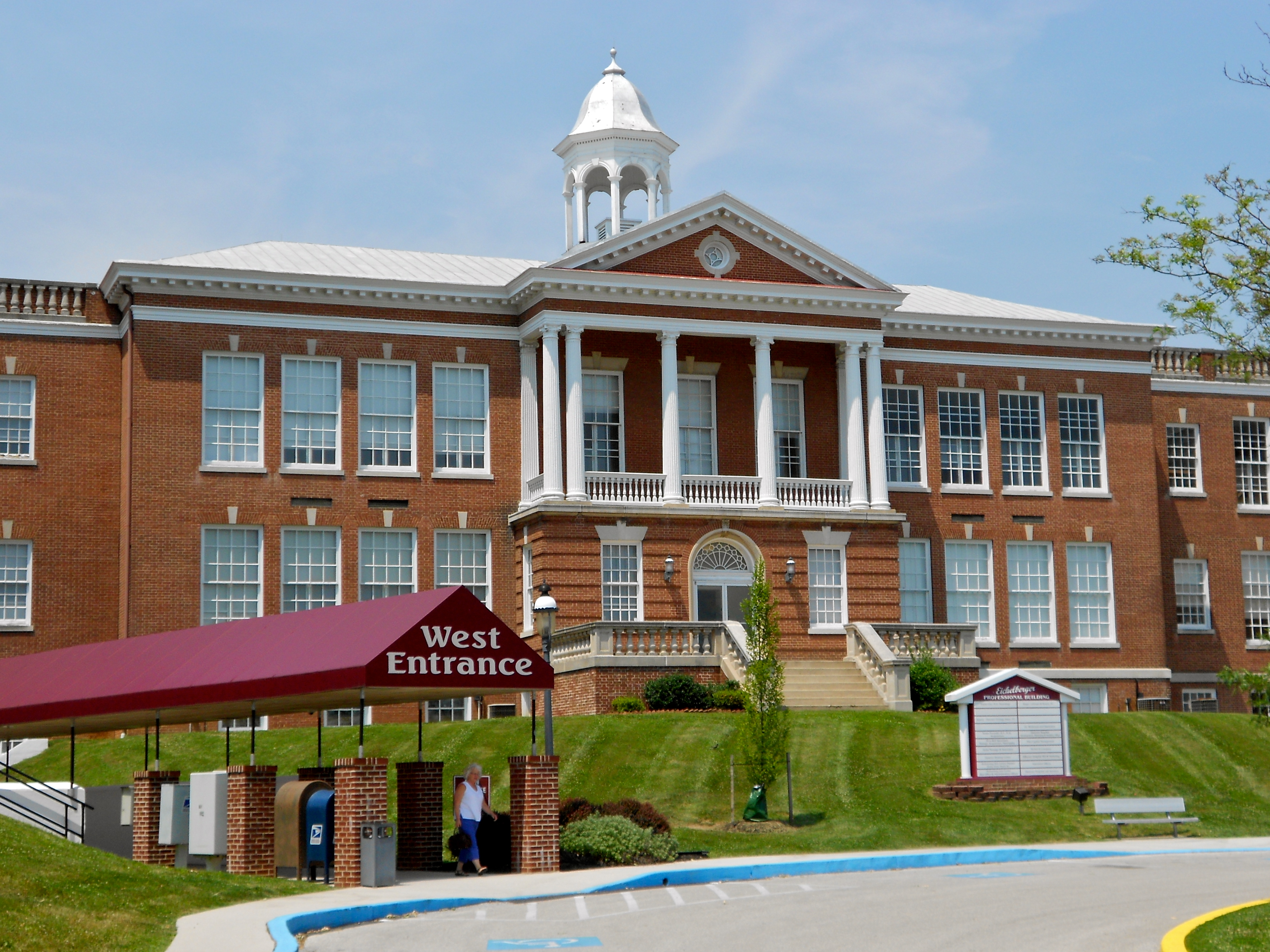
The former Eichelberger High School

The Hanover Public School District serves Hanover borough and has five schools:

- Clearview Elementary School
- Hanover Street Elementary School
- Washington Elementary School
- Hanover Middle School
- Hanover High School

The South Western School District serves Penn Township, West Manheim Township, and Manheim Township within the zip code of Hanover and has five schools:

- Baresville Elementary School
- Manheim Elementary School
- Park Hills Elementary School
- West Manheim Elementary School
- Emory H. Markle Middle School
- South Western High School

Catholic elementary schools in Hanover include St. Teresa of Calcutta Catholic School and St. Joseph Catholic School. The Catholic high school is Delone Catholic High School in adjacent McSherrystown.

== Transportation ==
The Hanover area is served by Pennsylvania Routes 94, 194, 116, and 216. Route 94 intersects with Route 194 at the square and extends north to Carlisle, Pennsylvania and south to Baltimore. Route 194 intersects with Route 94 and Route 116 at the square and extends north to Dillsburg, Pennsylvania and south to Frederick, Maryland. Route 116 overlaps Route 194 and runs through the square for three blocks. It extends west to Gettysburg, Pennsylvania and east to Spring Grove, Pennsylvania. Route 216 branches southwest off of Route 116 and runs through Codorus State Park.

Hanover is served by four routes of the Rabbit Transit bus system.

== Notable people ==
- Elaine Anaya, artist and former First Lady of New Mexico
- Adaline Hohf Beery, author, newspaper editor, songbook compiler, hymn writer
- Al Bemiller, American football player
- Matthias N. Forney, steam locomotive inventor and engineer, creator of the Forney engines used in early New York City elevated railways
- Christian Gobrecht, Chief Engraver of the United States Mint
- Donora Hillard, author
- John Luther Long, author of the short story "Madame Butterfly," later a Puccini opera
- The Pixies Three, teenage girl-group trio
- Ann Roth, costume designer

== In popular culture ==
The bowling scene in the movie Girl, Interrupted was filmed in the basement of the Sheppard Mansion. The mansion and its twin, Myers Mansion, across town both still have bowling alleys in their basements.
