= McSherrystown, Pennsylvania =

Borough in Pennsylvania, US

- Borough
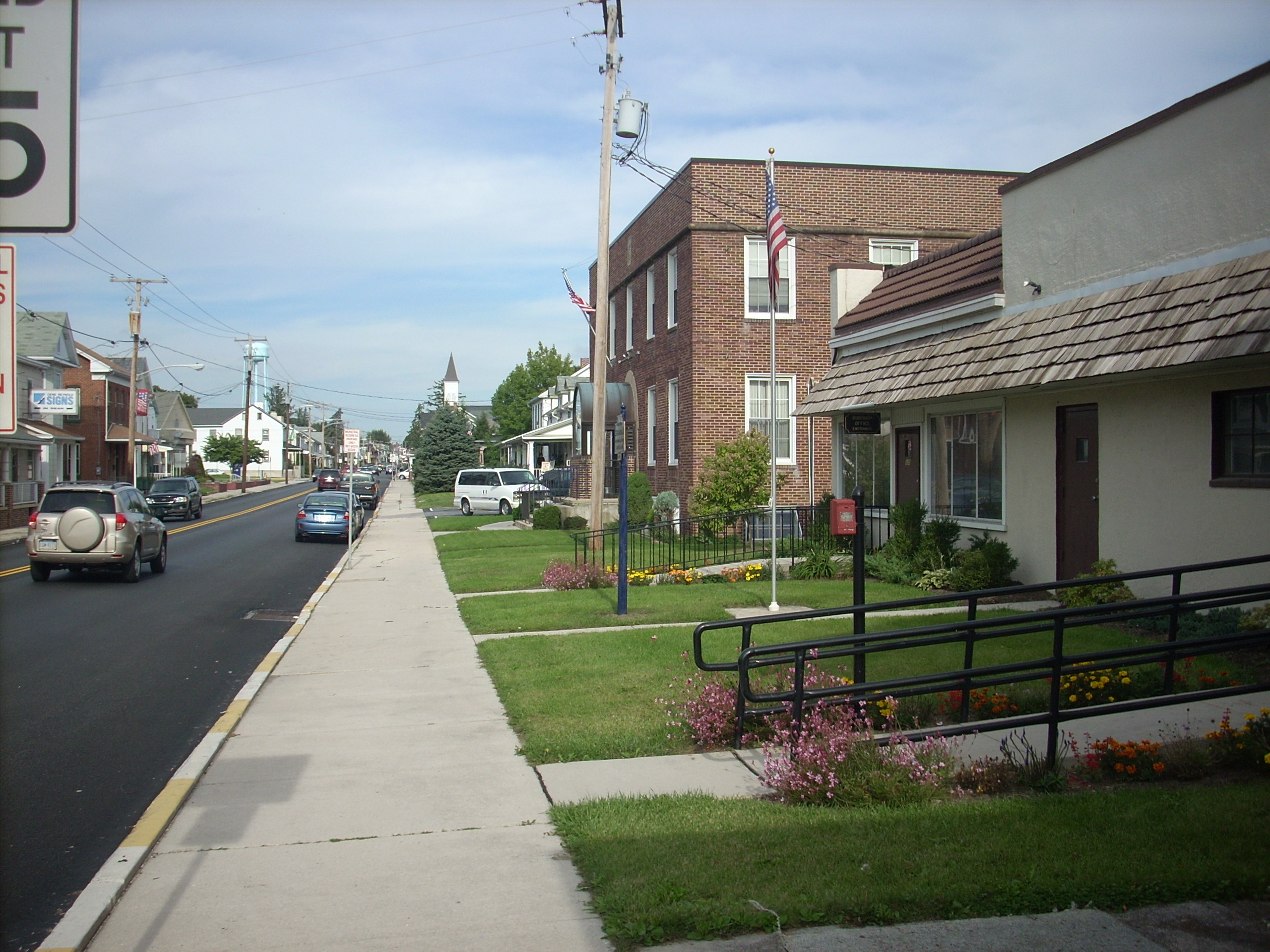
- McSherrystown, Pennsylvania

- Seal

- Location in Adams County and the U.S. state of Pennsylvania.

- Location in Pennsylvania and the United States McSherrystown (the United States)
- Coordinates: 39°48′15″N 77°01′09″W
- Country: United States
- State: Pennsylvania
- County: Adams
- Settled: 1765
- Incorporated: 1882

Government
  - Type: Borough Council
  - Mayor: Catherine Hagerman

Area
  - Total: 0.51 sq mi (1.33 km^{2})
  - Land: 0.51 sq mi (1.33 km^{2})
  - Water: 0 sq mi (0.00 km^{2})
- Elevation: 587 ft (179 m)

Population (2020)
  - Total: 3,077
  - Density: 6,012.8/sq mi (2,321.57/km^{2})
- Time zone: UTC-5 (Eastern (EST))
  - Summer (DST): UTC-4 (EDT)
- Zip code: 17344
- Area code: 717
- FIPS code: 42-46376
- Website: http://www.mcsherrystownboro.org/

McSherrystown is a borough in Adams County, Pennsylvania, United States. The population was 3,077 as of the 2020 census.

McSherrystown was home to the headquarters of Teddy Bear manufacturer Boyds Bears, as well as the oldest operating family-run cigar manufacturer in the U.S. (since 1863), F.X. Smith & Sons. Boyds has since closed down, and in 2018, the cigar company was sold.

== History ==
McSherrystown is the fourth oldest town in Adams County. Its founder, Patrick McSherry (1725–1795), who had family origins stemming from Newry in the south-east of Ulster in the north of Ireland, procured a 300-acre (1.2 km^{2}) tract from the Digges Family in 1763 and proceeded to lay out a number of 5-acre (20,000 m^{2}) lots. The first known deed for one of these lots was dated June 27, 1765. Although McSherry may have intended his effort to be used primarily as outlots for Hanover residents, where they could keep their animals at times and obtain wood, it soon developed into a full-fledged town. McSherry, who lived in Mount Pleasant Township in 1765 and was later tavern-keeper in Littlestown, may never have lived in the town which bears his name.

== Geography ==
McSherrystown is located at 39°48′15″N 77°1′9″W (39.804202, -77.019301).

According to the United States Census Bureau, the borough has a total area of 0.5 square miles (1.3 km^{2}), all land.

== Demographics ==
Historical population
Census	Pop.	Note	%±
1850	206		—
1860	280		35.9%
1870	291		3.9%
1880	439		50.9%
1890	1,020		132.3%
1900	1,490		46.1%
1910	1,724		15.7%
1920	1,800		4.4%
1930	2,050		13.9%
1940	2,128		3.8%
1950	2,510		18.0%
1960	2,839		13.1%
1970	2,773		−2.3%
1980	2,764		−0.3%
1990	2,769		0.2%
2000	2,691		−2.8%
2010	3,038		12.9%
2020	3,077		1.3%

=== 2020 census ===
As of the 2020 census, McSherrystown had a population of 3,077. The median age was 38.5 years. 23.5% of residents were under the age of 18 and 19.0% of residents were 65 years of age or older. For every 100 females there were 88.2 males, and for every 100 females age 18 and over there were 86.9 males age 18 and over.

100.0% of residents lived in urban areas, while 0.0% lived in rural areas.

There were 1,319 households in McSherrystown, of which 29.3% had children under the age of 18 living in them. Of all households, 37.0% were married-couple households, 19.3% were households with a male householder and no spouse or partner present, and 33.0% were households with a female householder and no spouse or partner present. About 34.2% of all households were made up of individuals and 19.7% had someone living alone who was 65 years of age or older.

There were 1,382 housing units, of which 4.6% were vacant. The homeowner vacancy rate was 2.0% and the rental vacancy rate was 3.8%.

Racial composition as of the 2020 census
Race	Number	Percent
White	2,634	85.6%
Black or African American	59	1.9%
American Indian and Alaska Native	3	0.1%
Asian	28	0.9%
Native Hawaiian and Other Pacific Islander	1	0.0%
Some other race	150	4.9%
Two or more races	202	6.6%
Hispanic or Latino (of any race)	292	9.5%

=== 2000 census ===
As of the 2000 census, there were 2,691 people, 1,175 households, and 727 families residing in the borough. The population density was 5,138.7 inhabitants per square mile (1,984.1/km^{2}). There were 1,231 housing units at an average density of 2,350.7 per square mile (907.6/km^{2}). The racial makeup of the borough was 97.88% White, 0.52% African American, 0.22% Native American, 0.19% Asian, 0.04% Pacific Islander, 0.30% from other races, and 0.85% from two or more races. Hispanic or Latino of any race were 1.64% of the population.

There were 1,175 households, out of which 29.0% had children under the age of 18 living with them, 45.7% were married couples living together, 11.7% had a female householder with no husband present, and 38.1% were non-families. 32.0% of all households were made up of individuals, and 15.4% had someone living alone who was 65 years of age or older. The average household size was 2.27 and the average family size was 2.86.

In the borough the population was spread out, with 22.3% under the age of 18, 8.1% from 18 to 24, 31.0% from 25 to 44, 20.4% from 45 to 64, and 18.2% who were 65 years of age or older. The median age was 37 years. For every 100 females there were 86.6 males. For every 100 females age 18 and over, there were 82.4 males.

The median income for a household in the borough was $32,286, and the median income for a family was $40,089. Males had a median income of $33,378 versus $20,784 for females. The per capita income for the borough was $20,158. About 1.4% of families and 6.0% of the population were below the poverty line, including 3.2% of those under age 18 and 6.5% of those age 65 or over.

== Education ==
The borough is in the Conewago Valley School District.
