= Western Maryland K-2 =

Western Maryland K-2 class
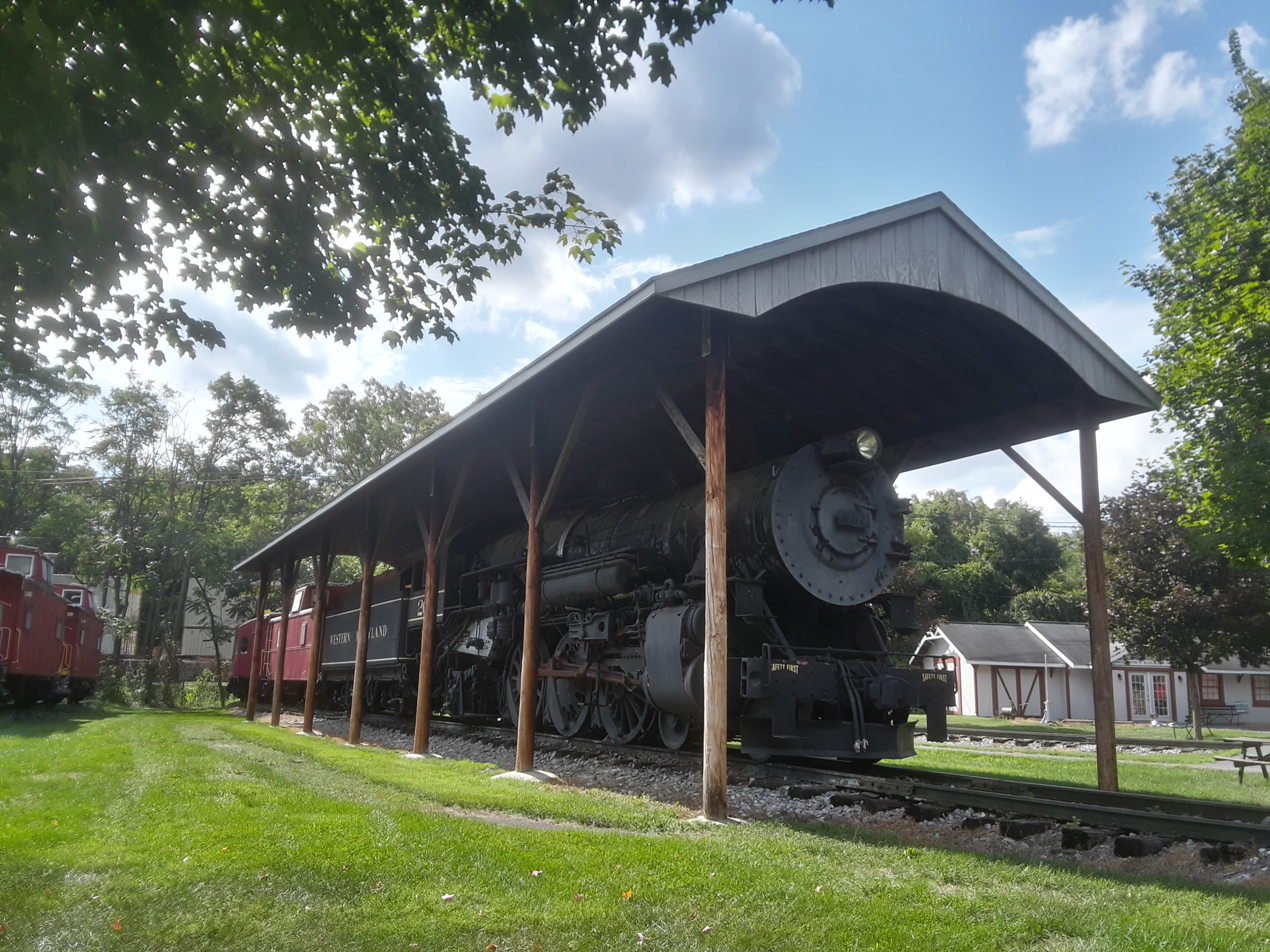
- WM #202 at Hagerstown City Park.
Type and origin
- Power type: Steam
- Builder: Baldwin Locomotive Works
- Serial number: 38075-38078, 38115-38119
- Build date: July-August 1912
- Total produced: 9
Specifications
- Configuration
  - Whyte: 4-6-2
  - UIC: 2′C2′ h1
- Gauge: 4 ft 8 1/2 in (1,435 mm) standard gauge
- Leading dia.: 33 in (838 mm)
- Driver dia.: 69 in (1,753 mm)
- Trailing dia.: 42 in (1,067 mm)
- Minimum curve: 22°
- Wheelbase: Loco & tender: 67.42 ft (20.55 m)
- Length: 103 ft 3 1/8 in (31.47 m)
- Height: 15 ft 0 1/2 in (4.58 m)
- Axle load: 53,500 lb (24,300 kilograms; 24.3 metric tons)
- Adhesive weight: 160,500 lb (72,800 kilograms; 72.8 metric tons)
- Loco weight: 254,300 lb (115,300 kilograms; 115.3 metric tons)
- Tender weight: 148,000 lb (67,000 kilograms; 67 metric tons)
- Total weight: 402,300 lb (182,500 kilograms; 182.5 metric tons)
- Tender type: Vanderbilt, Water-bottom
- Fuel type: Coal, some converted to fuel oil
- Fuel capacity: 3,174 US gal (12,010 L; 2,643 imp gal)
- Water cap.: 8,000 US gal (30,000 L; 6,700 imp gal)
- Firebox
  - Grate area: 61.80 sq ft (5.741 m^{2})
- Boiler pressure: 200 lbf/in^{2} (1.38 MPa)
- Heating surface
  - Firebox: 307 sq ft (28.5 m^{2})
- Superheater
  - Type: Type E
  - Heating area: 755 sq ft (70.1 m^{2})
- Cylinders: Two
- Cylinder size: 24 in × 28 in (610 mm × 711 mm)
- Valve gear: Walschaert; OriginallyBaker
Performance figures
- Maximum speed: 90 mph (140 km/h)
- Tractive effort: 39,736 lbf (176.75 kN)
- Factor of adh.: 4.04
Career
- Operators: Western Maryland
- Class: K-2
- Numbers: 201–209
- Delivered: 1912
- Retired: 1952-1954
- Disposition: One preserved, remainder scrapped

The Western Maryland K-2 was a class of 9 4-6-2 "Pacific" type steam locomotives built by the Baldwin Locomotive Works in 1912 and operated by the Western Maryland Railway until the early 1950s.

They pulled passenger trains until retirement and only one survives, No. 202.

== History ==
When delivered to the Western Maryland, the locomotives were put in passenger service and were put to work on the newly completed Connellsville extension in 1912. They hauled passenger trains between Baltimore, MD, and Chicago, IL, including the first class Chicago Limited and Baltimore Limited. However, they were abandoned by 1917. Despite that, the locomotive would continue to haul passenger trains until the early 1950s. By 1938, all of the K-2s had their Baker valve gear replaced with Walschaert valve gear. In 1947, Nos. 201, 202, 204 and 206 were converted to burn oil to comply with smoke regulations in Baltimore. Following the conversion, the four K-2s would stay east of Cumberland for the rest of their career. Nos. 204 and 205 were eventually used in thaw service to thaw coal in hoppers before they were unloaded into ships at Port Covington, the WM port in Baltimore. Before retirement, No. 204 was considered the belle of the road. As the railroad was dieselising, retirement started in 1952 and by 1954, all of the K-2s have been retired.

== Preservation ==
Only one K-2 has been preserved, No. 202. It was retired in 1952 and in 1953, the Western Maryland had decided to donate it to the children of Hagerstown and place it on display in Hagerstown City Park. Today, it is still on display there. On June 7, 1984, the locomotive was added to the National Register of Historic Places. It is one of only two surviving Western Maryland steam locomotives and the only surviving mainline WM steam locomotive.

== Roster ==
| Number | Baldwin serial number | Date built | Disposition | Notes |
|---|---|---|---|---|
| 201 | 38075 | July 1912 | Sold for scrap. | Converted to burn oil |
| 202 | 38076 | July 1912 | Retired 1952, on display in City Park, Hagerstown, Maryland. | Converted to burn oil. On the National Register of Historic Places. |
| 203 | 38077 | July 1912 | Sold for scrap. | |
| 204 | 38078 | July 1912 | Sold for scrap. | Converted to burn oil. |
| 205 | 38115 | August 1912 | Scrapped 1955 or 1956. | |
| 206 | 38116 | August 1912 | Sold for scrap. | Converted to burn oil. |
| 207 | 38117 | August 1912 | Sold for scrap. | All driving wheels converted to Baldwin Disc. |
| 208 | 38118 | August 1912 | Sold for scrap. | |
| 209 | 38119 | August 1912 | Sold for scrap. | |
