= Hagerstown City Park Train Hub =

- Exterior of the museum in 2026
- Former name: Hagerstown Railroad Museum
- Established: May 21, 2005
- Location: Hagerstown, Maryland, U.S.
- Type: Railroad museum
- Founder: John E. Long
- Historian: Chris Niklewski
- Website: www.hagerstownmd.org/310/City-Park-Train-Hub

The Hagerstown City Park Train Hub is a museum site within Hagerstown City Park in the state of Maryland. It focuses on the history of railroading in Hagerstown. It is home to Western Maryland 202, the last surviving Western Maryland K-2 Pacific type steam engine. A playground and rental pavilion are also provided on the site. Events and programs are held at the site through the Hagerstown Parks and Recreation department.

The 202 from the right angle, November 2026

The 202 in America 250th celebratory gear, November 2026

== History ==
In 1953, the Western Maryland Railway Company donated locomotive 202 to the city of Hagerstown, dedicating the engine to the "children of Hagerstown." The engine was brought to City Park, where engineers from Western Maryland would provide maintenance until 1975, soon after the company was absorbed into Chessie System. The 202 was purchased in trust with the City of Hagerstown by John Edward Long in October 1982 to continue maintenance. This arrangement remained in place until Long's death in 2006.

Long would spent the next twenty-three years refurbishing the 202 and purchasing artifacts for a new museum, including several cabooses. On May 21, 2005, the Hagerstown Railroad Museum opened to the public. Long put an estimated $50,000 of his own money into building the museum, and waved a salary from the City of Hagerstown.

The museum was renamed to the Hagerstown City Park Train Hub in 2018 as part of a rebranding. A large pavilion and train-shaped playground was added to the site during this remodel. A grand reopening of the site occurred on June 12, 2021. The site operates on a seasonal schedule and hosts several annual events, including Touch a Truck and Train Day and Fall Fest.

The site's rental accommodations, November 2026

== Notable rolling stock ==
Besides the Western Maryland 202, the Train Hub also hosts a number of cabooses.

Caboose	Designation
Exterior of caboose, located in Hagerstown City Park Train Hub, November 2026	Western Maryland 1885
Painted in WMR colors, located at Hagerstown City Park Train Hub, November 2026	C&O 900282
Painted in WMR colors, located in Hagerstown City Park Train Hub, November 2026	SCL/L&S [number unknown]
Exterior of the caboose, located in Hagerstown City Park Train Hub, November 2026	Western Maryland 1850
Exterior of the caboose, located in Hagerstown City Park Train Hub, November 2026	Western Maryland 1865
painted in WMR colors, November 2026	Wabash [number unknown]
