= Western Maryland 202 =

Preserved and listed American 4-6-2 locomotive

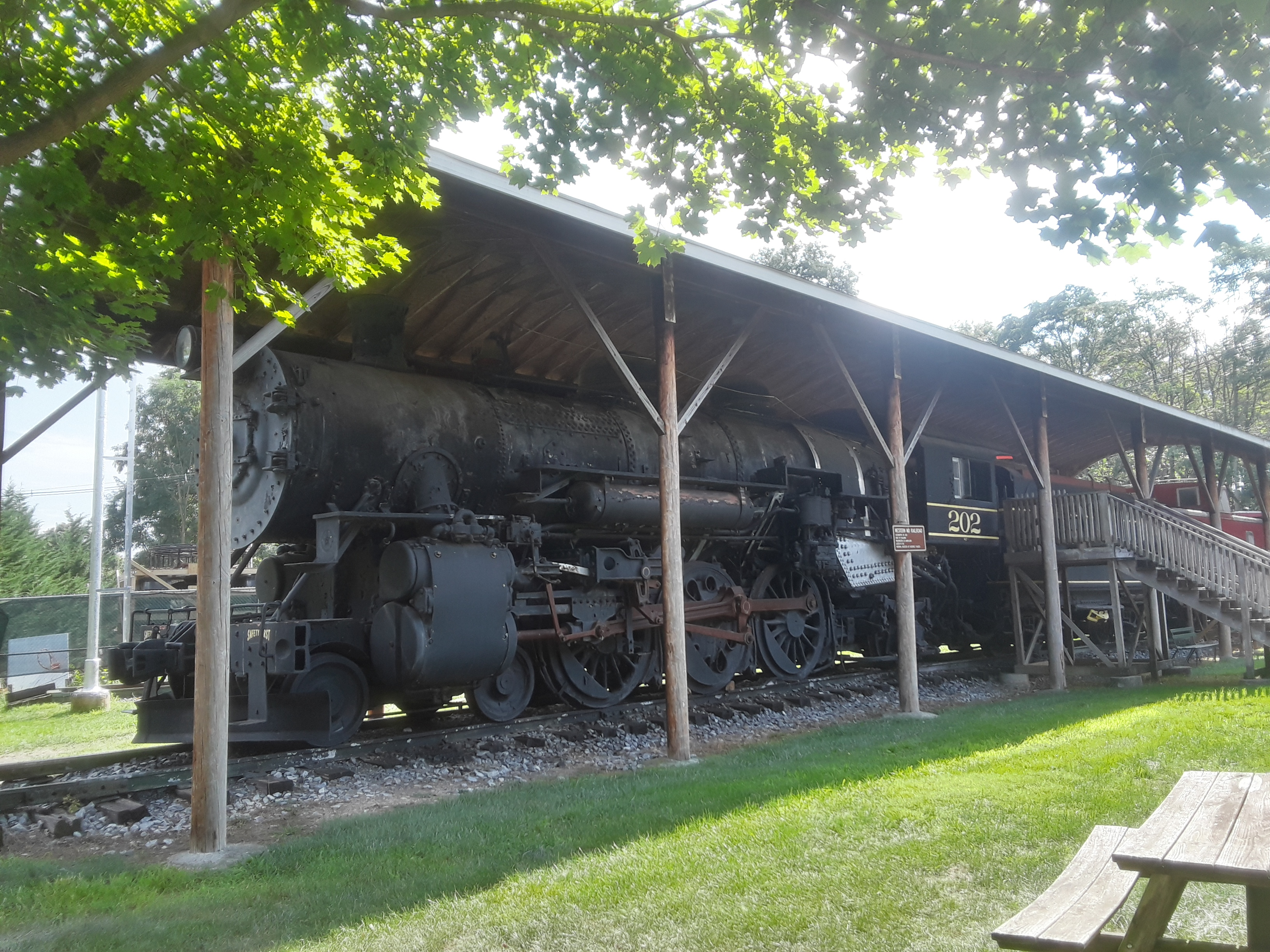
- WM No. 202 on display at the Hagerstown City Park in August 2020
Type and origin
- Power type: Steam
- Builder: Baldwin Locomotive Works
- Serial number: 38076
- Build date: July 1912
- Rebuild date: 1947
Specifications
- Configuration
  - Whyte: 4-6-2
- Gauge: 4 ft 8 1/2 in (1,435 mm)
- Leading dia.: 33 in (838 mm)
- Driver dia.: 69 in (1,753 mm)
- Trailing dia.: 42 in (1,067 mm)
- Minimum curve: 22°
- Wheelbase: Loco & tender: 67.42 ft (20.55 m)
- Height: 15 ft 0 1/2 in (4.58 m)
- Axle load: 53,500 lb (20 t)
- Adhesive weight: 160,500 lb (70 t)
- Loco weight: 254,300 lb (120 t)
- Tender weight: 148,000 lb (70 t)
- Total weight: 402,300 lb (180 t)
- Fuel type: New: Coal; Now: Oil
- Fuel capacity: 3,174 US gal (12,010 L; 2,643 imp gal)
- Water cap.: 8,000 US gal (30,000 L; 6,700 imp gal)
- Firebox
  - Grate area: 61.80 sq ft (5.741 m^{2})
- Boiler pressure: 200 lbf/in^{2} (1.38 MPa)
- Heating surface
  - Firebox: 307 sq ft (28.5 m^{2})
- Superheater
  - Heating area: 755 sq ft (70.1 m^{2})
- Cylinder size: 24 in × 28 in (610 mm × 711 mm)
- Valve gear: Walschaert
- Valve type: Piston valves
- Loco brake: Air
- Train brakes: Air
- Couplers: Knuckle
Performance figures
- Tractive effort: 39,736 lbf (176.75 kN)
- Factor of adh.: 4.04
Career
- Operators: Western Maryland Railway
- Class: K-2
- Number in class: 2nd of 9
- Numbers: WM 202
- Delivered: 1912
- Retired: 1952
- Restored: 2008 (cosmetically)
- Current owner: City of Hagerstown
- Disposition: On static display
- Western Maryland Railway Steam Locomotive No. 202
- U.S. National Register of Historic Places
- Location within Maryland Location within the United States
- Coordinates: 39°38′6″N 77°44′6″W
- Area: less than one acre
- Architectural style: K-2 Pacific
- NRHP reference No.: 84001884
- Added to NRHP: June 7, 1984

Western Maryland Railway 202 is a preserved K-2 class 4-6-2 "Pacific" steam locomotive built in July 1912 by the Baldwin Locomotive Works (BLW) for the Western Maryland Railway (WM). The locomotive was used for pulling various passenger trains of the WM over the course of 40 years. In 1938, the locomotive was refitted with Walschaert valve gear, replacing its original Baker valve gear. In 1947, it was converted to burn oil and stayed east of Cumberland after the conversion. No. 202 pulled its last revenue freight assignment in 1952, and it was subsequently retired and donated to the city of Hagerstown, to be displayed in City Park, Hagerstown, Maryland. It is one of only two surviving Western Maryland steam locomotives and the only surviving mainline WM steam locomotive.

No. 202 was listed on the National Register of Historic Places in 1984. It spent so much time being exposed to the elements and vandals, that it was cosmetically restored in 2008 for a cleaner appearance. In late 2024, the Hagerstown government have considered to donate No. 202 to the Western Maryland Scenic Railroad (WMSR). In late August 2025, the Hagerstown government decided to rescind their decision to donate the locomotive due to pressure from a local group protesting the locomotive's relocation. As a result, the locomotive will continue to remain in Hagerstown.

== See also ==
- Hagerstown City Park
- Hagerstown City Park Train Hub
