= Jonathan Hager =

Founder of Hagerstown, Maryland, US

Jonathan Hager (May 3, 1714– November 6, 1775) was the founder of Hagerstown, Maryland, United States. He was born in Germany and fought in the French and Indian War serving out of Fort Frederick.

== History ==
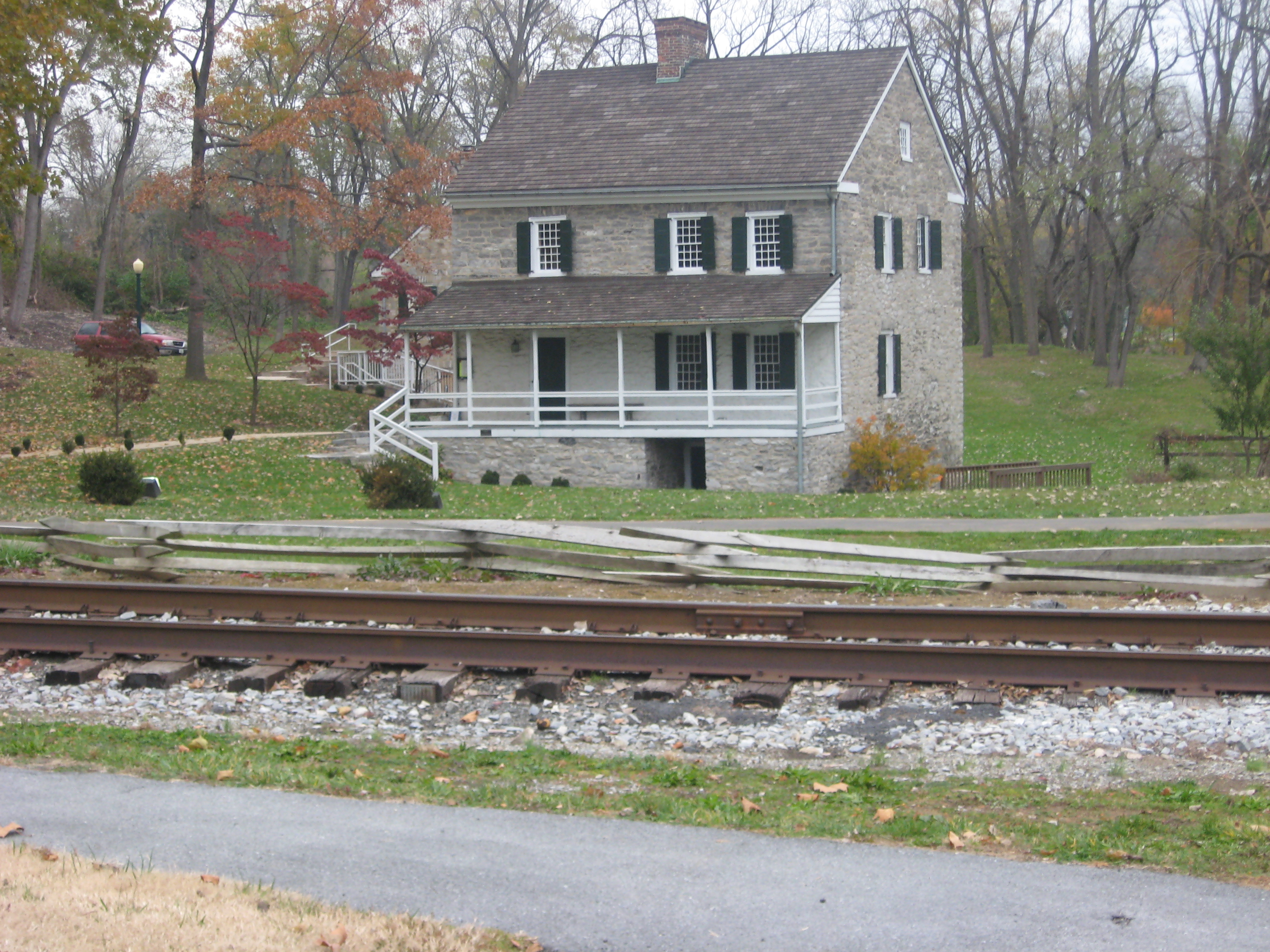
The Hager House and Museum in Hagerstown City Park was once home to the city's founder, Jonathan Hager.

Little information has been learned and proven about Jonathan Hager's early childhood, education, and other aspects of his early life. Information that has been verified by multiple sources is as follows: Jonathan Hager came to the American colonies in 1736 and arrived at a port in Philadelphia, Pennsylvania. After a three tract through Pennsylvania and Maryland, he decided to settle in Maryland. On 5 June 1739, he bought 200 acres (0.81 km^{2}) from Daniel Dulaney and began immediate construction on the grounds. He built a sound foundation over two fresh water springs that flowed over the property and constructed a barn. The house and grounds became known as "Hager's Fancy," now encompassing the site known as the Hager House and Museum (in present-day Hagerstown City Park). Jonathan Hager, 26, wed Elizabeth Kirschner, 15, in 1740. The couple resided in "Hager's Fancy" for only five years.

Jonathan sold the property to Jacob Rohrer and relocated to another property he had obtained. This new location, named "Hager's Delight" is thought to be the location where his children were born, though it is around this time that Jonathan Hager began using a townhome directly in Elizabethtown. Jonathan and Elizabeth had three children, although only two survived into adulthood. The two surviving children were Rosanna Hager (1752) and Jonathan Hager Jr. (1755). Elizabeth died in 1765 at the age of 40. Hager recorded in his Book of Sermons: "We lived together until the 16th day of April, 1765, then it pleased the Lord to call her, after severe suffering, out of this world. What God does is well done." As a tribute to his wife, Jonathan named the area Elizabethtown.

In 1762, Hager officially founded the town which he named after his wife. The name Elizabethtown soon gave way to Hager's Town and both names were used until 1813. On December 5, 1813, the City Council voted to change the name from Elizabethtown to Hagerstown, then on January 26, 1814, the State Legislature passed an act to officially call the town Hagerstown.

In 1776, Jonathan Hager became known as the "Father of Washington County" after his many efforts finally secured Hagerstown becoming the county seat of newly created Washington County, Maryland which Hager had also helped create from neighboring Frederick County.

== See also ==
- Hager House
- Hagerstown City Park
- Hagerstown, Maryland
- Washington County, Maryland
