= Hager House (Hagerstown, Maryland) =

Historic house in Maryland, United States

- U.S. National Register of Historic Places
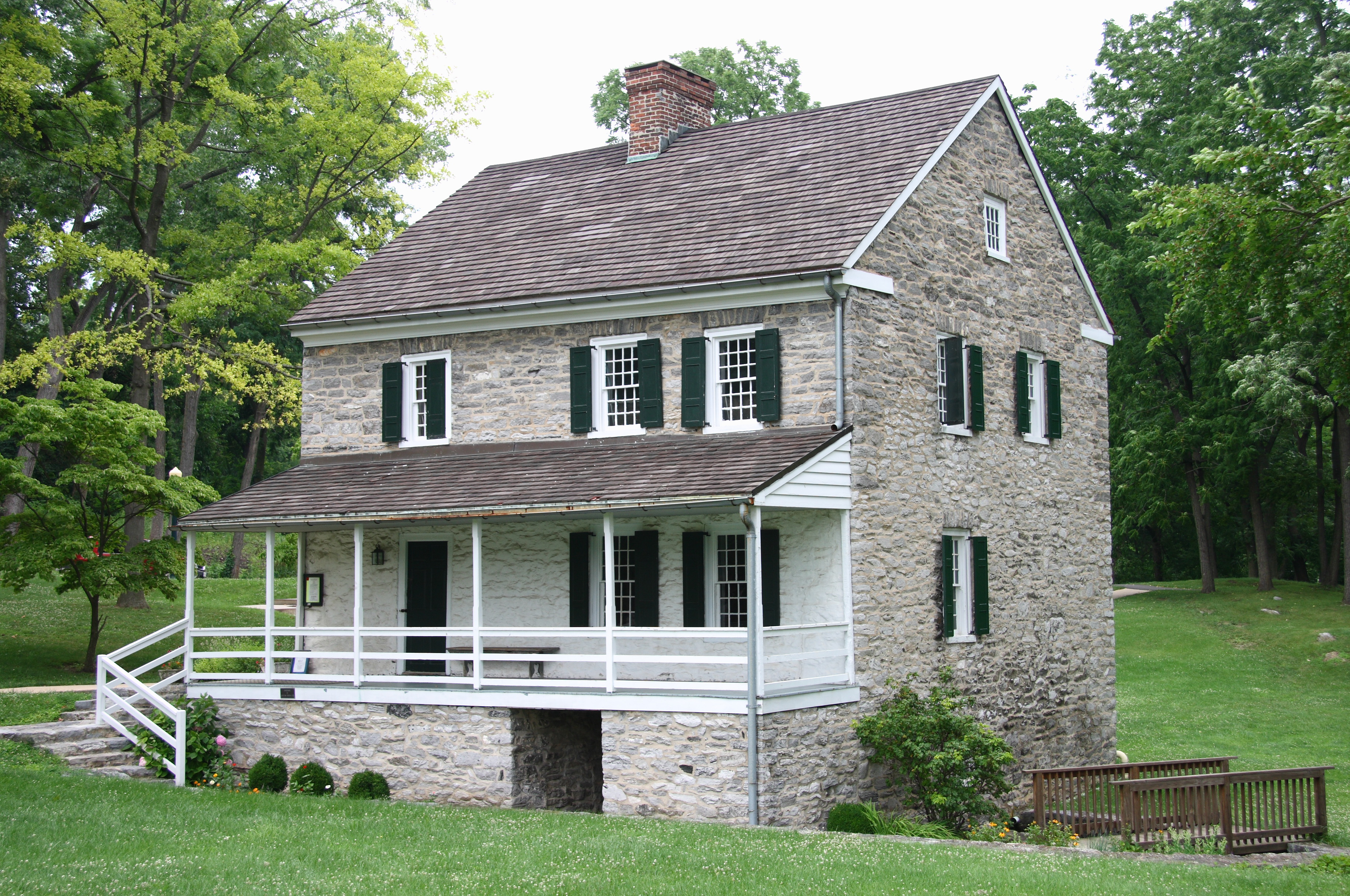

- Location within Maryland Location within the United States
- Location: Hagerstown, Maryland
- Coordinates: 39°38′22″N 77°43′50″W
- Area: 2 acres (0.81 ha)
- Built: c. 1740
- Built by: Hager, Jonathan
- NRHP reference No.: 74000974
- Added to NRHP: November 5, 1974

The Hager House is a two-story stone house in Hagerstown, Maryland, United States that dates to c. 1740. The house was built by Jonathan Hager, a German immigrant from Westphalia, who founded Hagerstown. The basement contains two spring-fed pools of water, providing a secure water source. Hager sold the property, then known as Hager's Fancy to Jacob Rohrer. The house remained in the Rohrer family until 1944, when it was acquired by the Washington County Historical Society. The restored house was given to the City of Hagerstown in 1954 and opened to the public in 1962 as a historic house museum.

The Hager House is located off Key Street in Hagerstown City Park, and is open for visits from April through December. Tours, on the hour, go from 10am to 4pm. The Hager House is the site of many activities throughout the year as well, including annual Fall Fest, Doll House Tours, Ghost Tours, and Archaeological Dig-It Tours.

== History ==
On June 5, 1739, Jonathan Hager purchased 200 acres of land in the Great Appalachian Valley between the Blue Ridge and Allegheny Mountains in Maryland. This land is now part of Hagerstown City Park and downtown Hagerstown. Hager built the flagstone house on top of two freshwater springs and named the property, Hager's Fancy. The house was added to the National Historic Registry in 1974.

=== Structure ===
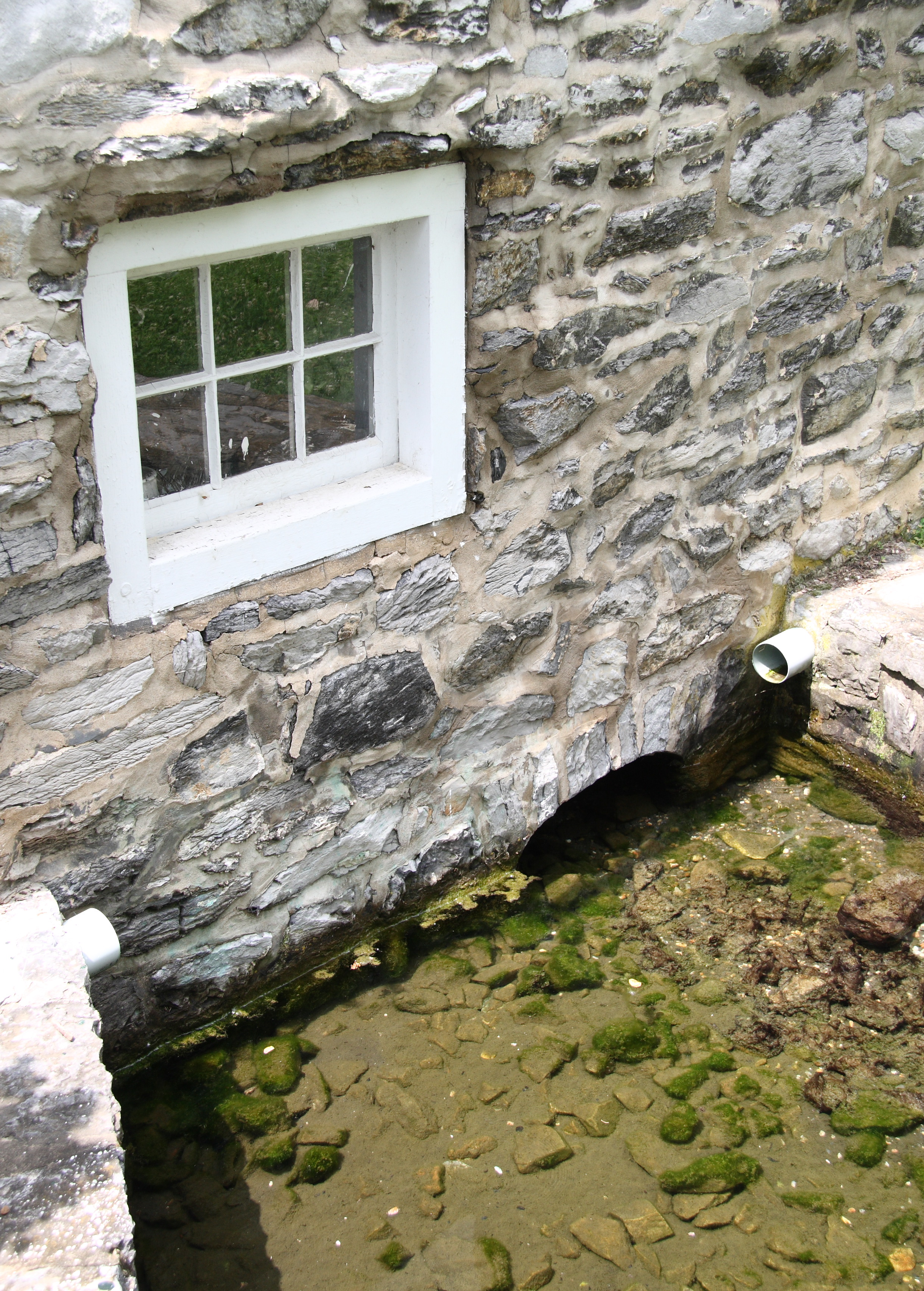
Spring outflow at Hager House

The Hager House is built in a German Colonial style with a single chimney in the middle of the house. The central chimney allowed more heat to fill the home, rather than escape through the outside walls like an English Colonial. In the summer, if the kitchen fireplace radiated too much heat, families used the Summer Kitchen located in the much cooler basement. The house rests atop two freshwater springs that naturally run 40 degrees Fahrenheit throughout the year. The springs not only regulated the room's temperature, but also served as drinking water and preserved food like a modern-day refrigerator. Near the springs, the fireplace served many uses as well. While it was used to cook in the summer, the rest of the time Hager likely would have used it for blacksmithing. The walls of the basement are constructed of 17-inch thick stone, offering protection from attacks and the elements. Separating the springs from the other half of the basement is a large wall with an embrasure used for protection. This embrasure, similar to a medieval castle's arrowslit, could be used to attack an incoming intruder while keeping Hager out of site. This other half of the basement was used to store animals in bad weather or come winter time. It kept the animals safe, and their body heat helped heat the home. The animals were brought in through a large Double Dutch Door. The top half of the door could be left open for light or fresh air. To enter the basement without using the double Dutch door, there once was a trapdoor in the kitchen. The modern-day Hager House now has stairs that come from the former pantry. The first floor is divided into four rooms: the kitchen, parlor, hall, and trading post. Upstairs, the hall leads to two rooms, with a third branching off the Master Bedroom. This room eventually was used for children or girls of the home, so that they could be under their parents' constant watch. Finally, another staircase leads to an attic, which was once used as a bedroom by renters of the home. Outside there once was a barn, but it was torn down during renovation on the property. Now a Museum, with a small upstairs residence, stands in its place.
