= Washington County Museum of Fine Arts =

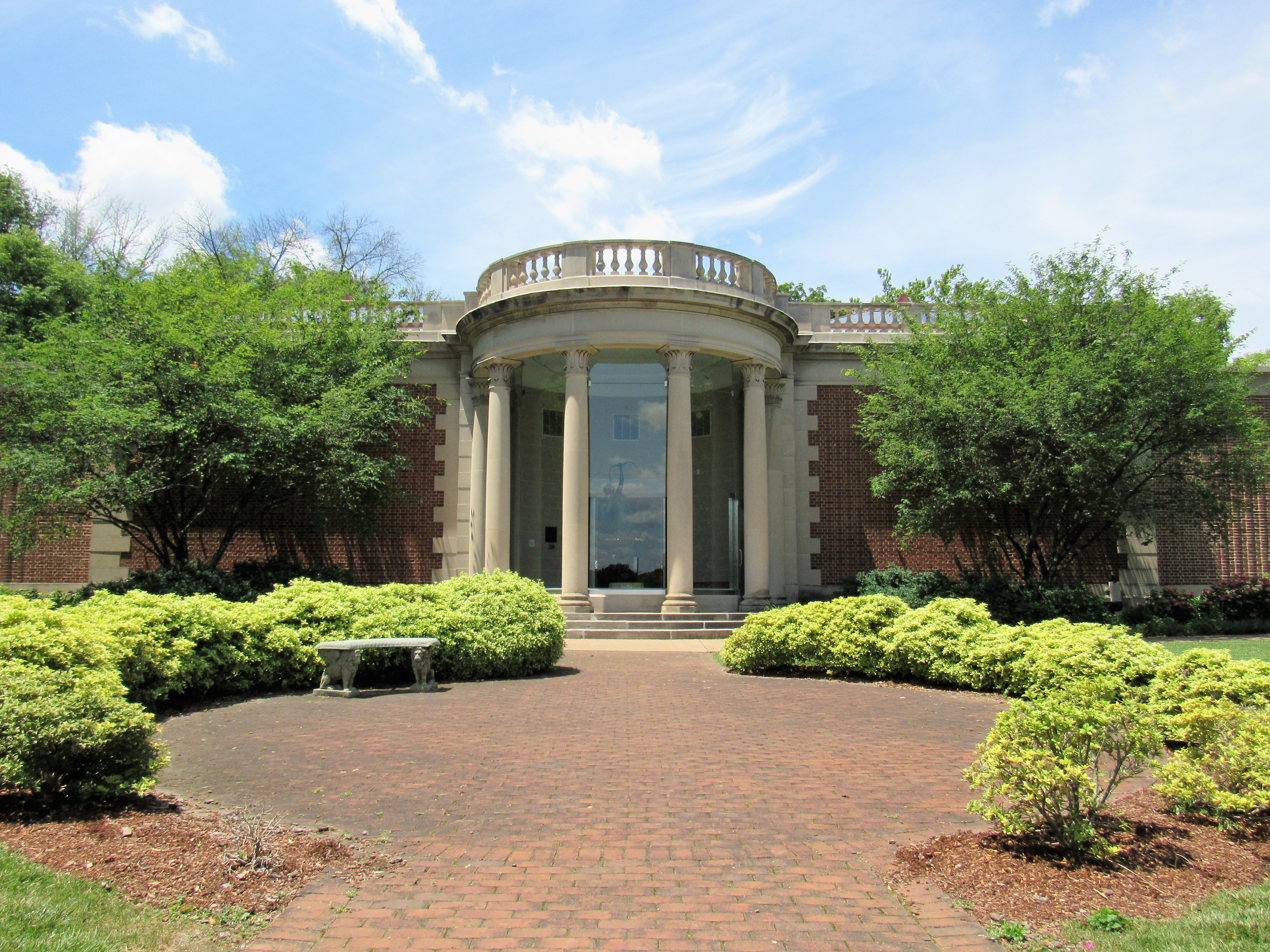
- Washington County Museum of Fine Arts in Hagerstown City Park.
- Established: 1929
- Location: 401 Museum Drive, Hagerstown (City Park), MD 21740; United States
- Coordinates: 39.6370°N 77.7316°W
- Type: Art center, Art museum
- Visitors: 50,000
- Director: Sarah J. Hall
- Curators: Linda Johnson, PhD (wcmfa.org)
- Website: www.wcmfa.org

Washington County Museum of Fine Arts (WCMFA) is an art museum located in Hagerstown, Maryland, United States. The building is located off Park Circle and serves as a centerpiece in Hagerstown City Park. The museum was donated in 1929, by Mr. and Mrs. William Singer, Jr. It was completed in 1931, and two wings were added in 1949. The museum provides residents and visitors with access to a nationally recognized permanent collection and a rotating schedule of exhibitions, musical concerts, lectures, films, art classes and special events for children and adults throughout the year. The collections include 19th & early 20th Century American Art, Old Masters, and Decorative art.

Washington County Museum of Fine Arts has no entrance fee, and relies on public and private donations. The museum is accredited by the American Alliance of Museums (AAM).

== History of the museum ==
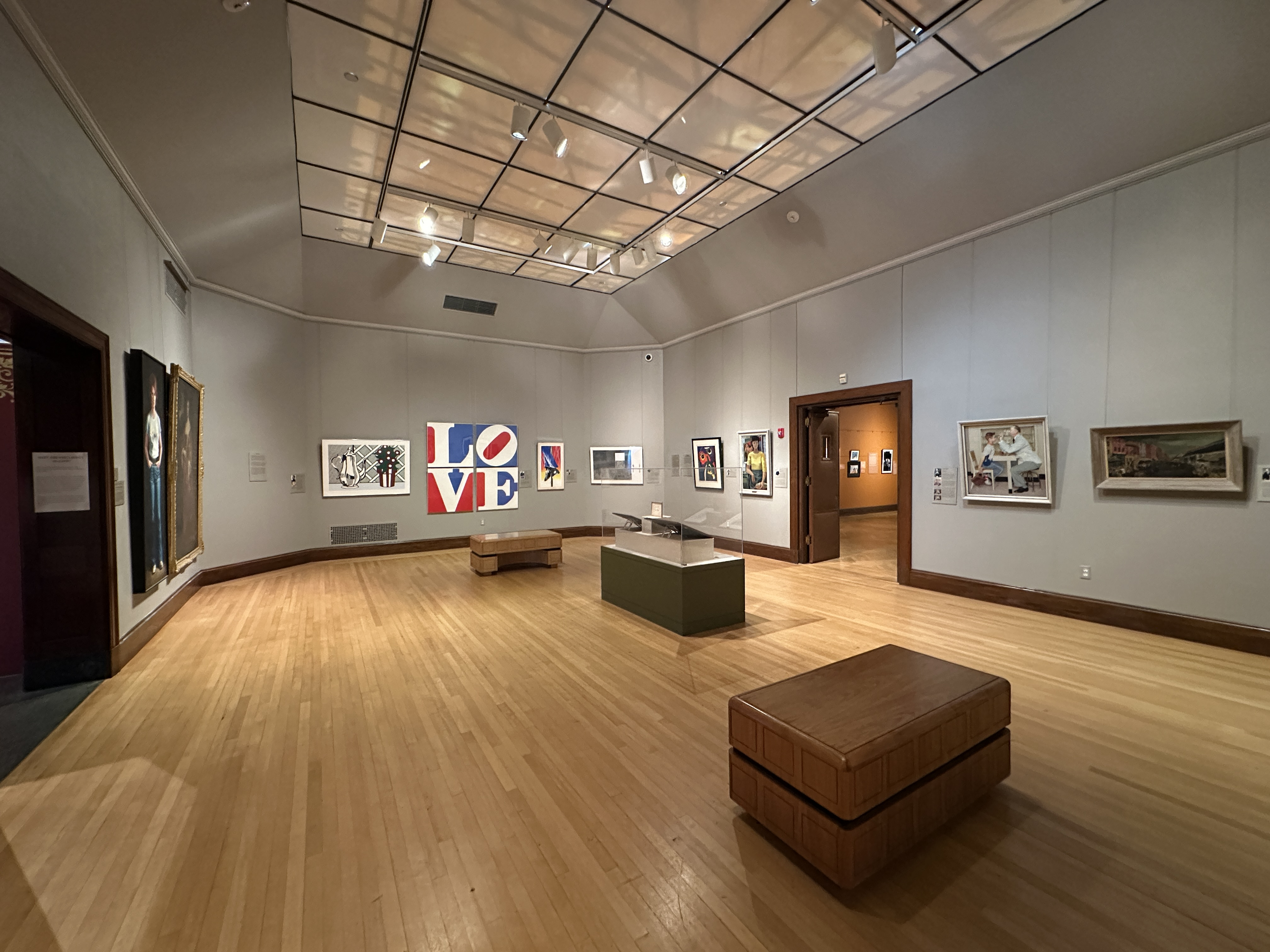
Kerstein Gallery

The New York architectural firm of Hyde & Shepherd designed the original building for the Washington County Museum of Fine Arts. Built in the neo-Georgian style, the building is red brick trimmed with local limestone. The original facade features the museum's name inscribed in large capitals flanked by rosettes. Inset in the rooftop balustrade, a panel showing an artist's palette further denotes the building's use. Founder Anna Singer frequently referred to the original structure as the “first unit” of the building. She followed through with this plan for enlargement with her 1946 offer to fund two new wings, which were completed in 1949. A later addition, begun in 1994, formed an open courtyard around the original entrance. The cornerstone was placed on July 15, 1930, and the museum opened its doors to the public on September 16, 1931. Since then, the museum's collection has grown to over 6,000 art objects.

== Founders ==
While the artist, William Henry Singer, Jr., and his wife, Anna Brugh Singer, lived most of their lives in Europe, the couple bestowed a rare legacy on the people of Washington County. In 1931, the Singers gave the Museum of Fine Arts to the community along with a substantial collection of American and European art. The gift was motivated by Anna's deep affection towards her hometown of Hagerstown. The couple continued to make gifts to the museum throughout their lives. In 1949, Anna greatly expanded the original museum with the addition of two wings given as a memorial to her late husband.

The Singers traveled throughout the United States and Europe, making friends with artists and gaining exposure to the artistic world. William was an American post-impressionist painter influenced by the European atheistic crosscurrents of the late 19th century, and the son of a Pittsburgh steel magnate. Singer's mature work concentrated almost exclusively on the isolated mountains and fjords of Norway, a country that he adopted almost as a homeland. His major achievement was an interpretation of the majestic scenery of Norway. Anna was clearly the more outgoing of the pair. She spent much of her time entertaining guests at the couple's Dutch and Norwegian homes and developing the couple's collection of artwork. Apart from founding the Washington County Museum of Fine Arts, the couple made numerous philanthropic gifts to churches, towns, and hospitals in Norway, the Netherlands, and the United States. After William's death in 1943, Anna turned much of her attention to finding suitable homes for the objects in their collection and supporting art institutions. In 1956, she founded the Singer Laren Museum and theater in Laren, the Netherlands, and remained an enthusiastic supporter of the visual and performing arts until her own death in 1962.

== Collection ==
The strength of the museum's collection has always been in 18th and early 20th Century art with paintings from such artists as Benjamin West and Thomas Sully. The American landscape tradition is represented with works by Thomas Cole, Thomas Moran, Frederic Edwin Church, Jasper Cropsey, Albert Bierstadt, George Inness, John Frederick Kensett and other members of the Hudson River School. Classic works by American impressionists Childe Hassam and Willard Leroy Metcalf, came into the collection through William and Anna Singer's friendships with these artists. The Ashcan School has excellent examples of paintings by George Luks, Robert Henri, William Merritt Chase, Arthur B. Davies, and Eduard Steichen. A small but significant group of European, Asian, and African art is complemented by Art Deco glass by Tiffany and Lalique. Contemporary and early American art and the pottery of the eccentric George Ohr fill out the WCMFA's diverse collection.

Along with American Decorative and Folk art, the museum has always been interested in Maryland art, and its collection includes portraits by the Charles Willson Peale family of painters, including Rembrandt Peale and Sarah Miriam Peale. European Old Masters such as Saints Mary Magdalene and Paul by Giovanni Mazone and Jusepe de Ribera are hung in the museum's Schrieber Gallery. The Singers acquired an important group of thirteen works by French sculptor, Auguste Rodin, including his Saint John the Baptist in Amsterdam in 1931. At the same time, Anna Singer acquired a study of Abraham Lincoln for Mount Rushmore by Gutzon Borglum. Since Anna's death, the museum has continued to collect 20th-century and contemporary art, and owns significant works by Milton Avery, Philip Guston, Frank Stella, Helen Frankenthaler, Grace Hartigan, Robert Indiana, and Emily Clayton Bishop. The museum purchased At the Optometrist, also known as The Oculist, from Norman Rockwell himself.

The stained glass panel in the rotunda of the museum was added by local artisan Robert Martin in 1999.

== Selected works ==
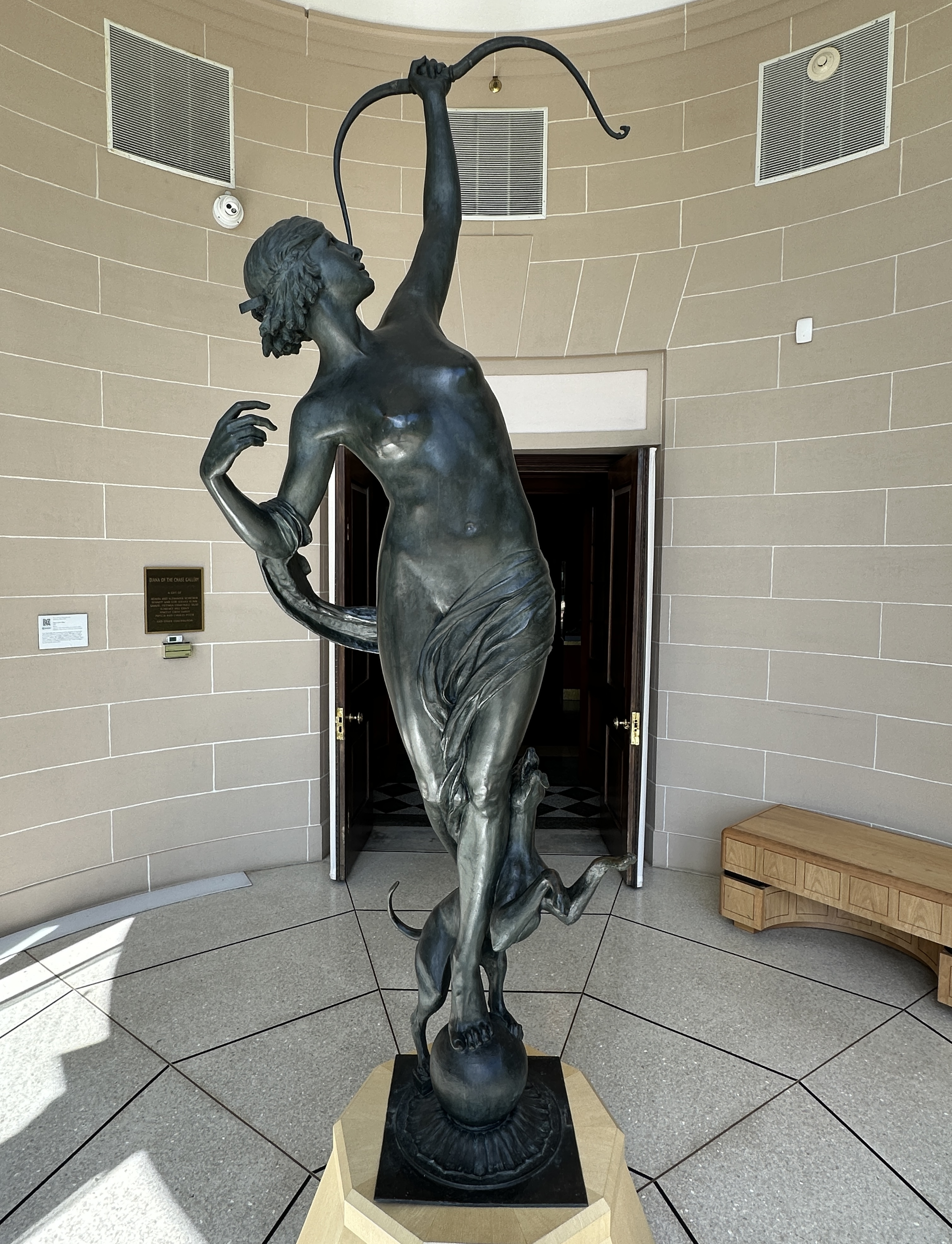
Diana of the Chase (1922), Anna Hyatt Huntington

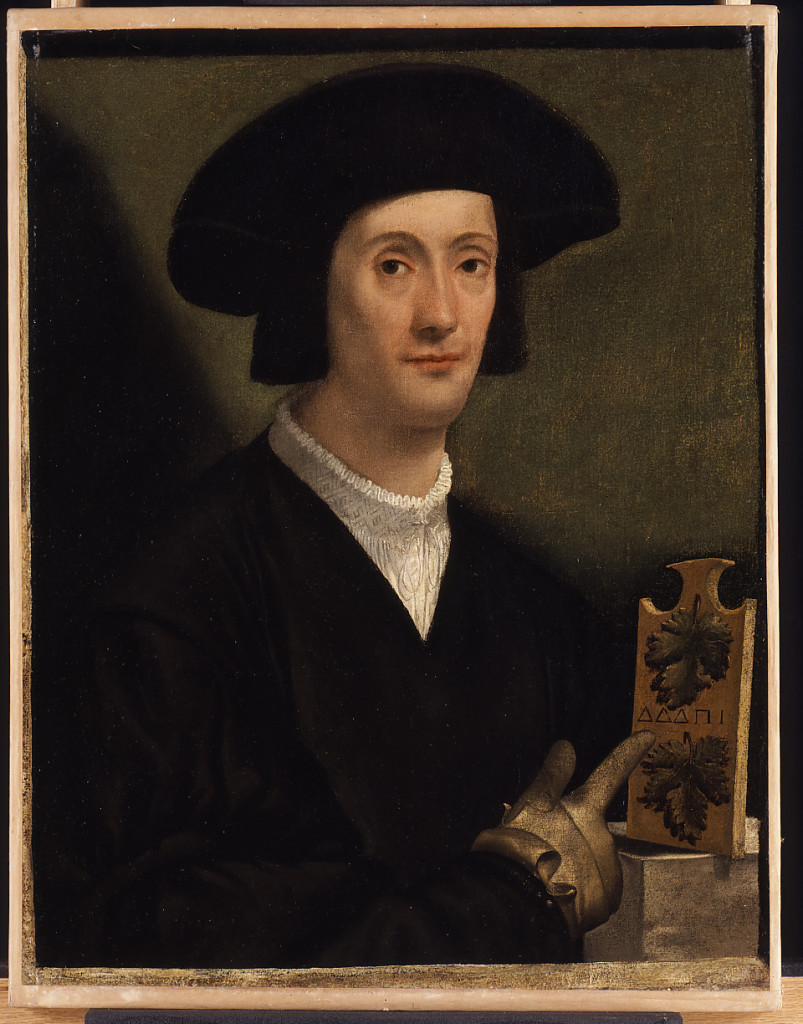
Self-portrait (1509), Timoteo Viti

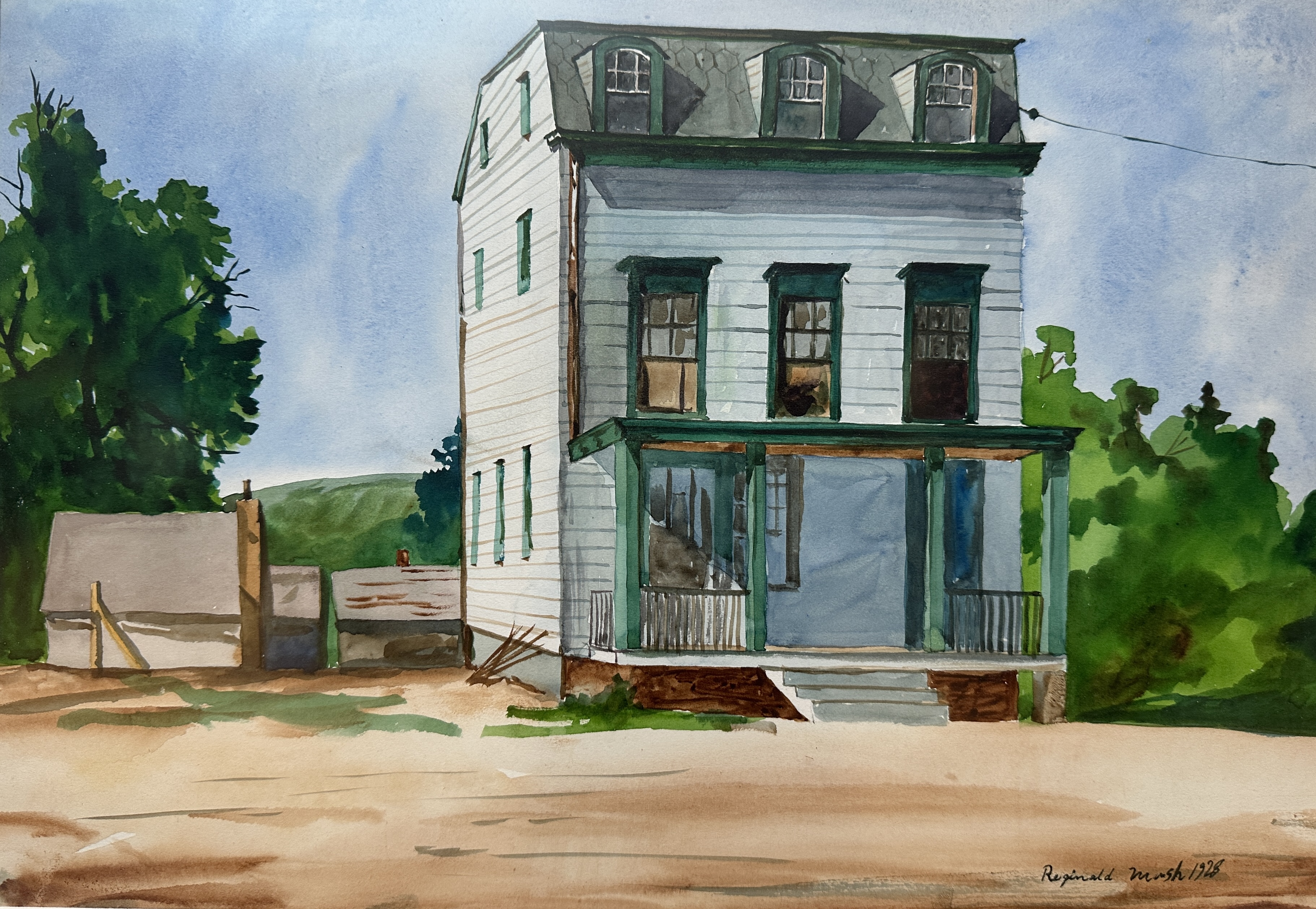
The Green House (1920s), Reginald Marsh

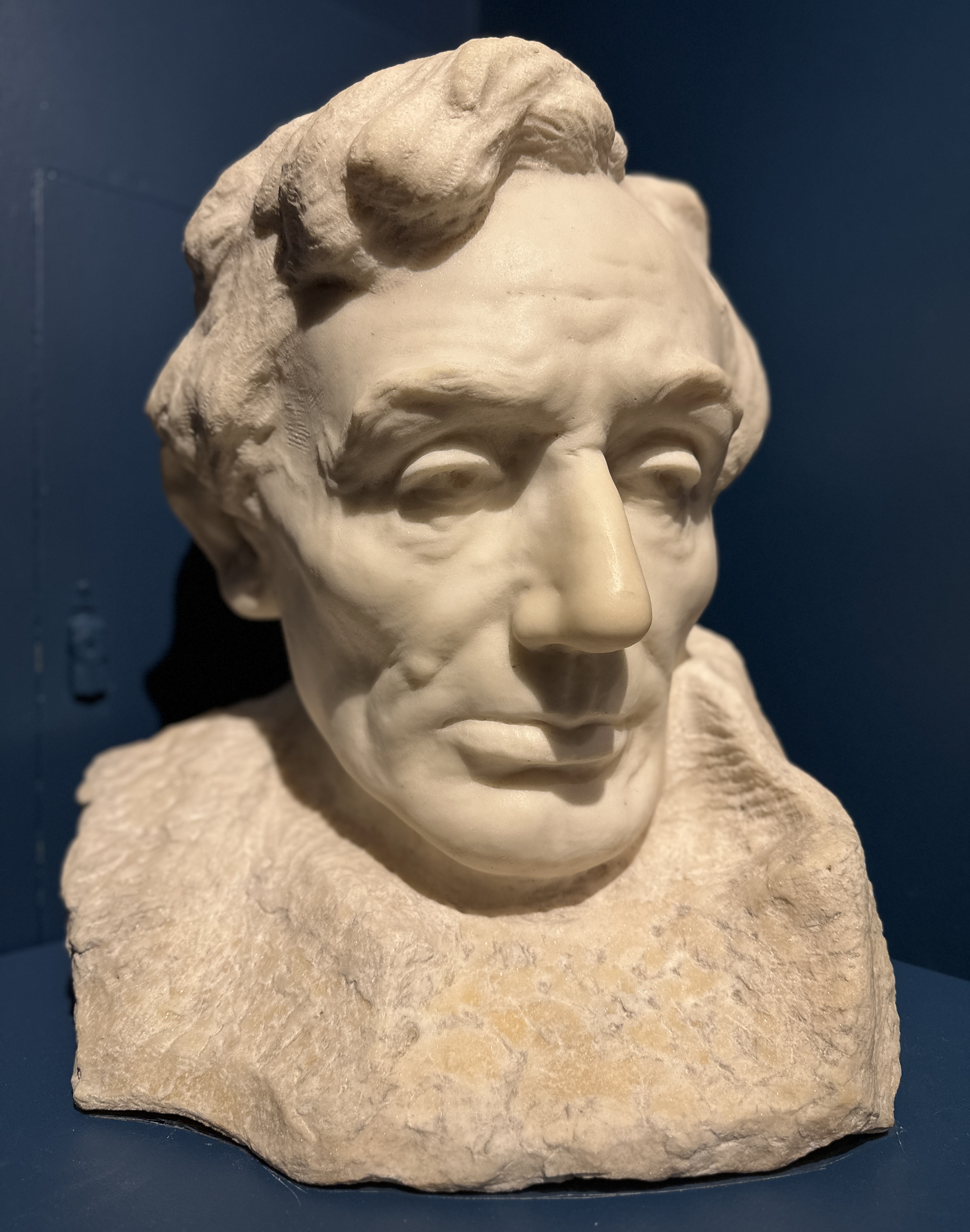
Abraham Lincoln (1930), Gutzon Borglum

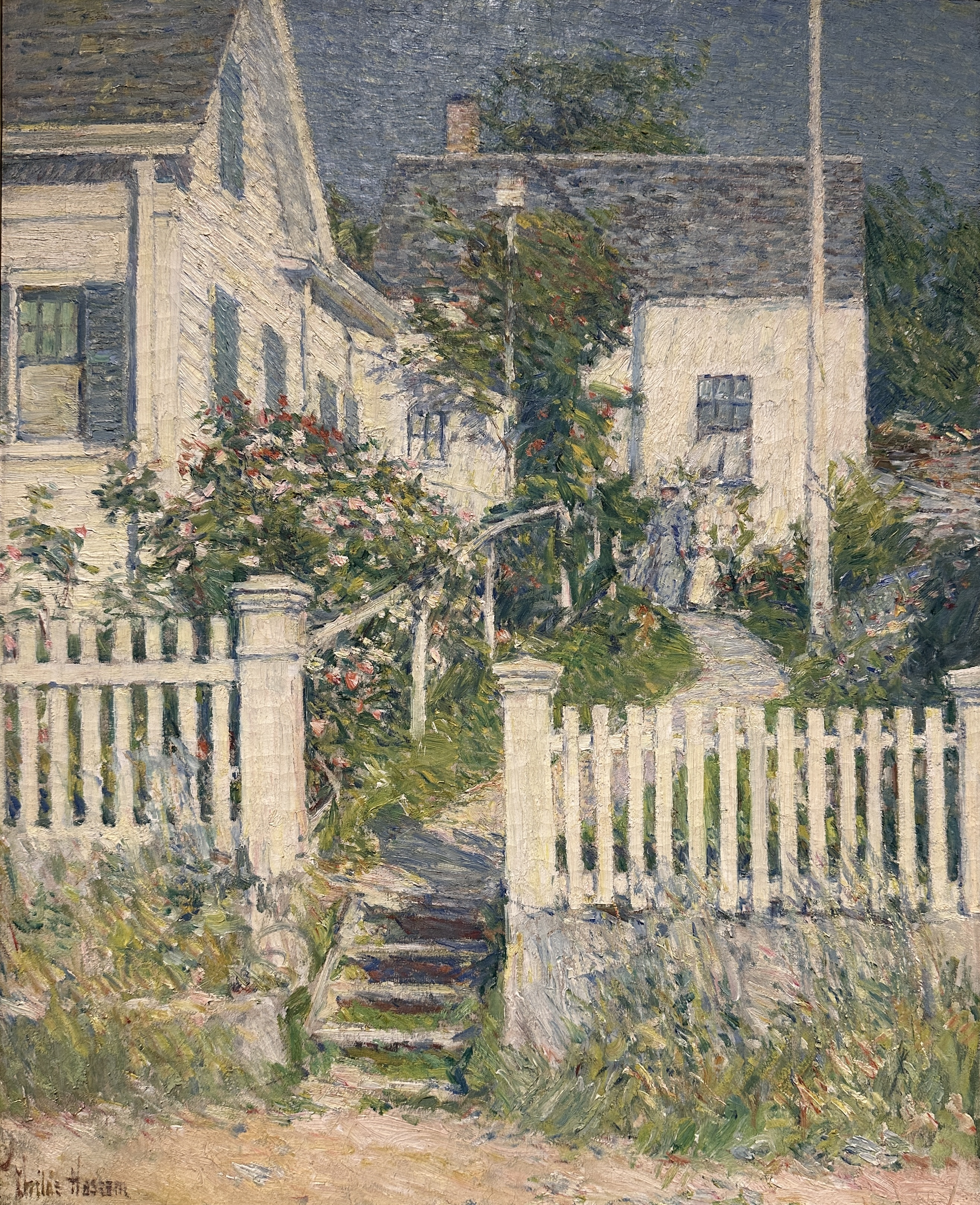
White House, Gloucester (1895), Childe Hassam

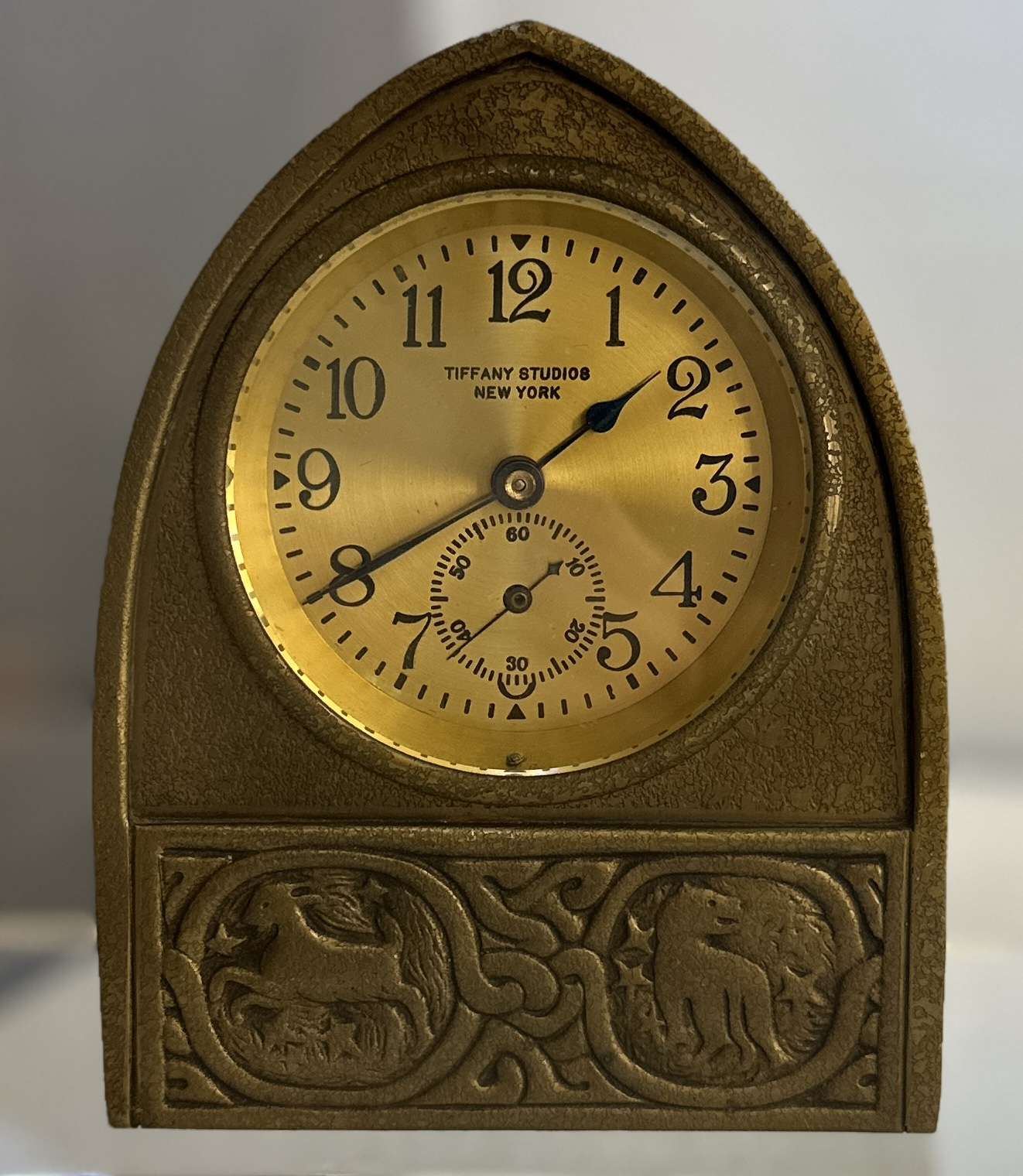
Zodiac Clock (1904), Tiffany Studios

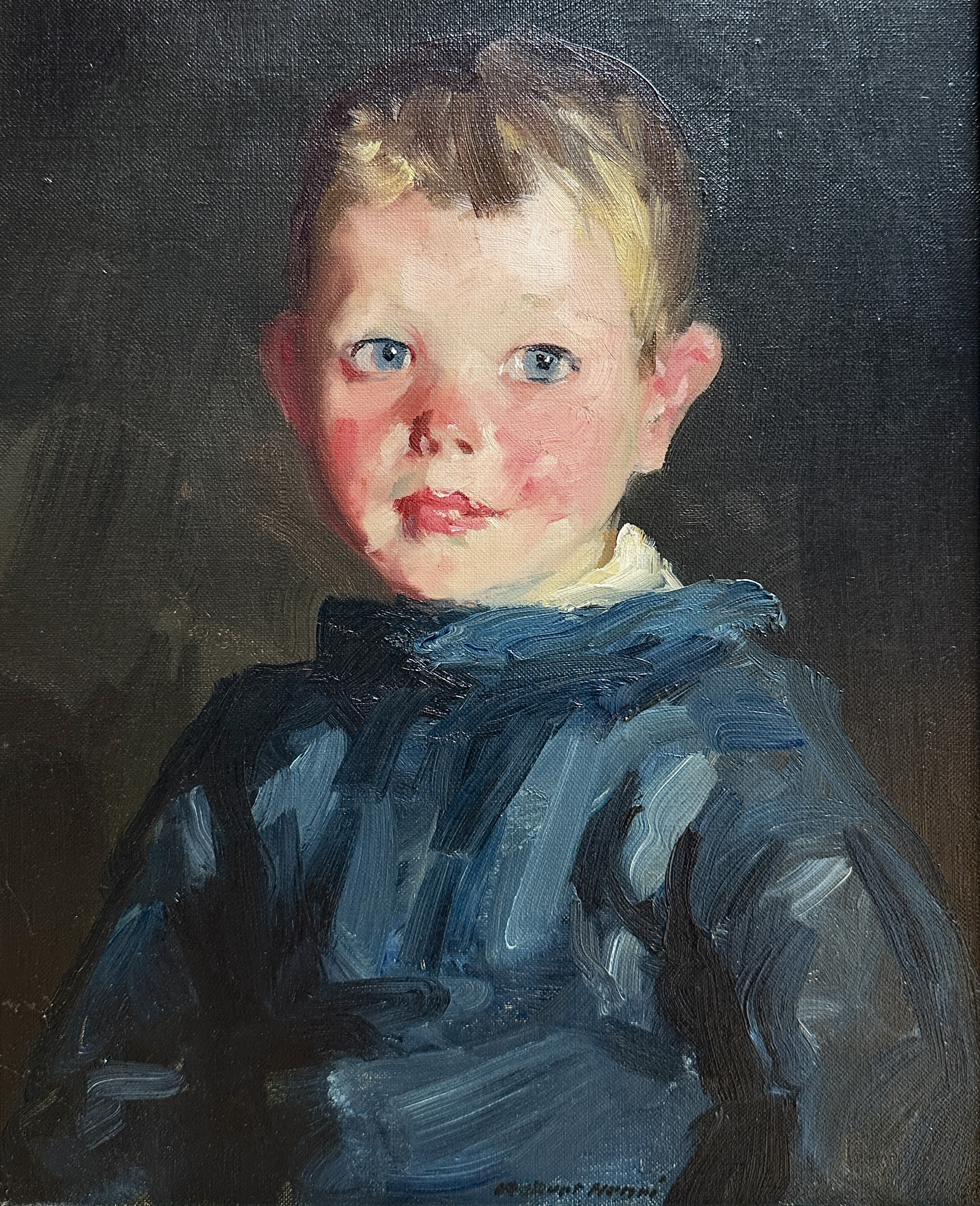
Michael (1913), Robert Henri

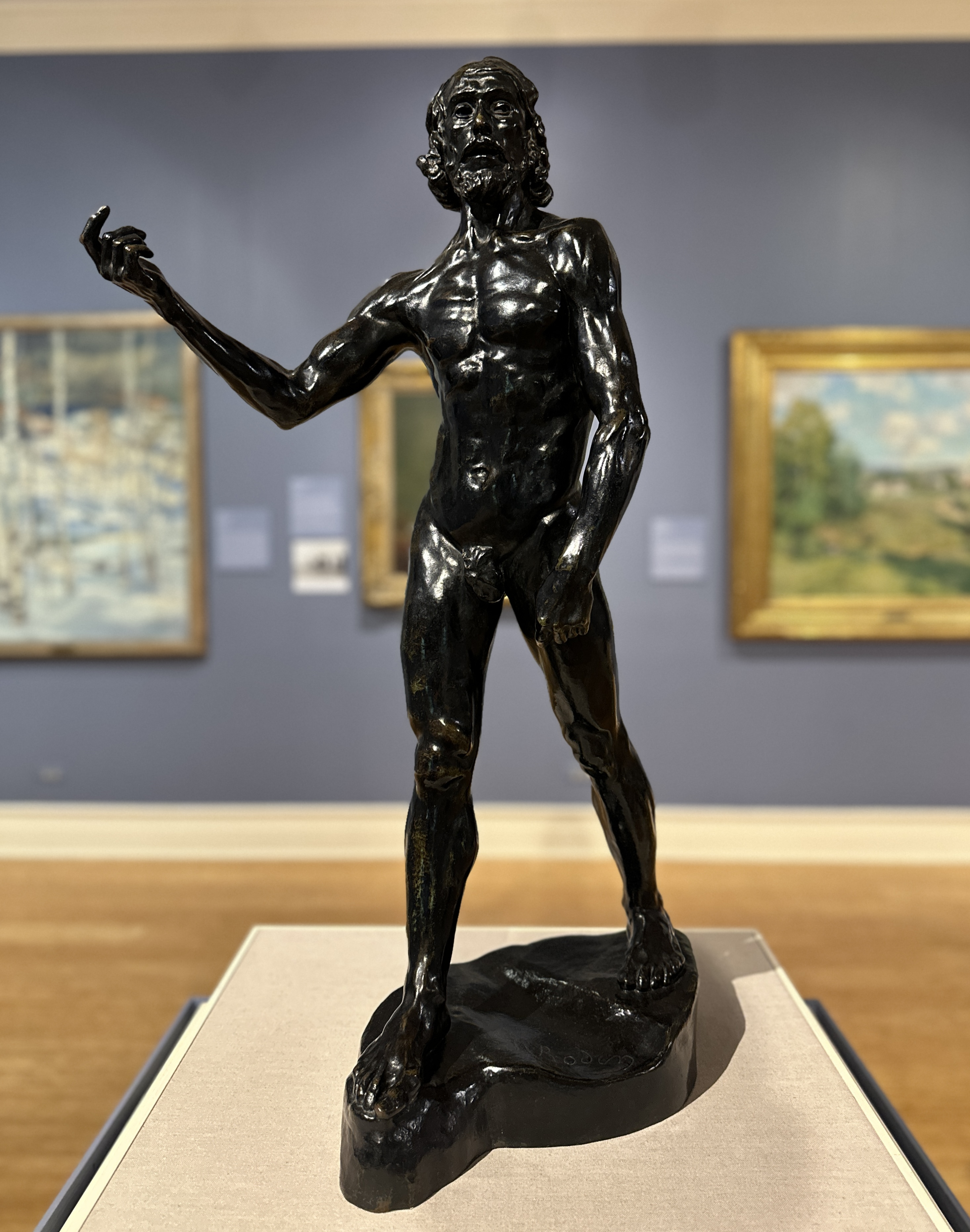
Saint John the Baptist (1878), Auguste Rodin

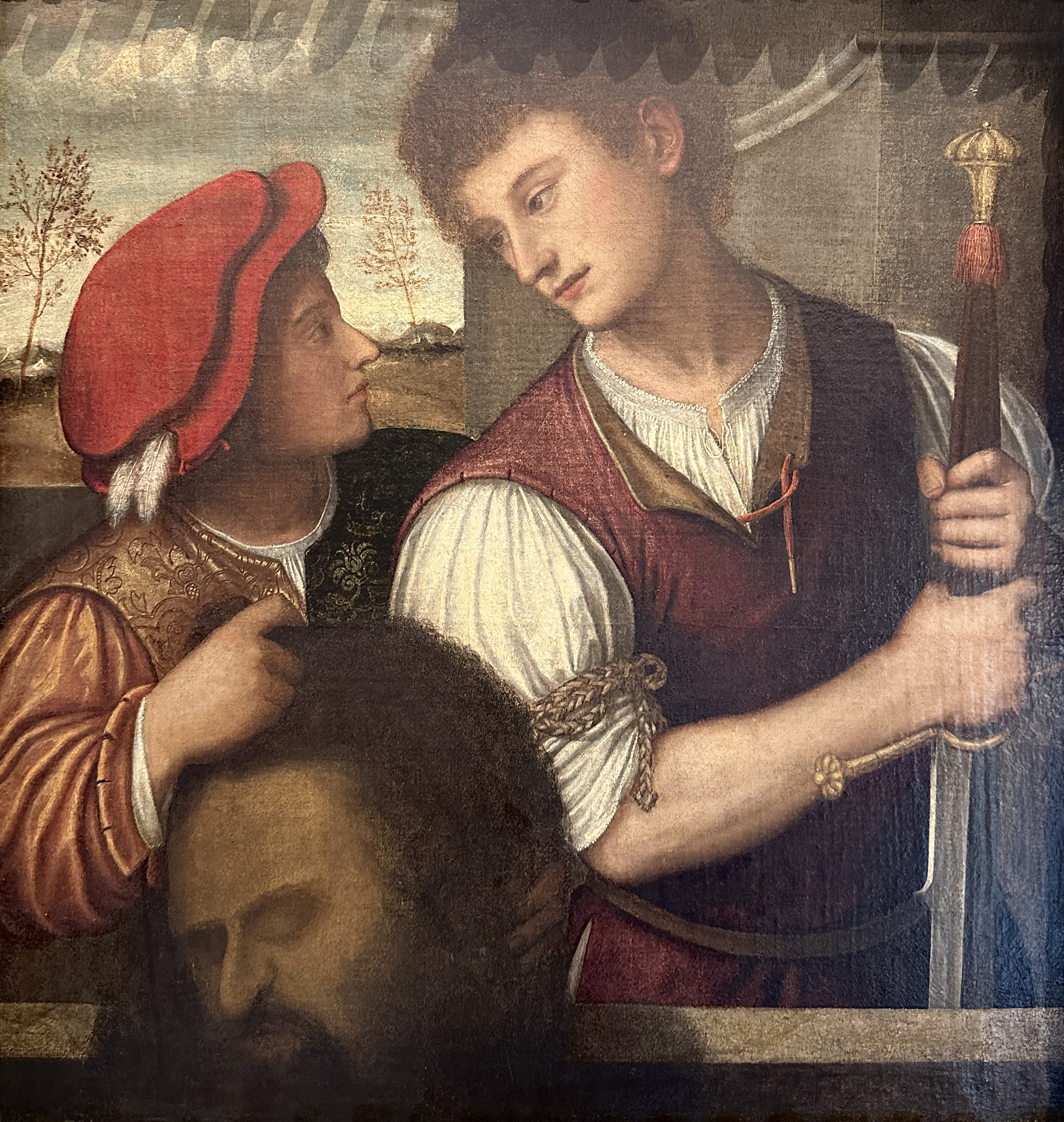
David with the Head of Goliath (1530s), Francesco Beccaruzzi

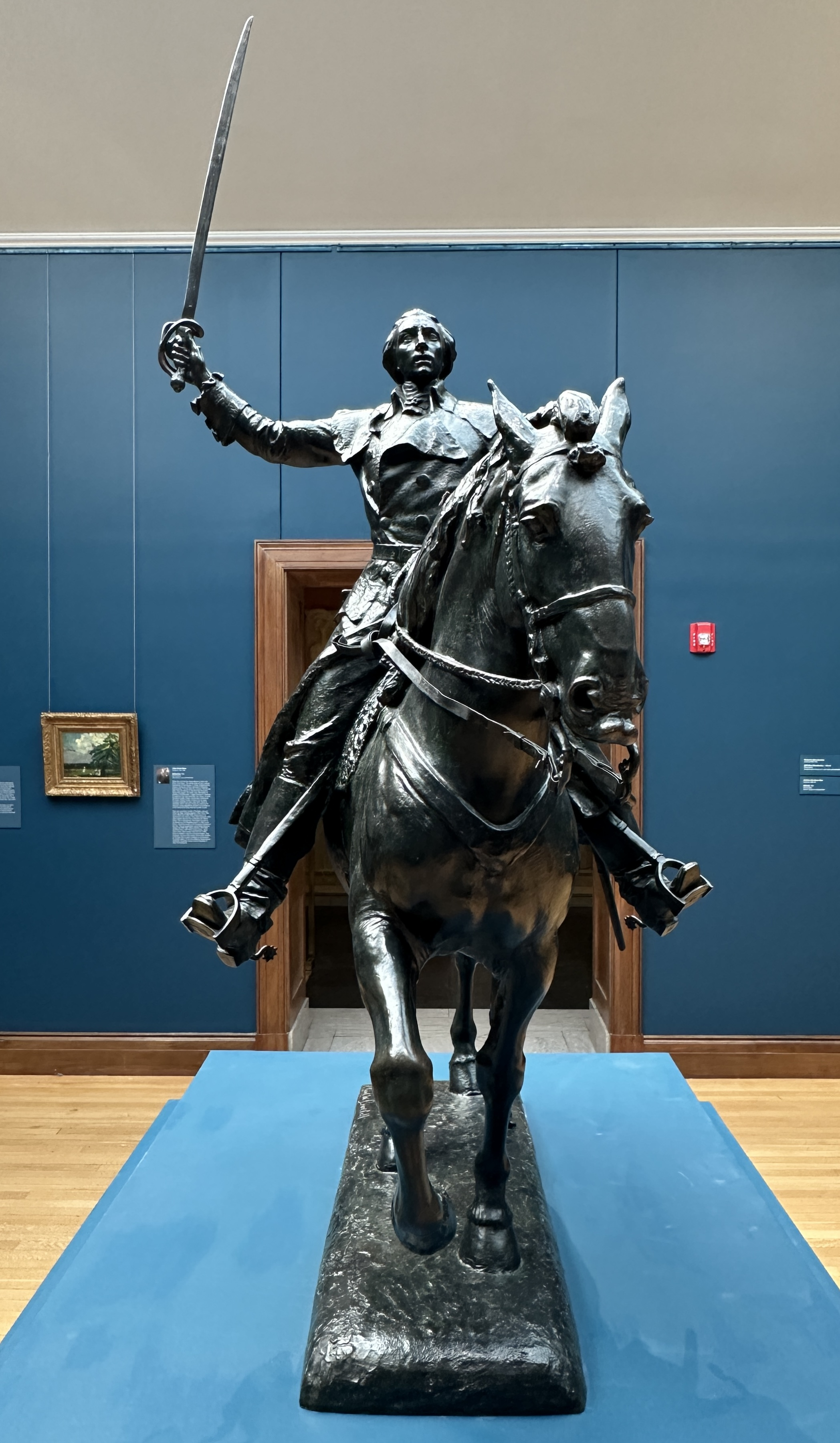
Equestrian statue of Marquis de LaFayette (1900-08), Paul Wayland Bartlett

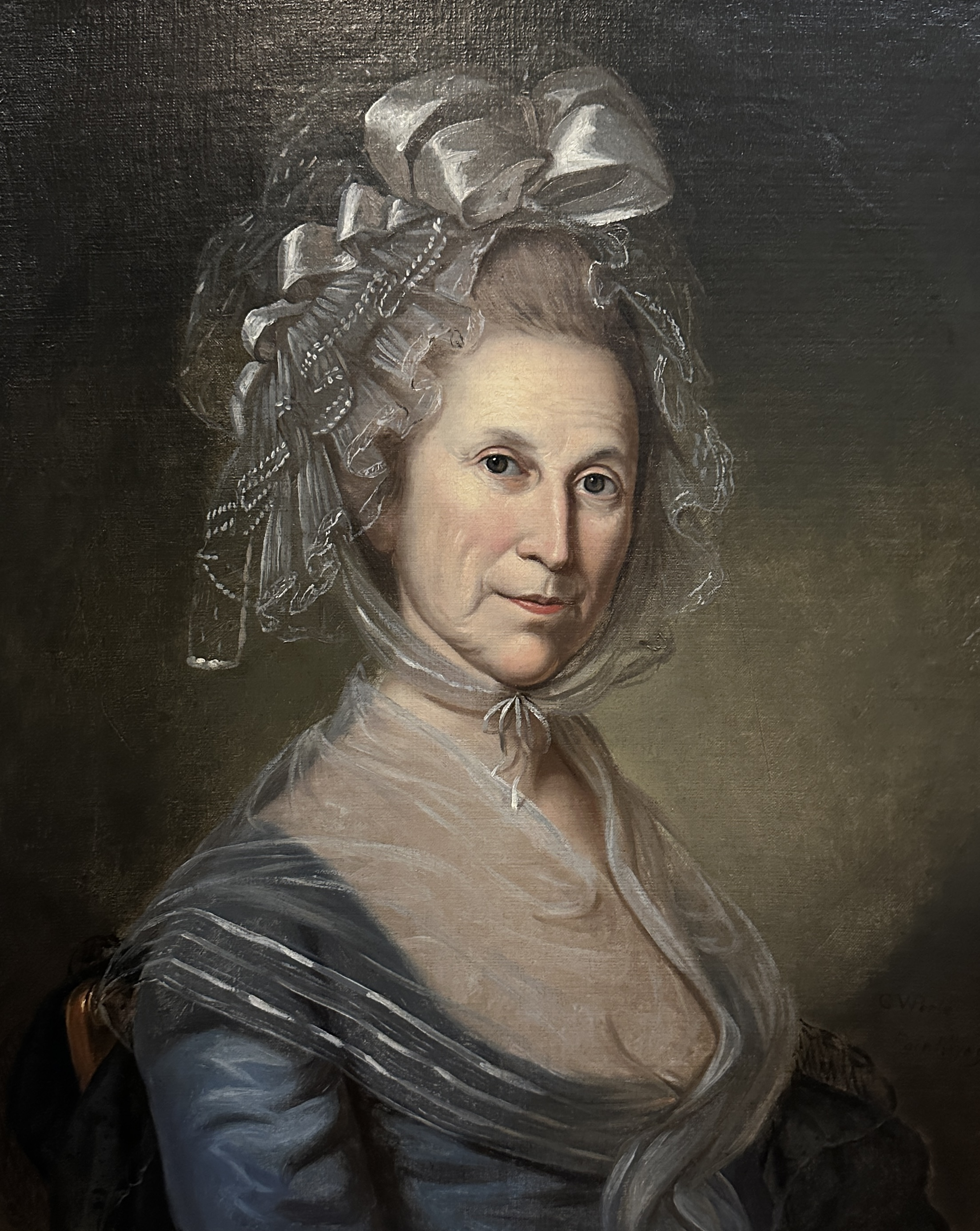
Portrait of Elizabeth Tasker Lowndes (1789), Charles Willson Peale

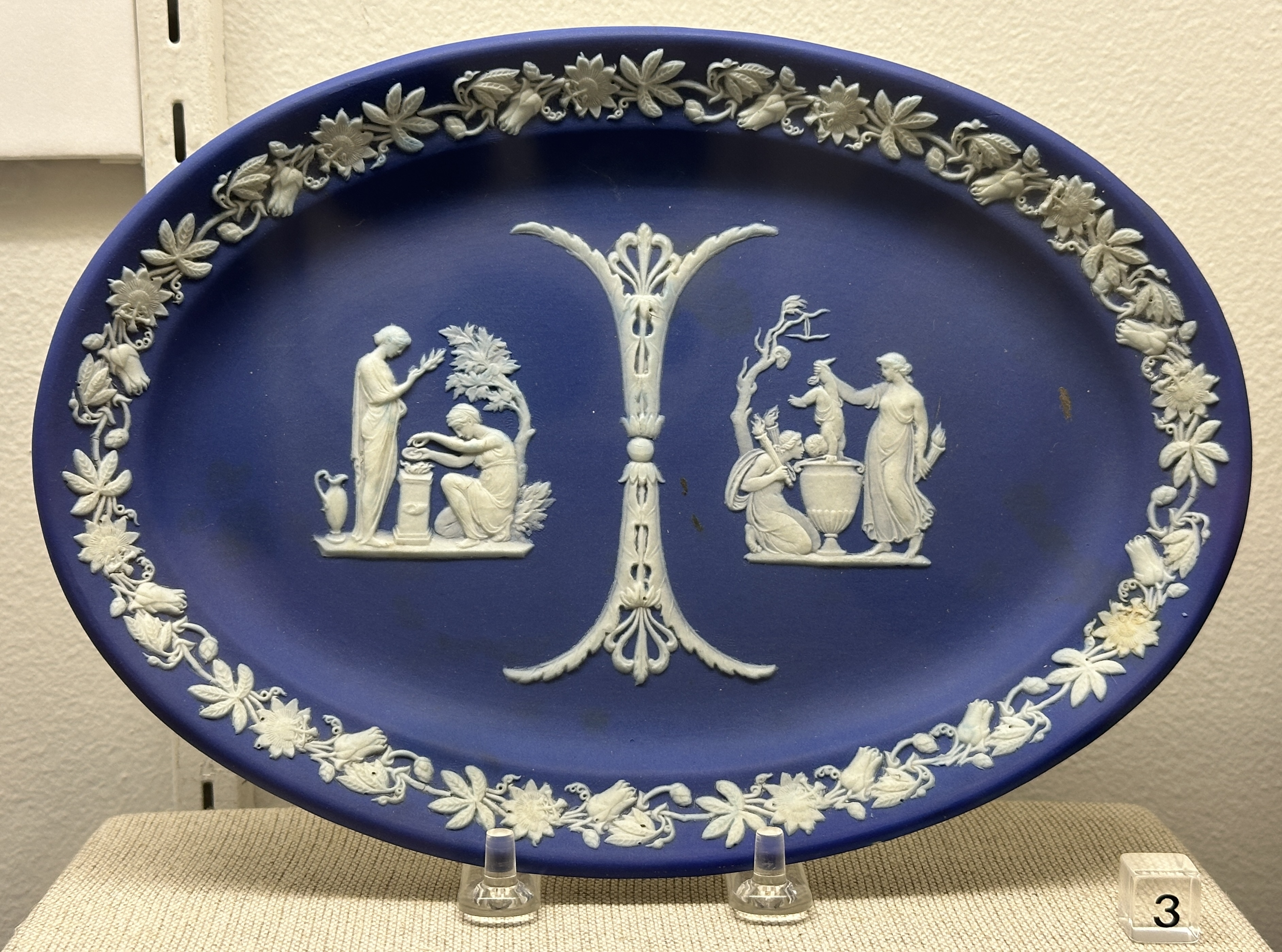
Jasperware Blue Dip Platter (1920), Wedgwood

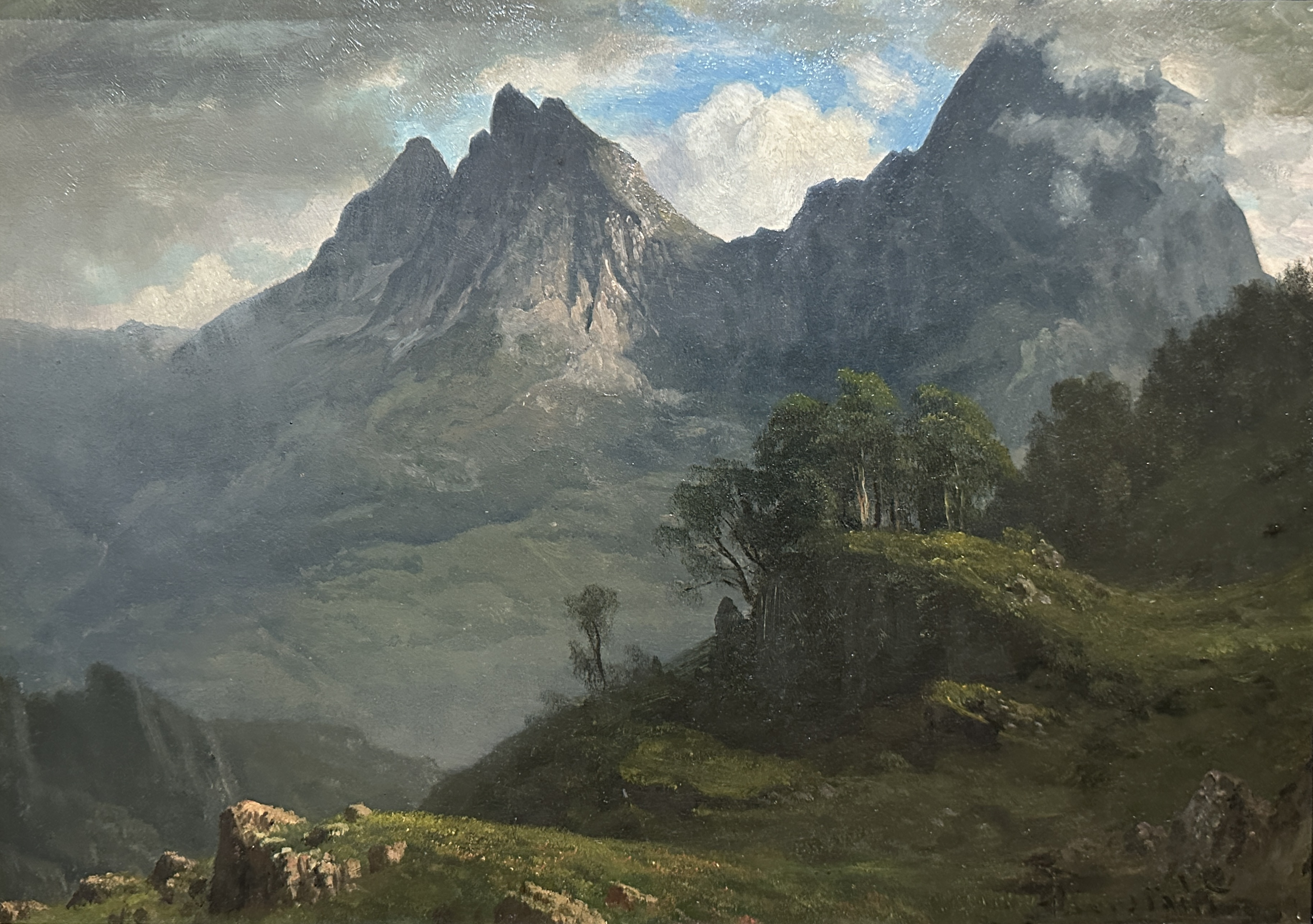
In the Rockies (1880s), Albert Bierstadt

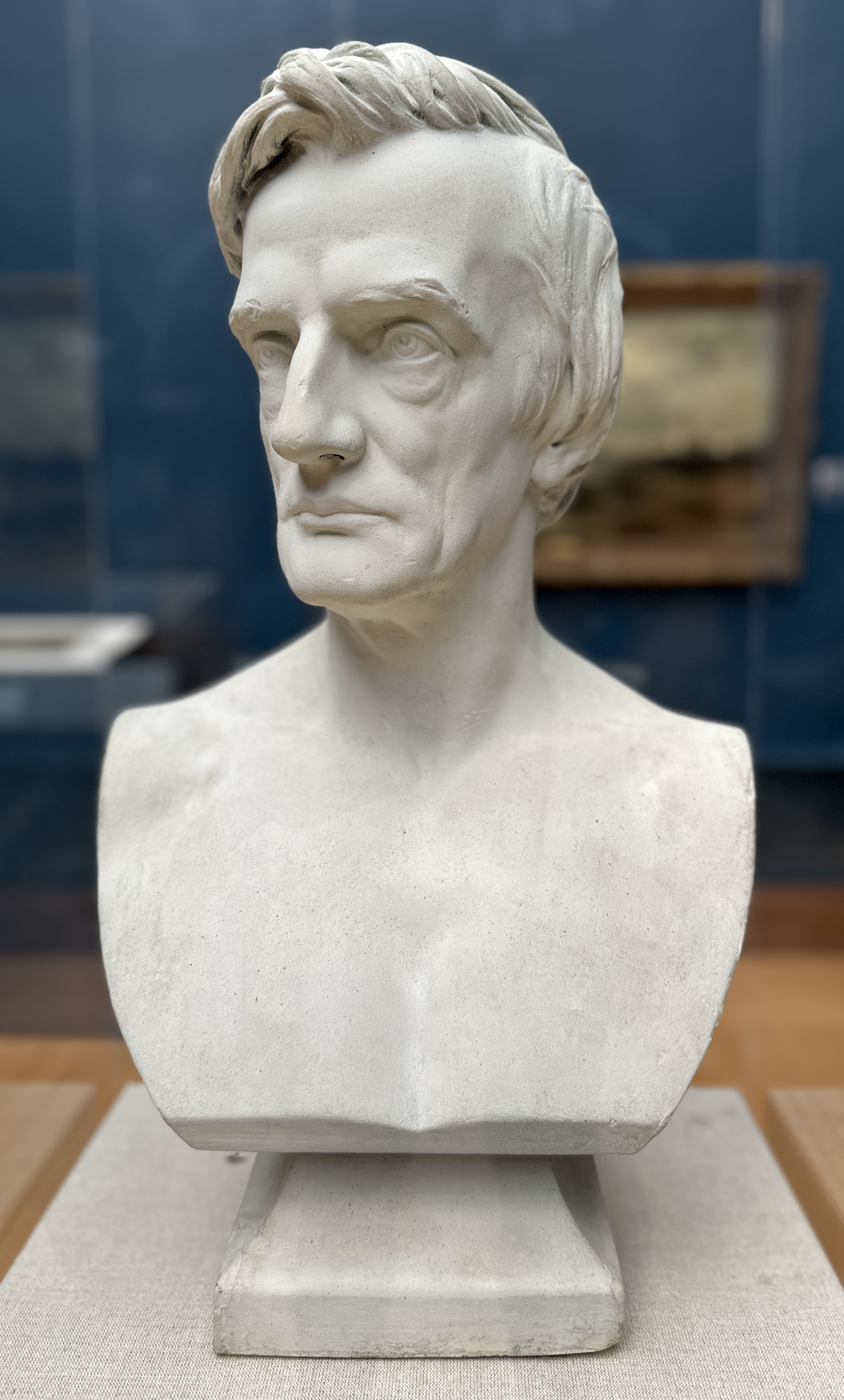
Bust of William Evarts (1874), Augustus Saint-Gaudens

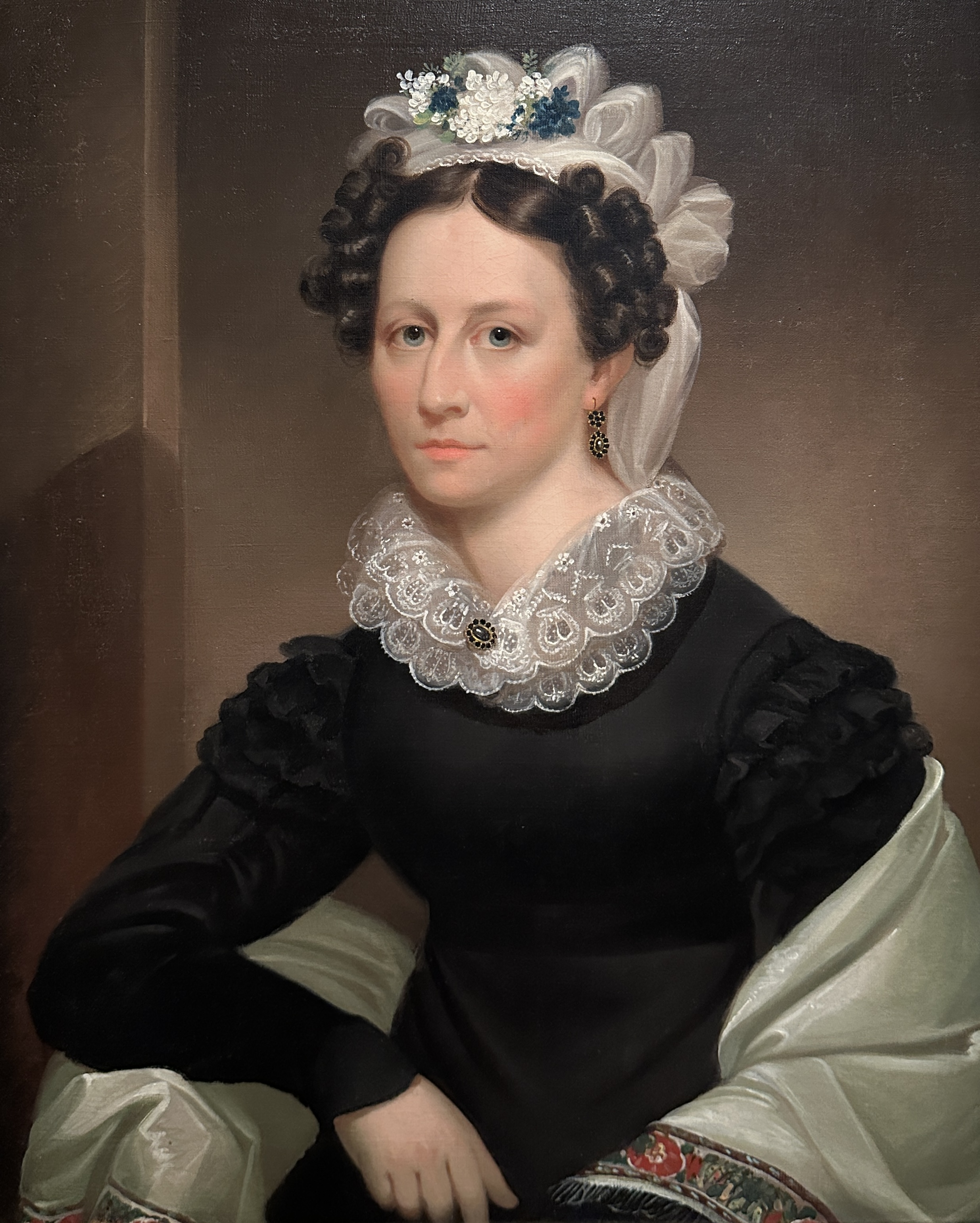
Portrait of a Woman (1820-24), Sarah Miriam Peale

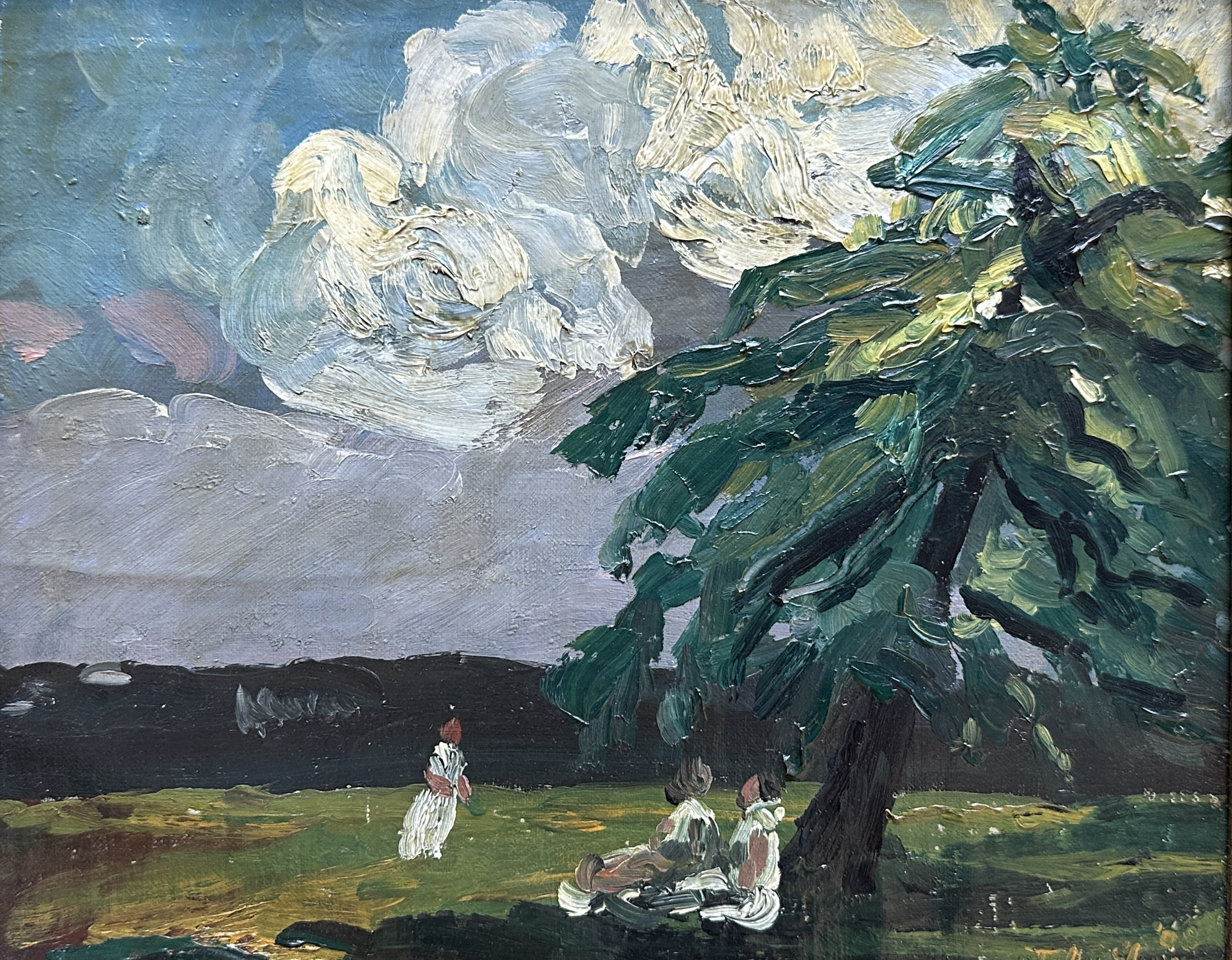
Windy Day (1908), John Sloan
