= Hagerstown City Park =

Historic district in Maryland, United States

- Hagerstown City Park Historic District
- U.S. National Register of Historic Places
- U.S. Historic district
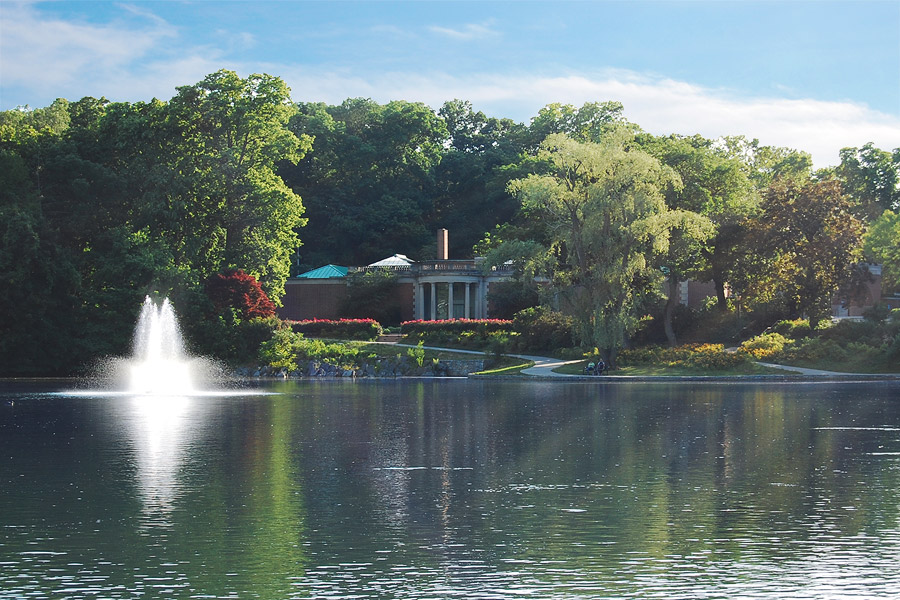
- Washington County Museum of Fine Arts and Lower Lake

- Location within Maryland Location within the United States
- Location: Roughly bounded by W. Howard St., Guilford Ave., Memorial, S. Walnut St., and the Norfolk & Western RR tracks, Hagerstown, Maryland
- Coordinates: 39°38′10″N 77°43′50″W
- Area: 525 acres (212 ha)
- Architect: George Burnap
- Architectural style: Late 19th And Early 20th Century American Movements, Late 19th And 20th Century Revivals, Late Victorian
- NRHP reference No.: 90001017
- Added to NRHP: July 5, 1990

Hagerstown City Park is a public urban park just southwest of the central business district of Hagerstown, Maryland, United States. The park is located at the junction of Virginia Avenue, Key Street, Walnut Street, Prospect Street, and Memorial Boulevard.

== History ==
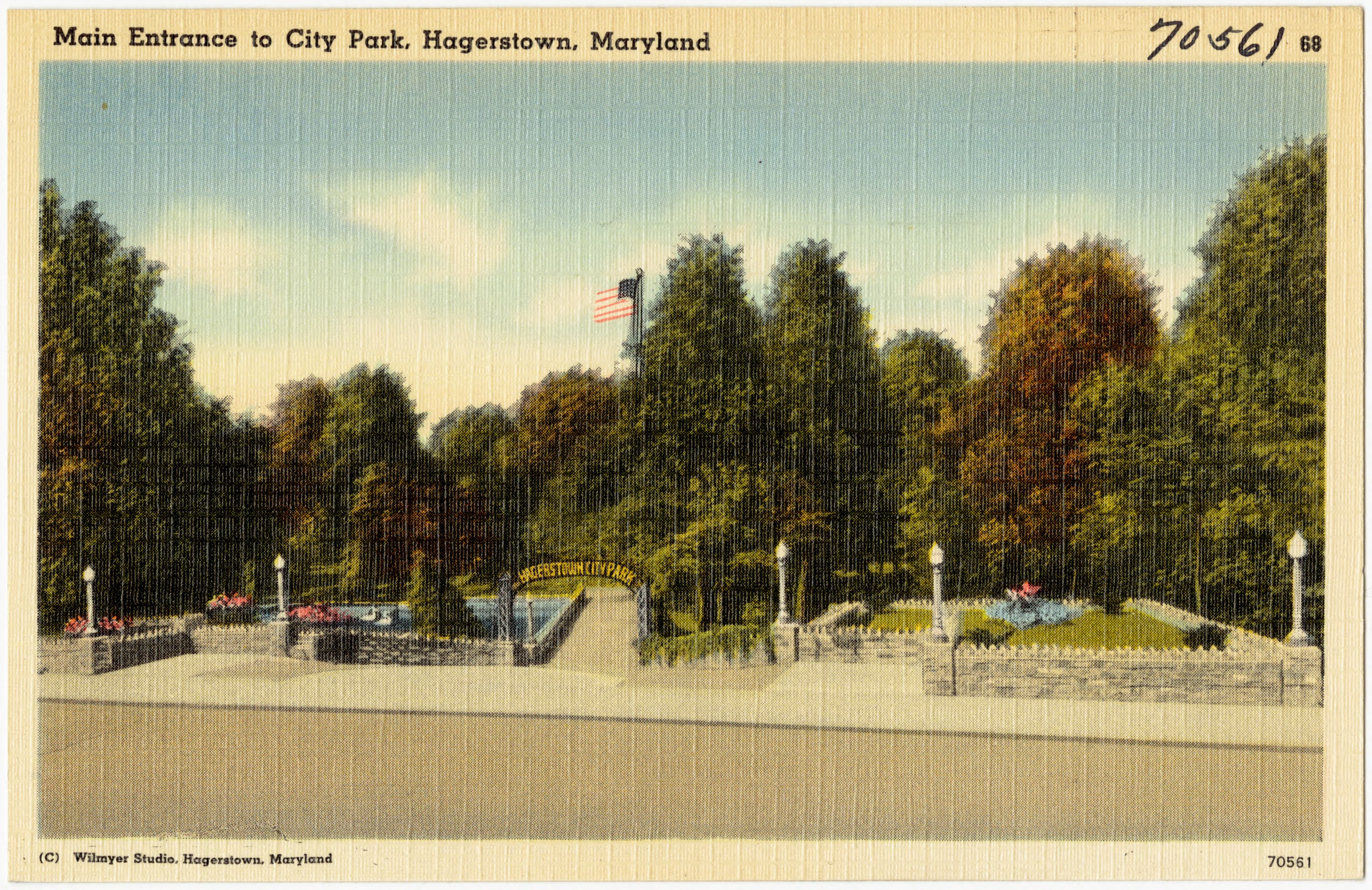
Postcard of City Park between 1930 and 1945

In 1916, under pressure from the public, the City of Hagerstown purchased land to be used for the City Park. The Maryland State General Assembly passed a bill creating a five-member Park Commission in 1918. Three years later, a swamp in the park was drained creating Lower Lake. And in 1924, Mr. and Mrs. Singer donated the Washington County Museum of Fine Arts to City Park. The park project was designed by landscape architect George Burnap.

City Park has been called "America's Second Most Beautiful City Park" and has been designated as a local Preservation Design District since 1989. It was listed on the National Register of Historic Places in 1990. The district also includes the surrounding industrial area and residential neighborhoods. It consists largely of a late 19th and early 20th century residential area with most houses dating from 1890-1930.

== Attractions ==
There are numerous walking paths and playgrounds in the park as well as athletic facilities such as lighted tennis courts and a baseball field. An outdoor concert stage which holds city events is located in the center of City Park. Also within the park is Park Plaza, a luxury condominium complex. Also available in the park are walking trails, paddle boats, and even fitness events.

Additionally, many of Hagerstown's most visited museums can be found within City Park:

- Washington County Museum of Fine Arts
- Mansion House Art Gallery
- Western Maryland 202 Locomotive and the Train Hub
- Hager House and Museum, once home to Jonathan Hager, founder of Hagerstown.

== Gallery ==
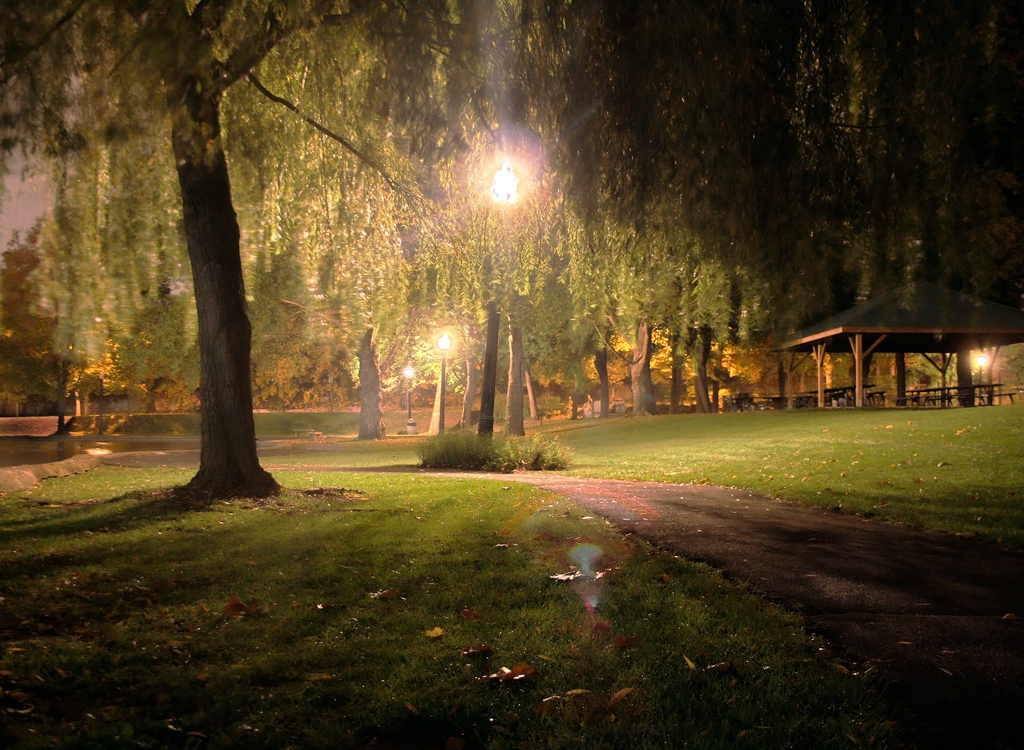
Walking path through willows in Hagerstown City Park.

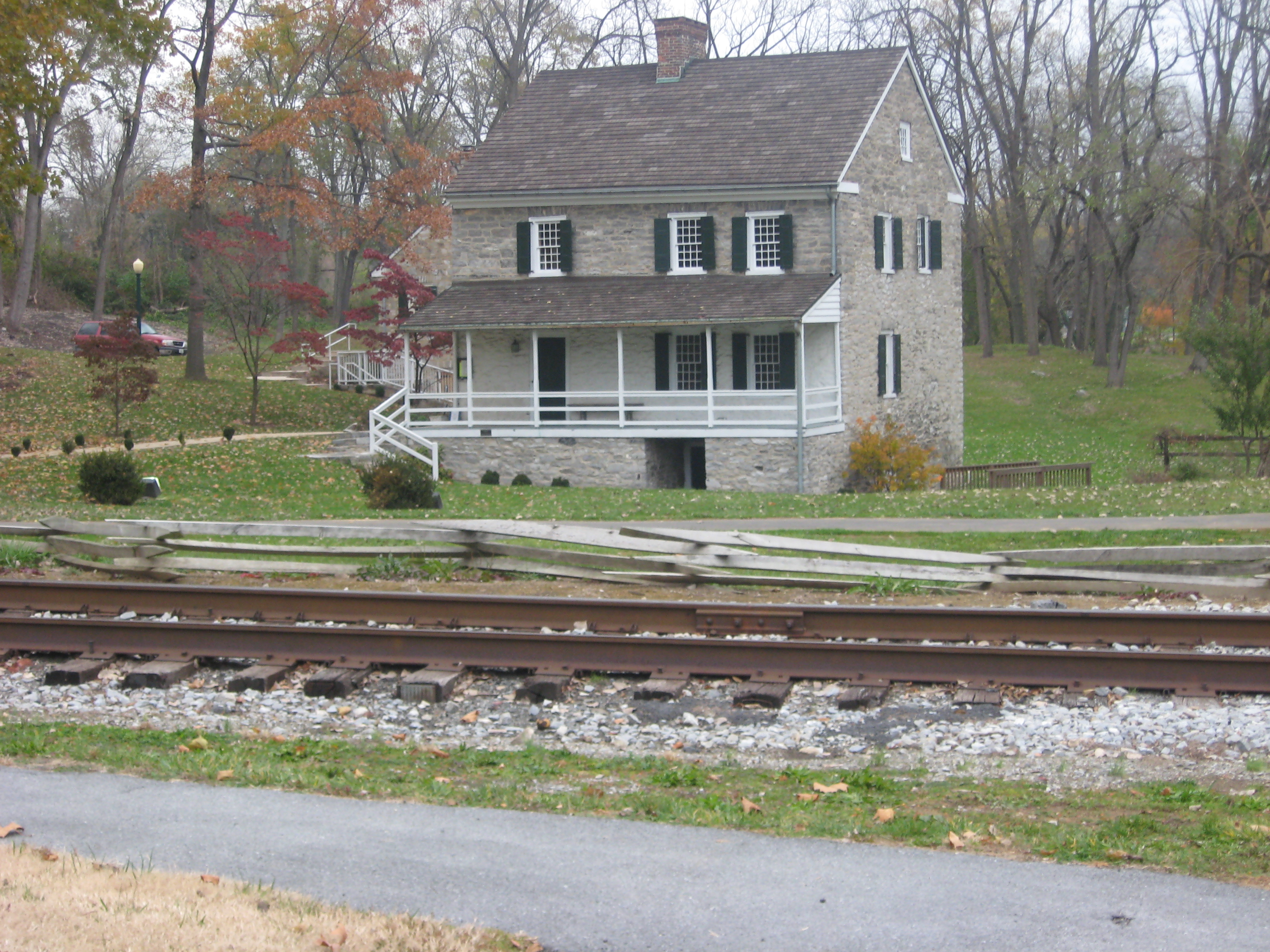
Hager House and Museum

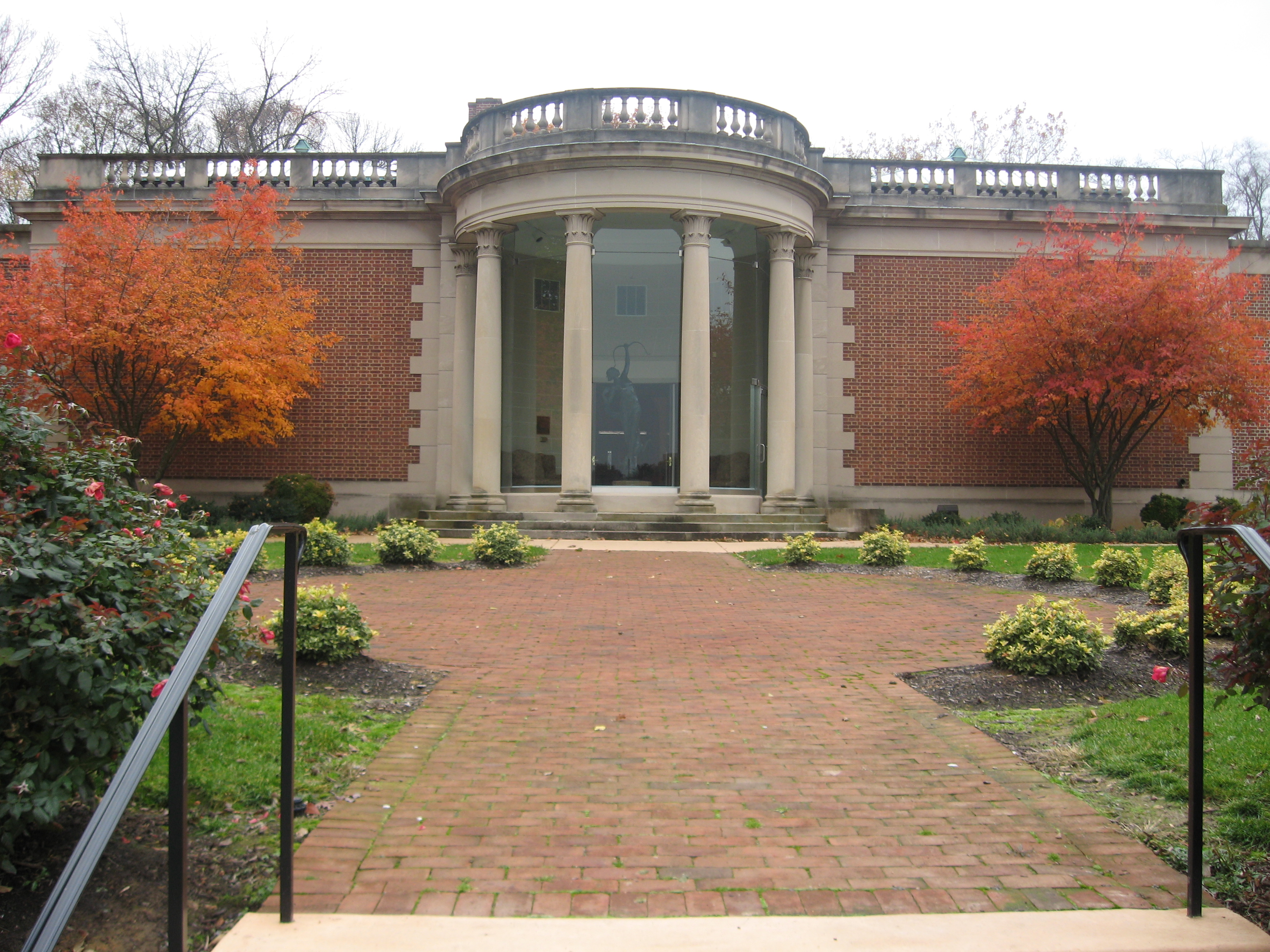
Washington County Museum of Fine Arts

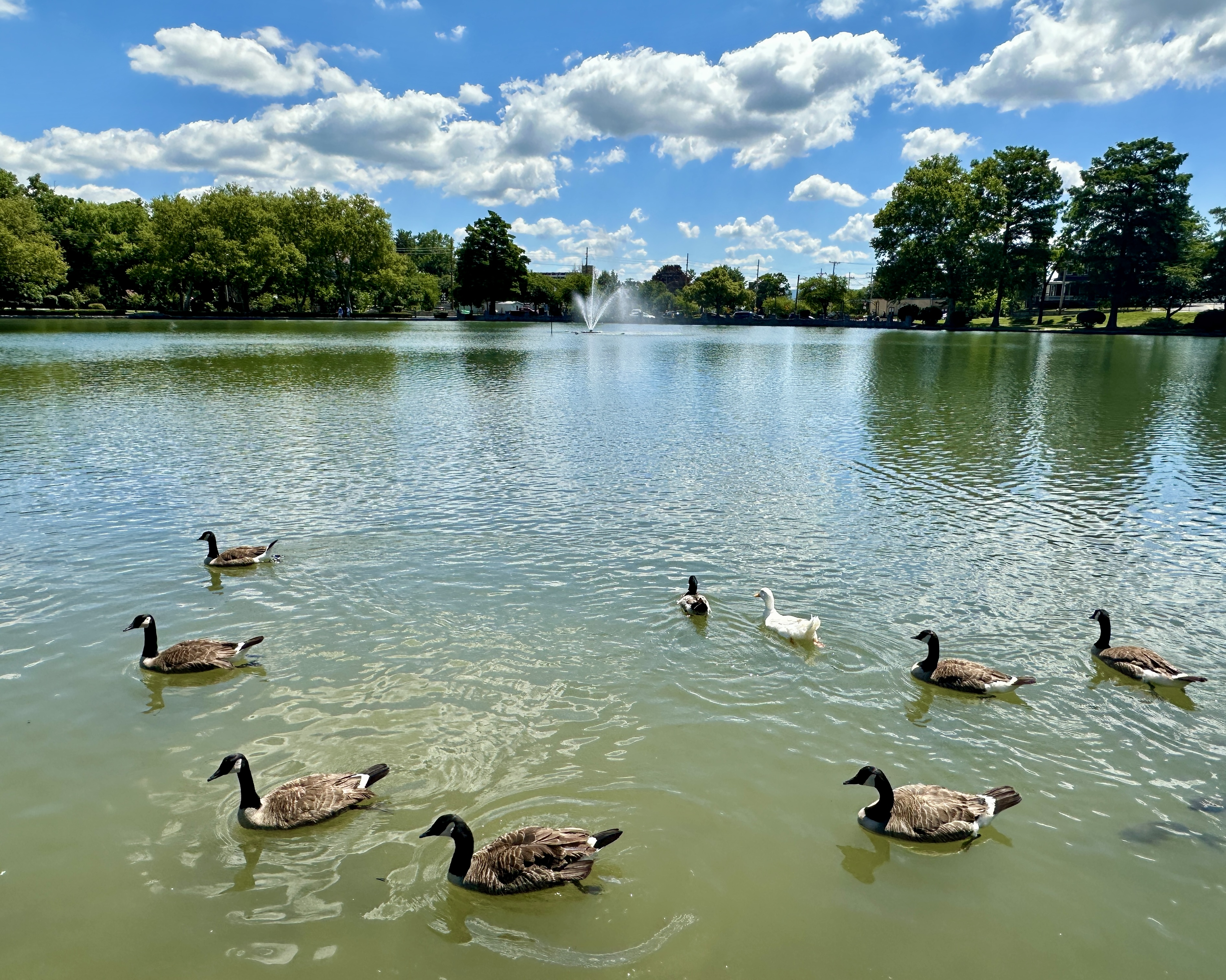
The Lower Lake

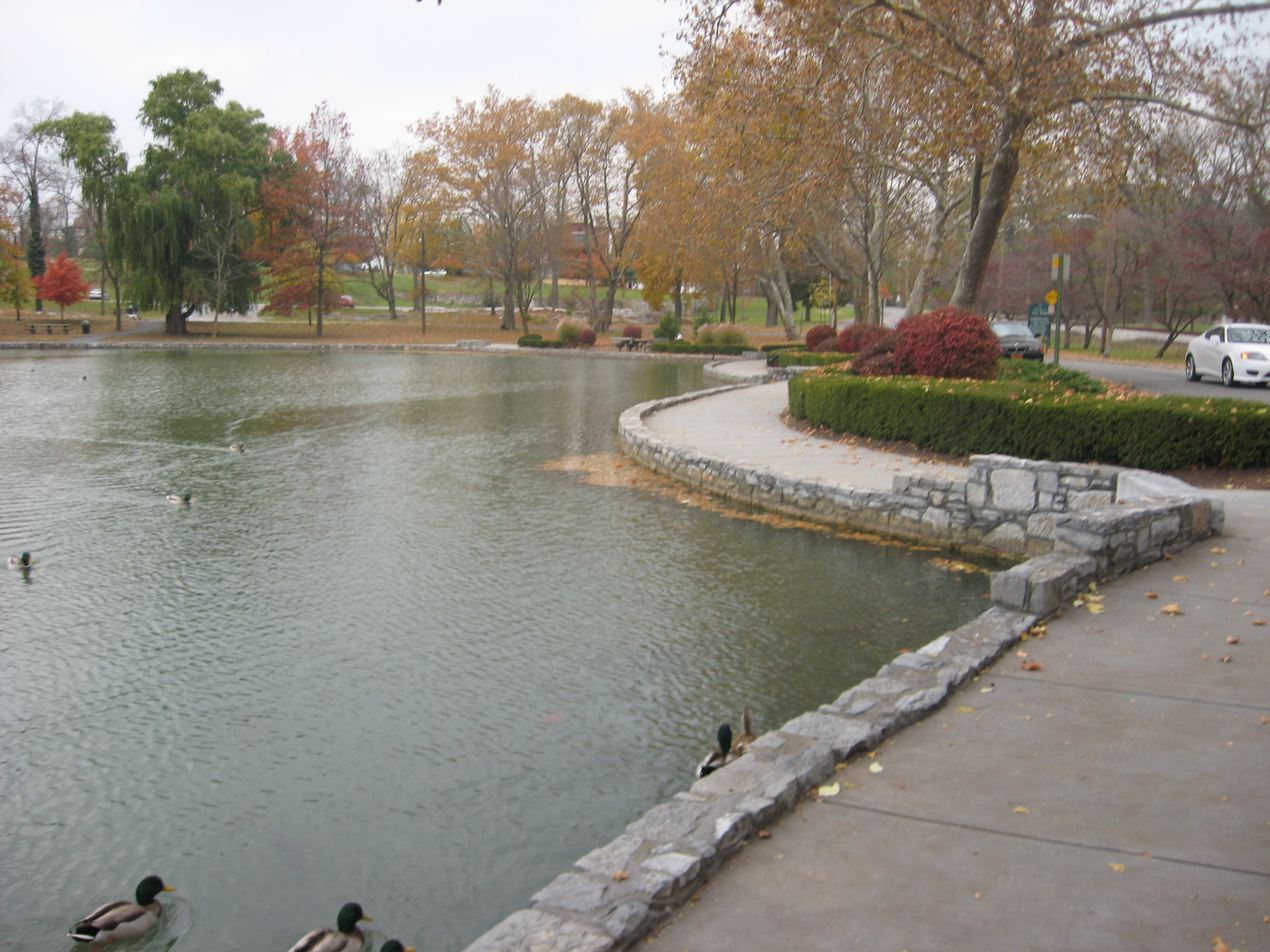
Walkway encircling Lower Lake

Train Hub Museum

Western Maryland 202
