= Tapeworm Railroad =

Proposed railroad in Maryland and Pennsylvania

External image
- modern map of the Tapeworm route

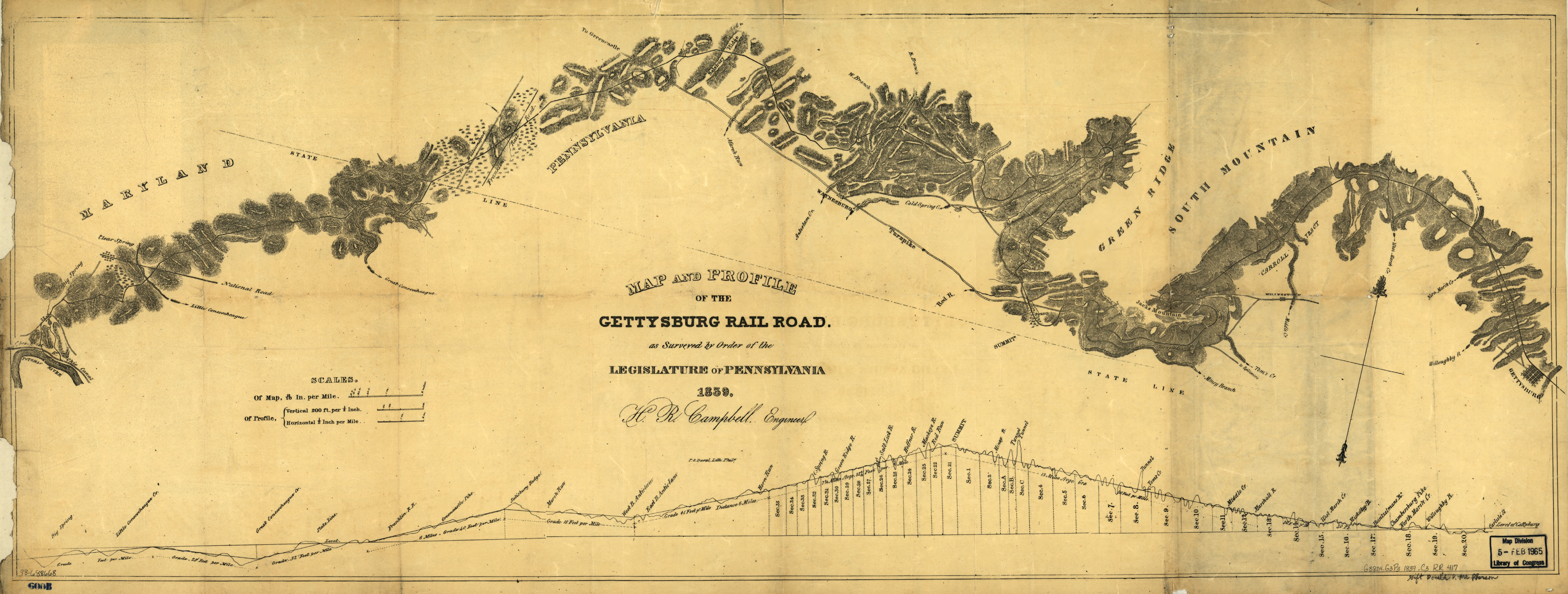
1839 map of planned route (Big Spring, Maryland to Gettysburg, Pennsylvania) by Henry Campbell, civil engineer

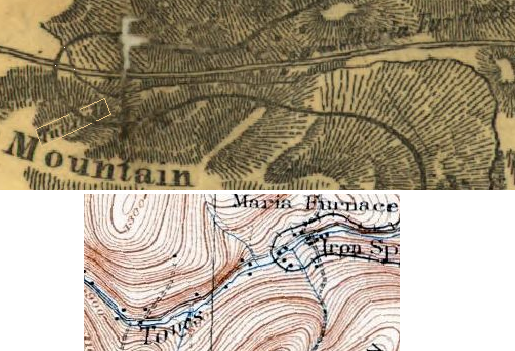
The surveyed route from Maria Furnace westward along the Nichol's Gap Road (top image) was to loop west of the location where the highway crossed Toms Creek in a topographic gap (Fairfield Gap) between ~900 ft (270 m) levels (bottom). The 1839 commonwealth survey map shows that the three crossing points between the route, the highway, and the creek (white pixels at top, with misaligned hachures to the northeast) were at three different points: 39.768849°N 77.424281°W, 39.769261°N 77.424088°W, 39.769426°N 77.423766°W At the easternmost of the three points, the railroad company built a single-arch stone bridge for the highway over the creek. (The highway bridge is often misidentified as being for the railway and, with the misnomer "viaduct" inaccurately indicating multiple arches.) In addition to the never-built Tapeworm Railroad trestle to cross the gap west of the roadway bridge, a Tapeworm Railroad tunnel was planned nearby (top, outlined) through a spur of Jacks Mountain. In 1888–1889, the "Western Extension" was built by the Baltimore and Harrisburg Railway (bottom) east of the gap, crossing Toms Creek at a lower elevation than the original Tapeworm Railroad route.

The Tapeworm Railroad (Gettysburg Rail Road) was a railway line planned by Congressman Thaddeus Stevens and nicknamed by opponents ridiculing a lengthy serpentine section around the Green Ridge of South Mountain after an orator compared the path to a tapeworm depiction on a product's packaging. Switchbacks were planned on the west slope at Hughs Forge along the E Br Antietam Creek ("Cold Spring Cr" in 1839) and on the east slope at Stevens' 1822 Maria Furnace along Toms Creek (Monocacy River), with three east slope tunnels through spurs of Jacks Mountain.

In 1836, Herman Haupt had surveyed the "road from Gettysburg across South Mountain to the Potomac" and in 1838, the rail "bed" was "graded for a number of miles, never got further than Monterey", and included the following (west-to-east):

- single-arch roadway bridge over Toms Creek west of Iron Springs, Pennsylvania
- multi-arch bridge
- viaduct at Virginia Mills
- deep cut near Marsh Creek
- elevated railbed on banks of Willoughby Run
- McPherson Ridge railway cut, site of the 1863 Battle of Gettysburg military engagements on McPherson Ridge
- Seminary Ridge railway cut

After Thaddeus Stevens lost his position on the Canal Commission, the commonwealth ended the railroad's financing and work was suspended in 1838, and an 1839 survey was ordered of the planned line.

The Tapeworm Railroad right-of-way was later used by the Susquehanna, Gettysburg and Potomac Railway and its successor, the Baltimore and Harrisburg Railway to build a line from Gettysburg west to Highfield, Maryland.
