= Nichol's Gap Road =

The Nichol's Gap Road was a central Pennsylvania highway established in the 18th century near Maryland, extending westward from the Black's Gap Road "just west of Little Conewago Creek" at the Crofs Keys stand of James Black. The road went past both the Rock Creek Church and the 1761 Samuel Gettys tavern where Gettysburg would be surveyed in 1786. The highway was built over South Mountain (Maryland and Pennsylvania) via Nichol's Gap (39.75204°N 77.470994°W) and down the Devils Racecourse into the Cumberland Valley, allowing access to Hagerstown, Maryland. Called the "Hagerstown Road" during the Battle of Gettysburg, parts of the road are now designated (east-to-west): U.S. Route 30, Pennsylvania Route 116 (Fairfield Road to Fairfield, Pennsylvania), Iron Springs Road, Gum Springs Road, and Old Route 16. (The summit section through Nichol's Gap—"Fairfield Gap" during the Civil War—no longer has a roadway.)

== History ==
The Nichol's Gap Road was established westward by a Commonwealth of Pennsylvania Act of 1781, crossing an Indian trail on which a road had been established by 1749 southward from Paxton, Pennsylvania, to the area of the Carroll tracts near Maryland. The 1786 Fairfield Inn on the Nichol's Gap Road was established on the east side of South Mountain (Millerstown was surveyed in 1801), and the 1792 "Oxford Town" was laid out near the road's east end by Henry Kuhn at the 1763 Kuhn Tavern. The 1805 Harbaugh homestead was built at the base of the road's west slope near the 1760s Mason–Dixon line. The 1809 Gettysburg and Petersburg Turnpike crossed the Nichol's Gap Road at the Gettysburg borough, and the 1812 Black Horse Tavern was established on the road at the Marsh Creek stone arch bridge.

In 1818, the York and Gettysburg Turnpike Company established their turnpike on eastern portions of the Nichol's Gap Road, and the 1820 Waynesboro–Emmitsburg Turnpike crossed the Nichol's Gap Road west of their summits. (A toll gate was at the crossroads.) The 1822 Maria Furnace was established along the road at the foot of the east slope, and Herman Haupt located the 1836 Tapeworm Railroad course to cross the Nichol's Gap Road west of Toms Creek. In addition to excavations for parts of the Tapeworm bed, the Commonwealth built a single-arch stone roadway bridge over Toms Creek for the Nichol's Gap Road. (The 1888-9 Western Extension by the Baltimore and Harrisburg Railway still uses a stone arch bridge over the road at Iron Springs, Pennsylvania.)

The 1863 Fight at Monterey Pass was a Gettysburg campaign engagement at the toll gate near the summit. (One Union body was buried at the site and re-interred by 1913 in the Gettysburg National Cemetery.) In 1913, the original Lincoln Highway was designated on the portion of the route between Gettysburg and Cross Keys, and in 1920 the Commonwealth offered the toll house west of Fairfield for sale. The modern highway between Fairfield and Gettysburg was constructed in 1927 ("Fairfield Road"), replacing single-lane stone bridges at Muddy Run and "at Plank's".

== See also ==
- Susquehanna and Tioga Turnpike
