= Virginia Mills, Pennsylvania =

- Unincorporated community
- Interactive map of Virginia Mills, Pennsylvania
- Country: United States
- State: Pennsylvania
- County: Adams
- Township: Hamiltonban
- Established: prior to 1889
- GNIS ID & Coordinates: 1190443; 39°48′10″N 77°22′34″W

Virginia Mills, Pennsylvania was an 1889 stop on the Western Extension of the Baltimore and Harrisburg Railway near Fairfield, Pennsylvania and the site of the 1863 Battle of Fairfield in the American Civil War. The railway was routed near the mill site on the John Linn farm and an 1838 Tapeworm Railroad viaduct on the Rev. A. W. Geigley farm.
