= Fairfield Area High School =

Coordinates: 39.78187°N 77.37507°W

- 4840 Fairfield Road; Fairfield, Pennsylvania; 17320; United States

Information
- Type: Public
- Principal: Brian W. McDowell
- Staff: 26.24 (FTE)
- Grades: 9th through 12th
- Enrollment: 289 (2023-2024)
- Student to teacher ratio: 11.01
- Campus type: Rural
- Colors: Green and gold
- Mascot: Green Knight
- Website: Fairfield Area High School

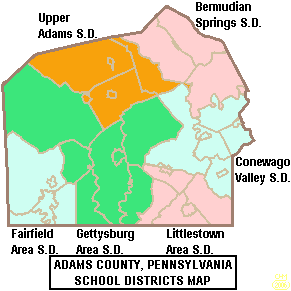
Map of Adams County, Pennsylvania school districts

Fairfield Area High School is a small, rural, public high school located in the borough of Fairfield, Pennsylvania, United States. The school serves students from most of southwestern Adams County. In 2016, enrollment was reported as 366 pupils in 9th through 12th grades. The school employed 29 full-time teachers.

The school's mascot is the Green Knight. The school is part of the Fairfield Area School District.

== Sports ==
Boys:

- Baseball – AA
- Basketball – AA
- Cross country – A
- Football – A
- Golf – AA
- Soccer – A
- Track and field – AA
- Wrestling - AA

Girls:

- Basketball – AA
- Cross country – A
- Field hockey – AA
- Soccer (fall) – A
- Softball – AA
- Track and field – AA
- Volleyball – AA
