= Monterey, Pennsylvania =

Unincorporated community in Pennsylvania, US

- populated place
- Location within Pennsylvania
- Coordinates: 39°44′17″N 77°28′17″W
- Country: United States
- State: Pennsylvania
- County: Franklin
- Township: Washington
- Established by: 1875

Area
  - Total: 250 sq mi (650 km^{2})
- Elevation: 1,335 ft (407 m)
- ZIP code: 17214
- Area code: 717
- Census code: 50600
- GNIS ID: 1181451
- NRHP #: 76001639

Monterey, Pennsylvania, is an unincorporated community which was added to the USGS Geographic Names Information System on August 2, 1979. After the site was surveyed c. 1839 for the never-completed Tapeworm Railroad, the summit community was settled on the Emmitsburg & Waynesboro Turnpike east of the Nichol's Gap Road intersection near the Toll Gate and Brown's Spring and later bypassed by the 20th century Pennsylvania Route 16 highway.

As with the Pen Mar Park to the south, Monterey was the site of numerous resort facilities such as the Clermont House, 1887 Monterey Hotel, the Monterey House, the Monterey Inn, the Monterey Academy, and the Monterey Country Club. The community's post office established in the late 19th century was named Charmian (another PA post office already was named Monterey), and the Charmian station of the Baltimore and Harrisburg Railway was established after the Western Extension was laid in 1888–1889 (cf. Monterey Station in 1872).

== Civil War ==
As a mountain community near the intersection of the turnpike and the Nichol's Gap Road, the Monterey area was an 1863 American Civil War site through which both Federal and Confederate forces maneuvered during the Gettysburg campaign (e.g., Buford's Cavalry en route to a June 29/30 Fountaindale bivouac) and a military engagement during the retreat from Gettysburg was at the Monterey location. On July 5, prisoners of war encamped at and east of the site, and "two soldiers of the Fourth Carolina Cavalry" were buried "near the gatehouse of the Monterey Springs".

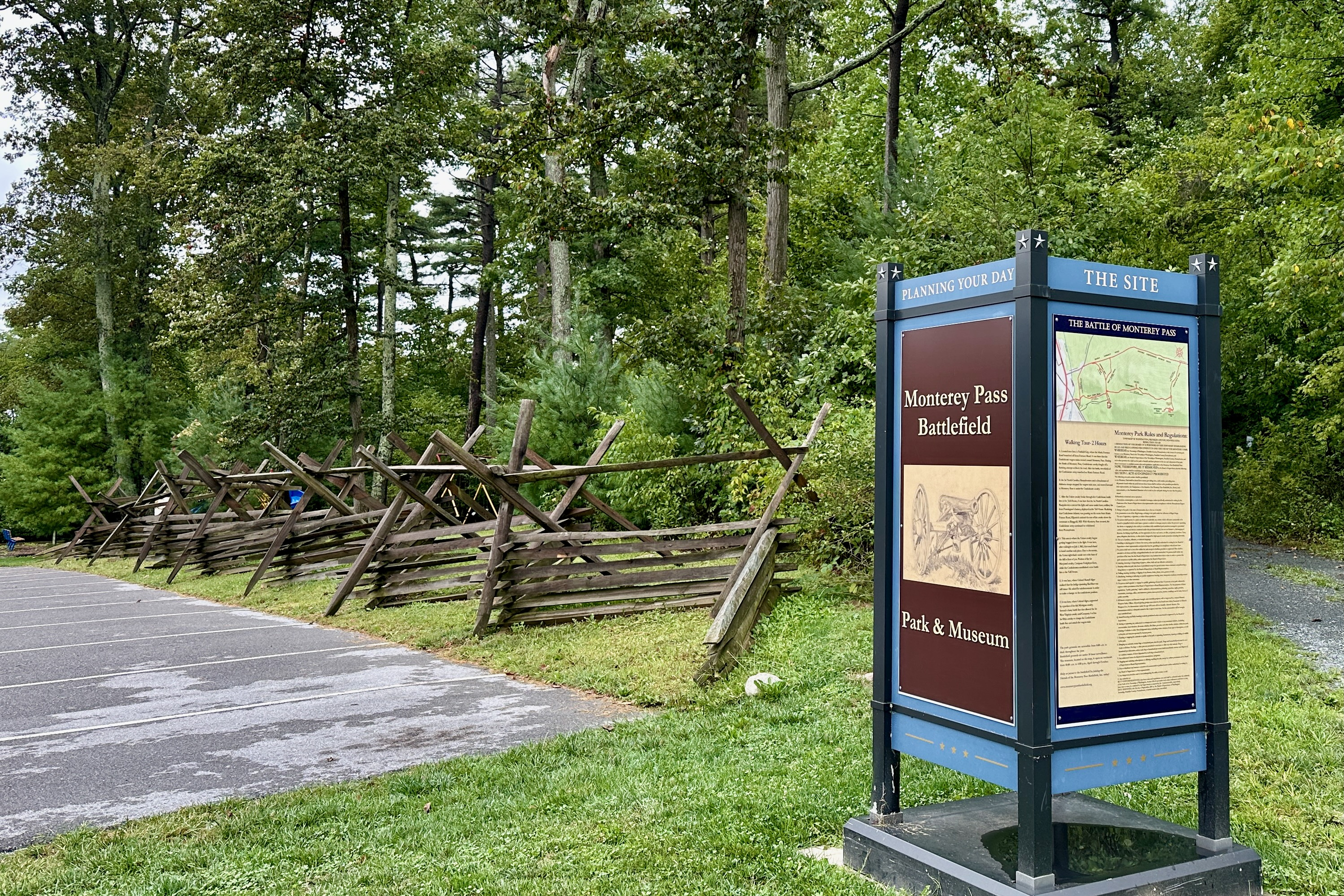
Monterey Pass Battlefield Park

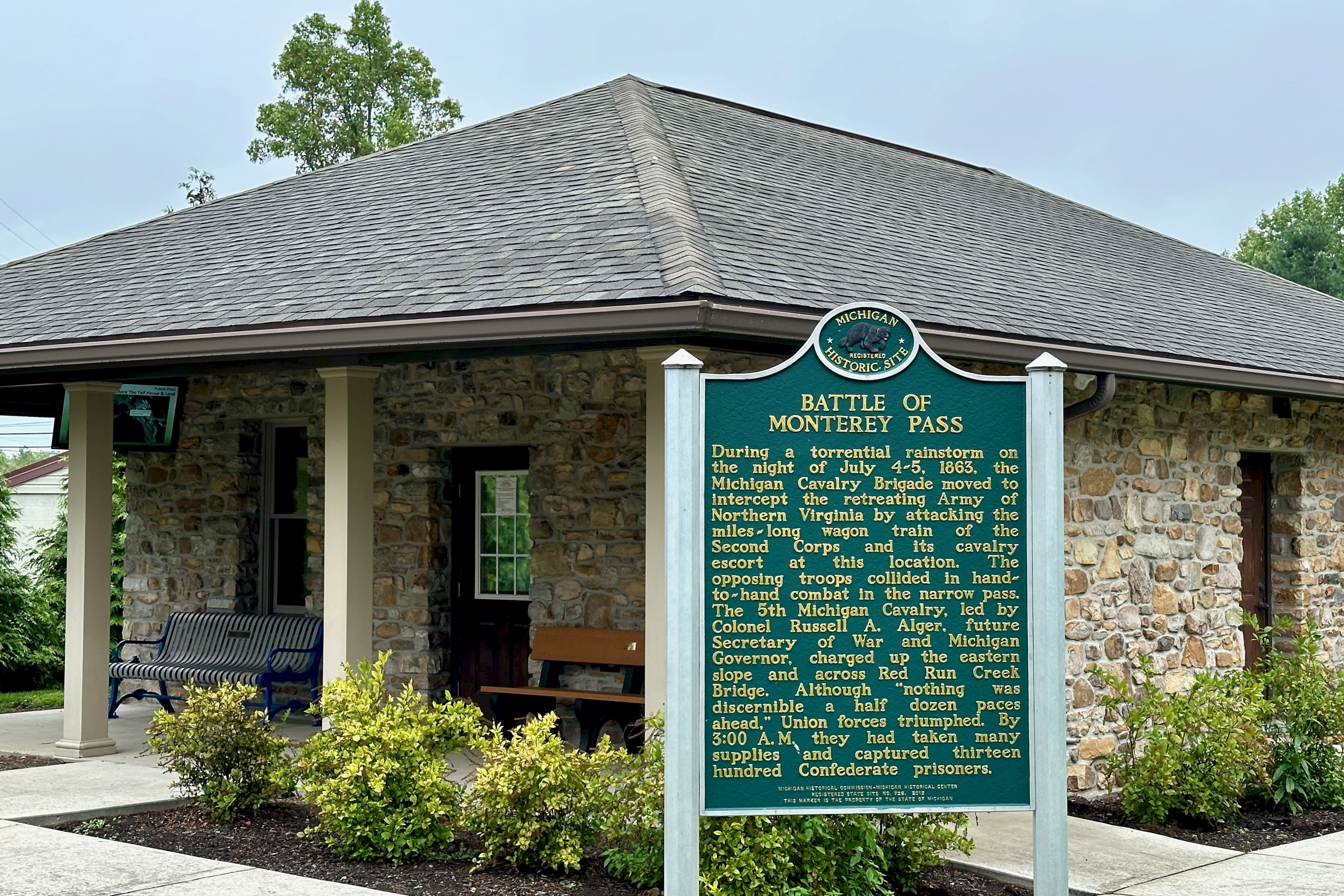
Monterey Pass Battlefield Museum
