= Fairfield Area School District =

School district in Pennsylvania

Coordinates: 39.78200°N 77.37537°W

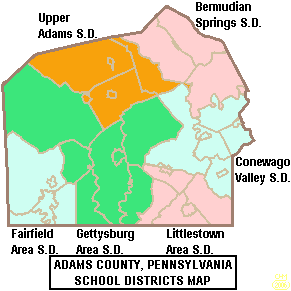
- Map of Adams County school districts

Address
- 4840 Fairfield Road Fairfield, Pennsylvania, U.S. South Central Pennsylvania Fairfield, Adams County, Pennsylvania, 17320-9200; United States

District information
- Grades: K – 12th

Other information
- Website: http://www.fairfieldpaschools.org/

Fairfield Area School District is a small, rural, public school district. It is located in the south western portion of Adams County, Pennsylvania. It serves: the boroughs of Fairfield and Carroll Valley, as well as Hamiltonban Township and Liberty Township. Fairfield Area School District encompasses approximately 61 square miles (160 km^{2}). Per 2000 federal census data, it served a resident population of 7,056. In 2010, Fairfield Area School District's population rose to 7,998 people. The educational attainment levels for the Fairfield Area School District population (25 years old and over) were 87.4% high school graduates and 22.3% college graduates. The district is one of the 500 public school districts of Pennsylvania.

According to the Pennsylvania Budget and Policy Center, 19.5% of the District's pupils lived at 185% or below the Federal Poverty Level as shown by their eligibility for the federal free or reduced price school meal programs in 2012. In 2009, the Fairfield Area School District residents' per capita income was $20,625 a year, while the median family income was $52,087. In the Commonwealth, the median family income was $49,501 and the United States median family income was $49,445, in 2010. In Adams County, the median household income was $59,492. By 2013, the median household income in the United States rose to $52,100. In 2014, the median household income in the USA was $53,700.

According to Fairfield Area School District officials, in school year 2007–2008, the District provided basic educational services to 1,290 pupils. It employed: 94 teachers, 57 full-time and part-time support personnel, and 7 administrators. Fairfield Area School District received more than $4.9 million in state funding in school year 2007–2008. Fairfield Area School District received more than $4.9 million in state funding in school year 2007–2008. By 2013, the District's enrollment had declined to 1,117 students.

Fairfield Area School District operates three schools: Fairfield Area High School (grades 9–12) and Fairfield Area Middle School (grades 5–8) together in the main building and Fairfield Area Elementary School (grades k-4) in a separate building.

== Extracurriculars ==
Fairfield Area School Board offers a variety of clubs, activities and an extensive sports program. The schools' sports teams are known as the Fairfield Green Knights.

The school district has internal programs, including drama and foreign language. It also participates in other programs such as the Adams County Chorus, Adams County Band, and Adjudications. It also has a chapter of the National Honor Society

=== Sports ===
The District funds:

Varsity:

Boys:

- Baseball – AA
- Basketball- AA
- Cross Country – A
- Football – A
- Golf – AA
- Soccer – A
- Track and Field – AA
- Wrestling - AA

Girls:

- Basketball – AA
- Cross Country – A
- Field Hockey – A
- Soccer (Fall) – A
- Softball – AA
- Track and Field – AA
- Volleyball – AA

Middle School sports:

Boys:

- Basketball
- Soccer
- Track and Field
- Wrestling

Girls:

- Basketball
- Field Hockey
- Soccer (Fall)
- Track and Field
- Volleyball

According to PIAA directory July 2016
