= Western Extension =

Western Extension is generally used for any westward expansion of a road, rail line or populated place. It may also have one of the following meanings:

- The Western Extension of the Pennsylvania Turnpike
- Western Extension of a Maryland railroad
- South Carolina Western Extension Railway
- Western Extension Area
