= Liberty Township, Adams County, Pennsylvania =

Township in Pennsylvania, US

Coordinates: 39°45′28″N 77°21′14″W

- Township
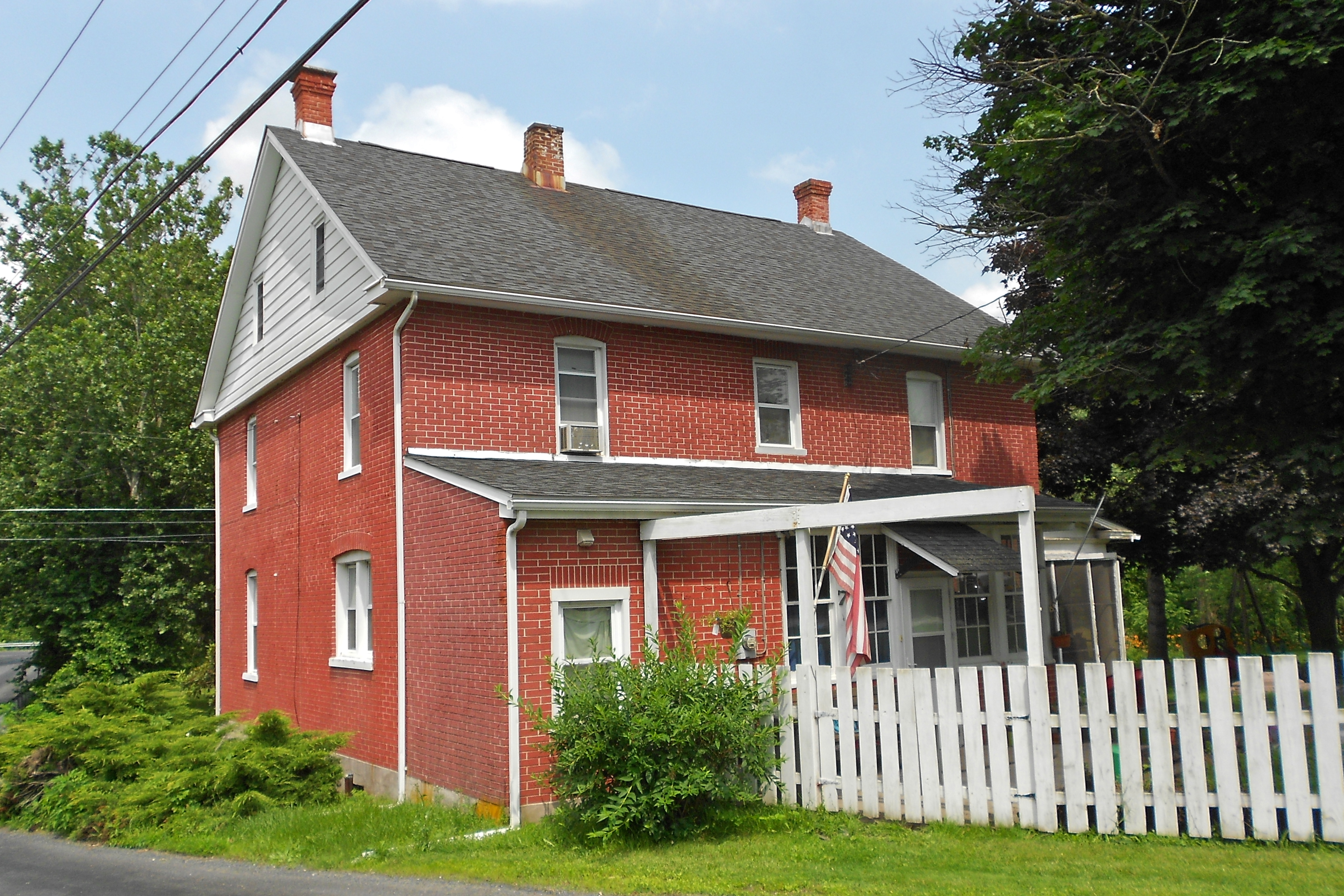
- House in Zora near the state line

- Location in Adams County and the state of Pennsylvania.
- Country: United States
- State: Pennsylvania
- County: Adams
- Settled: 1736
- Incorporated: 1800

Area
  - Total: 16.24 sq mi (42.05 km^{2})
  - Land: 16.23 sq mi (42.03 km^{2})
  - Water: 0.0077 sq mi (0.02 km^{2})

Population (2020)
  - Total: 1,366
  - Estimate (2023): 1,389
  - Density: 76.7/sq mi (29.62/km^{2})
- Time zone: UTC-5 (Eastern (EST))
  - Summer (DST): UTC-4 (EDT)
- Area code: 717
- FIPS code: 42-001-43056
- Website: https://liberty.adamscountypa.gov/

Liberty Township is a township that is located in Adams County, Pennsylvania, United States. The population was 1,237 at the time of the 2010 census.

== Geography ==
According to the United States Census Bureau, the township has a total area of 16.62 square miles (43.05 km^{2}), of which 16.62 square miles (43.04 km^{2}) is land and 0.0077 square miles (0.02 km^{2}), or 0.04%, is water.

The township is split into two sections by the borough of Carroll Valley.

== Demographics ==
Historical population
Census	Pop.	Note	%±
2000	1,063		—
2010	1,237		16.4%
2020	1,366		10.4%
2023 (est.)	1,389		1.7%
U.S. Decennial Census

As of the census of 2000, there were 1,063 people, 407 households, and 326 families residing in the township.

The population density was 65.7 inhabitants per square mile (25.4/km^{2}). There were 433 housing units at an average density of 26.8 per square mile (10.3/km^{2}).

The racial makeup of the township was 98.40% White, 0.19% African American, 0.28% Native American, 0.09% Asian, 0.19% from other races, and 0.85% from two or more races. Hispanic or Latino of any race were 0.19% of the population.

There were 407 households, out of which 34.2% had children under the age of eighteen living with them; 68.3% were married couples living together, 6.4% had a female householder with no husband present, and 19.9% were non-families. 16.2% of all households were made up of individuals, and 6.9% had someone living alone who was sixty-five years of age or older.

The average household size was 2.61 and the average family size was 2.89.

Within the township, the population was spread out, with 25.0% of residents who were under the age of eighteen, 5.7% who were aged eighteen to twenty-four, 29.1% who were aged twenty-five to forty-four, 28.6% who were aged forty-five to sixty-four, and 11.6% who were sixty-five years of age or older. The median age was forty years.

For every one hundred females, there were 100.2 males. For every one hundred females who were aged eighteen years or older, there were 98.8 males.

The median income for a household in the township was $50,833, and the median income for a family was $53,456. Males had a median income of $36,094 compared with that of $27,120 for females.

The per capita income for the township was $22,789.

Approximately 2.1% of families and 3.6% of the population were living below the poverty line, including 3.2% of those who were under the age of eighteen and 7.1% of those who were aged sixty-five or older.
