= Iron Springs, Pennsylvania =

Unincorporated community in Pennsylvania, US

Iron Springs
- Unincorporated community
- Interactive map of Iron Springs
- Coordinates: 39°46′32.34″N 77°23′47.96″W
- Country: United States
- State: Pennsylvania
- County: Adams
- Township: Hamiltonban
- Elevation: 653 ft (199 m)
- Time zone: UTC-5 (EST)
  - Summer (DST): UTC-4 (EDT)
- ZIP Code: 17320
- GNIS Feature ID 1177851

Iron Springs is a South Mountain populated place on Toms Creek, in Adams County, Pennsylvania, United States, located west of Fairfield, that is near the location of the 1822 Maria Furnace.
