= Toms Creek (Monocacy River tributary) =

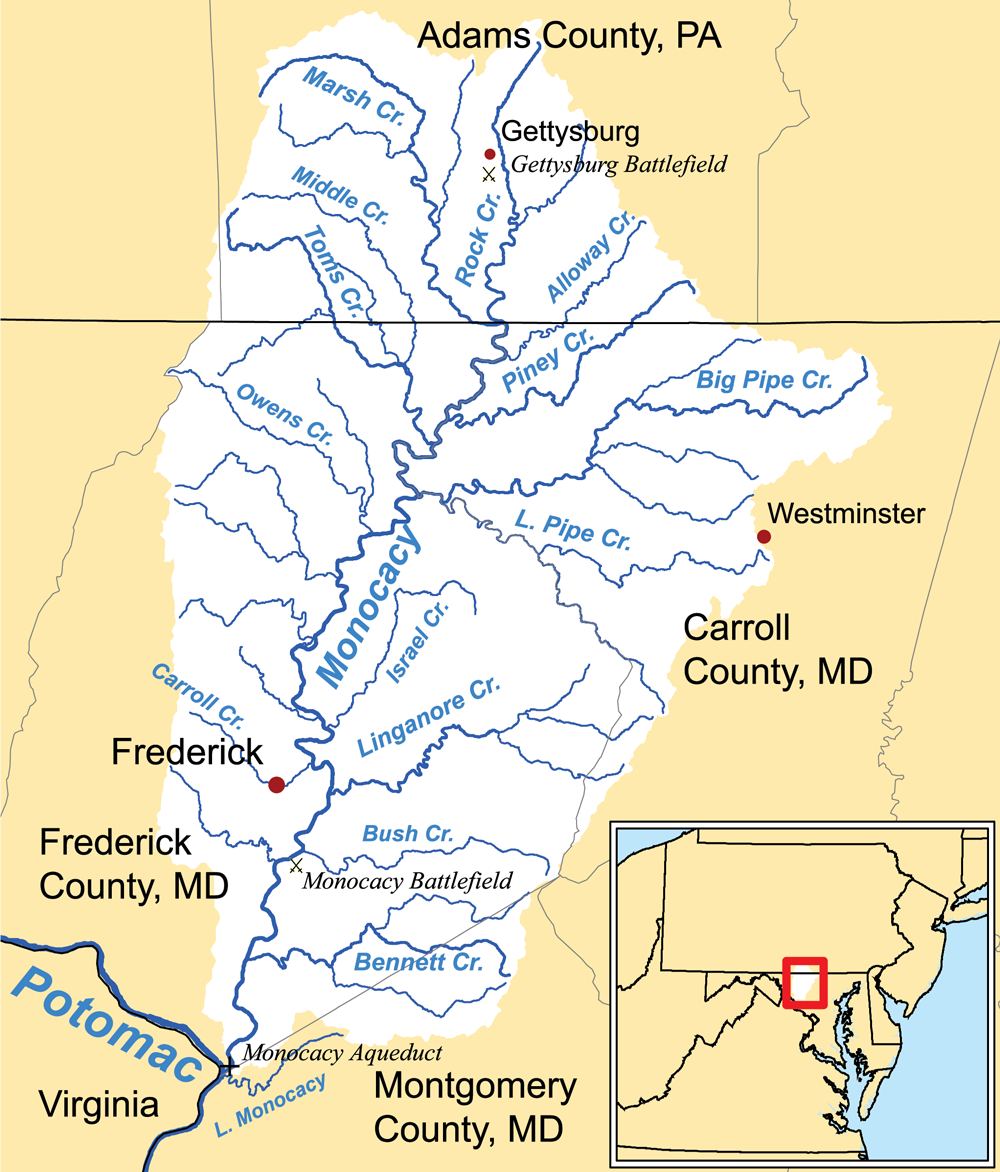
- Monocacy River watershed

Location
- Country: United States
- State: Pennsylvania, Maryland
- Counties: Adams, Frederick

Physical characteristics
- Mouth: Monocacy River
  - coordinates: 39.6397°N 77.2762°W

Basin features
- Tributaries
  - left: Copper Run, Flat Run, Middle Creek
  - right: Miney Branch, Friends Creek, Turkey Creek
- Namesakes: Toms Creek Hundred

Toms Creek is a 20.8-mile-long (33.5 km) tributary of the Monocacy River in Pennsylvania and Maryland in the United States. Via the Monocacy River, it is part of the Potomac River watershed, flowing to the Chesapeake Bay and the Atlantic Ocean.

The creek rises on South Mountain in southwestern Adams County, Pennsylvania, and flows south, then southeast, through Iron Springs and Carroll Valley, Pennsylvania, and past Emmitsburg, Maryland.

Intersections, north-to-south
Intersection	Location/Description	Coordinates
Source		
Perennial flow		39.79466°N 77.44608°W
Bridge	1836 roadway bridge	
Populated place	Maria Furnace	
Bridge	1888 B&H RR (replaced 1912 by the Auburn Shale Brick Company of Gettysburg)	39.772485°N 77.409848°W
Bridge	covered Burr arch	39°46′1″N 77°23′13″W
Confluence	Miney Branch	39.73615°N 77.36874°W
PA/MD state line		
Confluence	Middle Creek	
Mouth	Monocacy River	

== See also ==
- ,List of rivers of Maryland
- List of rivers of Pennsylvania
- Fourpoints Bridge
