= Battle of Fairfield =

Battle of the American Civil War

Battle of Fairfield near Fairfield Gap
- Part of the American Civil War
Date	July 3, 1863
Location	North of Fairfield, Pennsylvania, U.S. 39°49′24″N 77°22′2″W
Result	Confederate victory

Belligerents
(United States) USA (Union)	(Confederate States of America) CSA (Confederacy)

Commanders and leaders
Samuel H. Starr	William E. "Grumble" Jones

Strength
400	1,050 (estimated)

Casualties and losses
242 (6 killed, 28 wounded, 208 missing)	34 (8 killed, 21 wounded, and 5 missing)

The Battle of Fairfield was a cavalry engagement during the Gettysburg campaign of the American Civil War. It was fought July 3, 1863, near Fairfield, Pennsylvania, concurrently with the Battle of Gettysburg, although it was not a formal part of that battle. While a minor fight by the small number of troops deployed, strategically, the Confederate victory secured the important Hagerstown Road, which Robert E. Lee's Army of Northern Virginia would use on July 5 to return to Maryland and then on to safety in Virginia.

== Background ==
Fairfield had been the site of combat on June 21, when the 14th Virginia Cavalry of Brig. Gen. Albert Jenkins's mounted infantry brigade had used Monterey Pass to conduct a raid near Fairfield. Following an engagement with the First Troop, Philadelphia City Cavalry, the Confederates withdrew into the Cumberland Valley.

Much of the cavalry of the Army of Northern Virginia accompanied Maj. Gen. J.E.B. Stuart on his ride around the Union Army of the Potomac through Maryland and south-central Pennsylvania. Lee had retained several brigades to guard the mountain passes as he advanced through the Shenandoah and Cumberland Valleys and to scout Federal positions. Among the latter brigades was that of Brig. Gen. William E. "Grumble" Jones, the celebrated "Laurel Brigade" that had once been commanded by Turner Ashby. Jones had detached one of his best commands, the 35th Battalion, Virginia Cavalry, to accompany the infantry of Jubal Early, but retained the bulk of his command. Jones's Brigade had been raiding the Baltimore and Ohio Railroad in West Virginia and Maryland before being recalled by Lee.

They hastened to Pennsylvania, crossing the Potomac River on July 1, where Jones detached the 12th Virginia Cavalry to guard the ford, and camped at Chambersburg the following night. Jones's force had been reduced to the 6th, 7th, and 11th Virginia Cavalry and Preston Chew's Battery of horse artillery. Jones reached Fairfield on July 3 in response to Lee's orders to secure the vital Hagerstown Road.

Reports of a slow moving Confederate wagon train in the vicinity had attracted the attention of newly commissioned Union Brig. Gen. Wesley Merritt, who ordered the 6th U.S. Cavalry under Maj. Samuel H. Starr to scout Fairfield and locate the wagons. Once in Fairfield, Major Starr learned that a wagon train had just rolled out of town and was heading to Cashtown. He divided his 400 men into three detachments and began to search for the wagons.

== Battle ==
One party soon encountered the pickets of Jones's 7th Virginia Cavalry and withdrew when additional Confederates rode up. Informed of the presence of the enemy, Starr rode to a small ridge and dismounted his men in fields and an orchard on both sides of the road. He threw back a mounted charge of the 7th Virginia, just as Chew's Battery unlimbered and opened fire on the Federal cavalrymen. Supported by the 6th Virginia, the 7th Virginia charged again, clearing Starr's force off the ridge and inflicting heavy losses. Jones pursued the retreating Federals for three miles to the Fairfield Gap, but was unable to catch his quarry.

== Aftermath ==
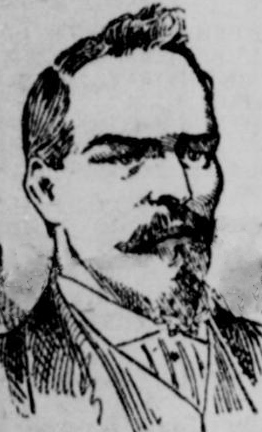
George Crawford Platt

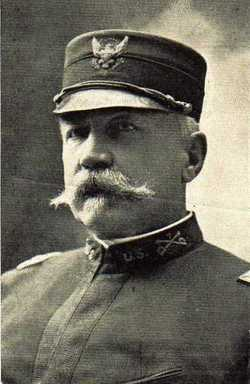
Louis H Carpender

Federal losses were 6 killed, 28 wounded, and 208 unaccounted for—primarily prisoners. The losses for the Confederates were 8 killed, 21 wounded, and 5 missing.

Jones camped near Fairfield and kept the road open for Lee's retreat, then guarded the rear as the Army of Northern Virginia slogged through the Fairfield Gap in a driving rainstorm on July 5.

Sgt. Martin Schwenk, a German immigrant later named George Martin, was awarded the Medal of Honor on April 23, 1889, for his actions in the Battle of Fairfield. His citation credits his "bravery in an attempt to carry a communication through the enemy's lines; also rescued an officer from the hands of the enemy." Pvt. George C. Platt, an Irish immigrant serving in Troop H of the 6th U.S. Cavalry, was awarded the Medal of Honor on July 12, 1895, for his actions at Fairfield. His citation reads, "Seized the regimental flag upon the death of the standard bearer in a hand-to-hand fight and prevented it from falling into the hands of the enemy." His commander was Lt. Louis H. Carpender, who was awarded the Medal of Honor in the Indian wars.

After the fighting had ended, many wounded soldiers were cared for in the town of Fairfield. Major Samuel H. Starr was taken to the widow Sarah Amanda Blythe's house, which is likely where his arm was amputated. Other accounts mention that the Rufus C. Swope House (across from the Fairfield Inn), and St. John's Lutheran Church were used as hospitals. It is probable that other buildings in the town were used for this purpose as well.

== See also ==
- Fairfield Historic District (Fairfield, Pennsylvania)
