= Middle Creek (Toms Creek tributary) =

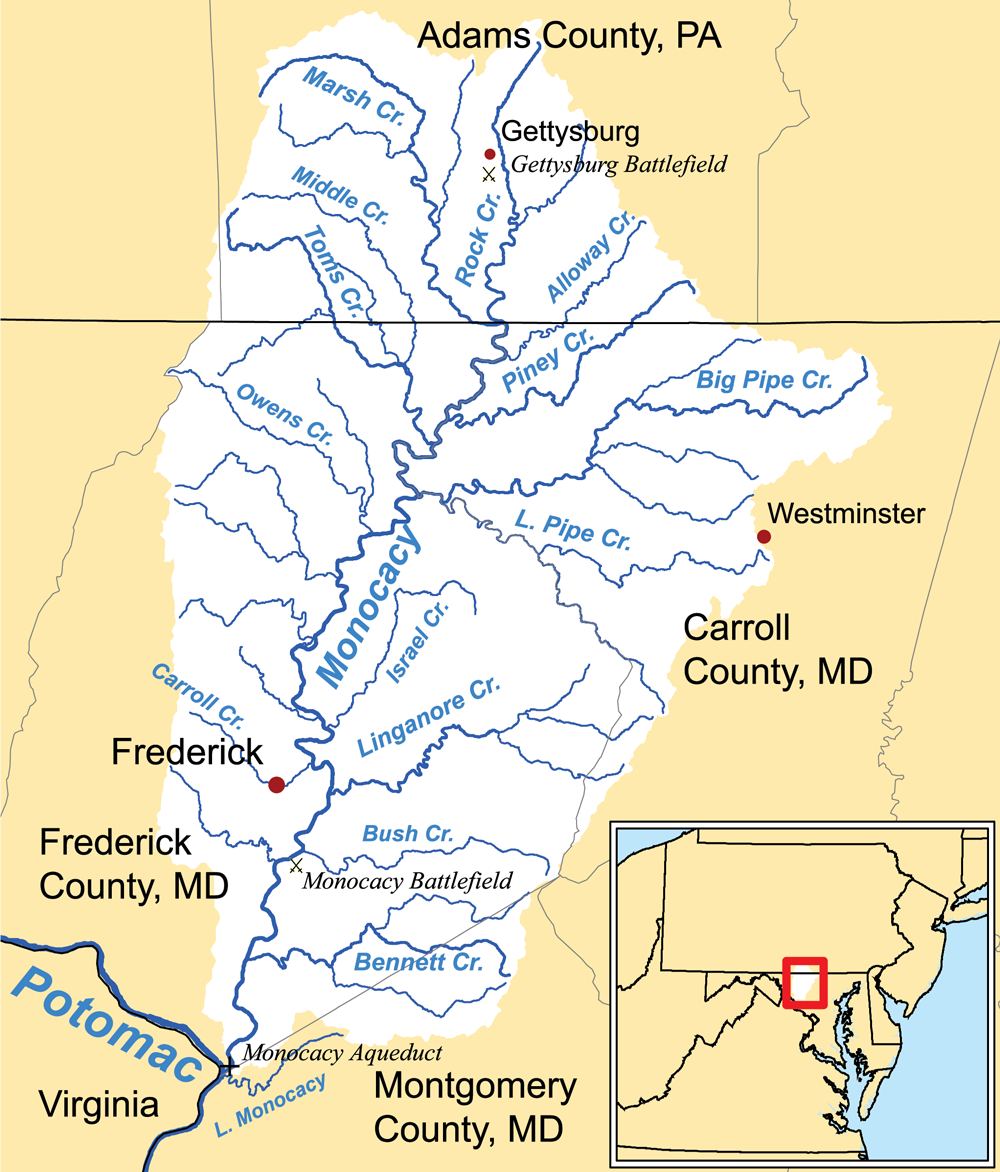
- Monocacy River watershed

- Location of the mouth Middle Creek (Toms Creek tributary) (Pennsylvania)

Location
- Country: United States
- State: Pennsylvania, Maryland
- Counties: Adams, Frederick

Physical characteristics
- Mouth: Toms Creek
  - coordinates: 39.6846°N 77.2962°W

Middle Creek is a 17.1-mile-long (27.5 km) tributary of Toms Creek in Pennsylvania and Maryland in the United States.

Middle Creek is born on the eastern slope of the Blue Ridge Mountains, and from there flows through Adams County, Pennsylvania and Frederick County, Maryland to join Toms Creek near Emmitsburg.

Water from Middle Creek flows via Toms Creek, the Monocacy River, and the Potomac River to the Chesapeake Bay and eventually the Atlantic Ocean.

Intersections, north-to-south
| Intersection | Location/Description | Coordinates |
| Source | South Mountain | |
| Perennial point | | 39.80132°N 77.44149°W |
| confluence | Swamp Creek | |
| confluence | Spring Run | |
| confluence | Muddy Run | |
| state line | Adams County, Pennsylvania & Frederick County, Maryland | |
| mouth | Toms Creek | |

== See also ==
- List of rivers of Maryland
- List of rivers of Pennsylvania
