= Western Extension (Baltimore and Harrisburg Railway) =

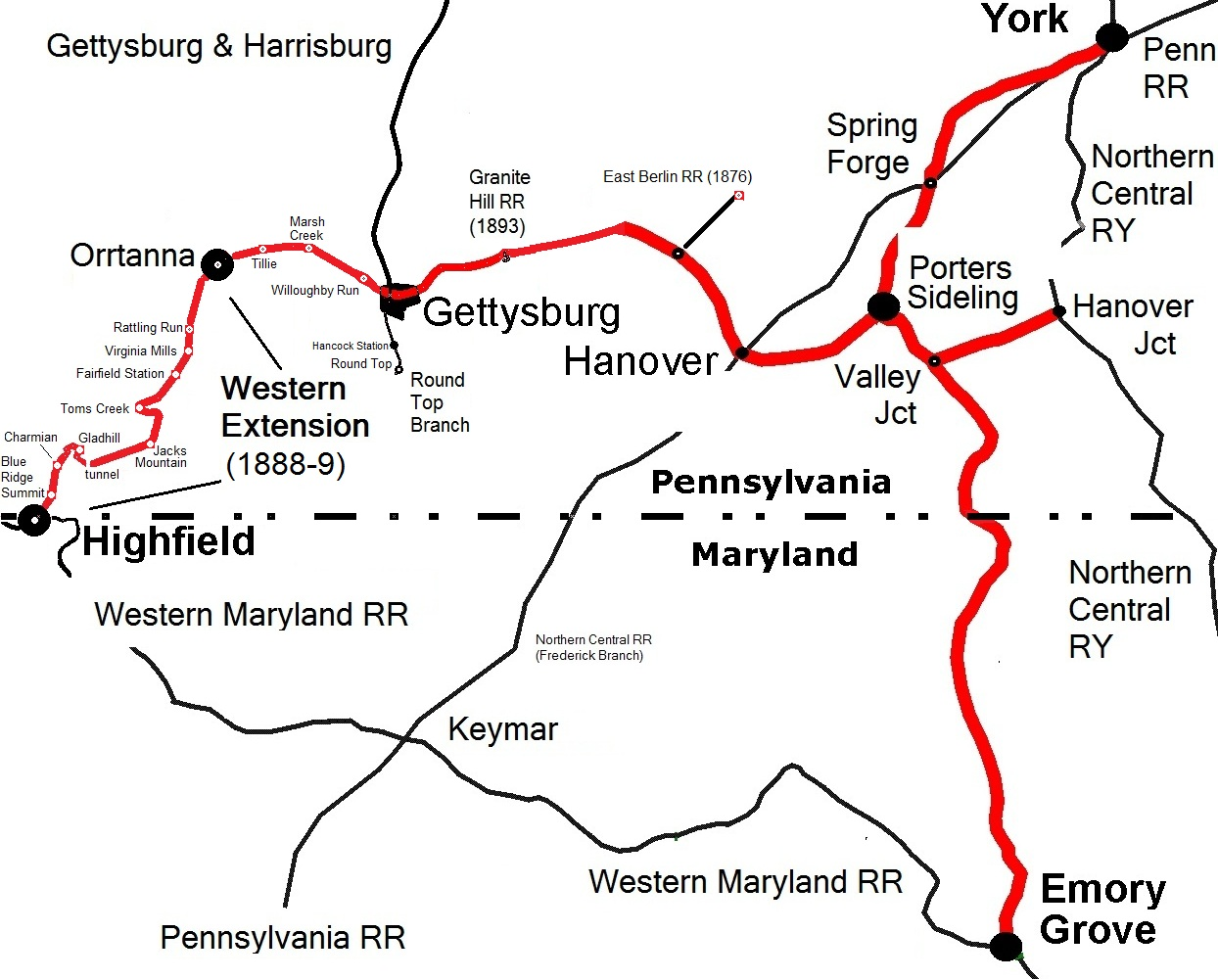
Stations of the Baltimore and Harrisburg Railway's Western Extension (left)

The Western Extension is a Western Maryland section of railway line between Highfield-Cascade, Maryland, and Gettysburg, Pennsylvania. The extension of the Hanover Junction, Hanover and Gettysburg Railroad westward from the Gettysburg Battlefield to Marsh Creek (Monocacy River) was completed in 1884, crossing the north-south Gettysburg and Harrisburg Railroad and its 1884 Round Top Branch in the borough (site of a 1909 Reading and Western Maryland collision of freight trains.) The line was completed to Orr Station by June 30, 1885, then after an 1886 merger formed the Baltimore and Harrisburg Railway, the 15 mi (24 km) to the mainline at Highland near the Mason–Dixon line was completed in 1888-1889. The B&H leased their line to the Western Maryland Railway until the WM purchased it in 1917. The Western Extension used portions of the 1830s Tapeworm Railroad bed (e.g., the McPherson Ridge railway cut on the Gettysburg Battlefield) and required construction of the Jacks Mountain Tunnel south of Maria Furnace.
