= Fourpoints Bridge =

- U.S. National Register of Historic Places
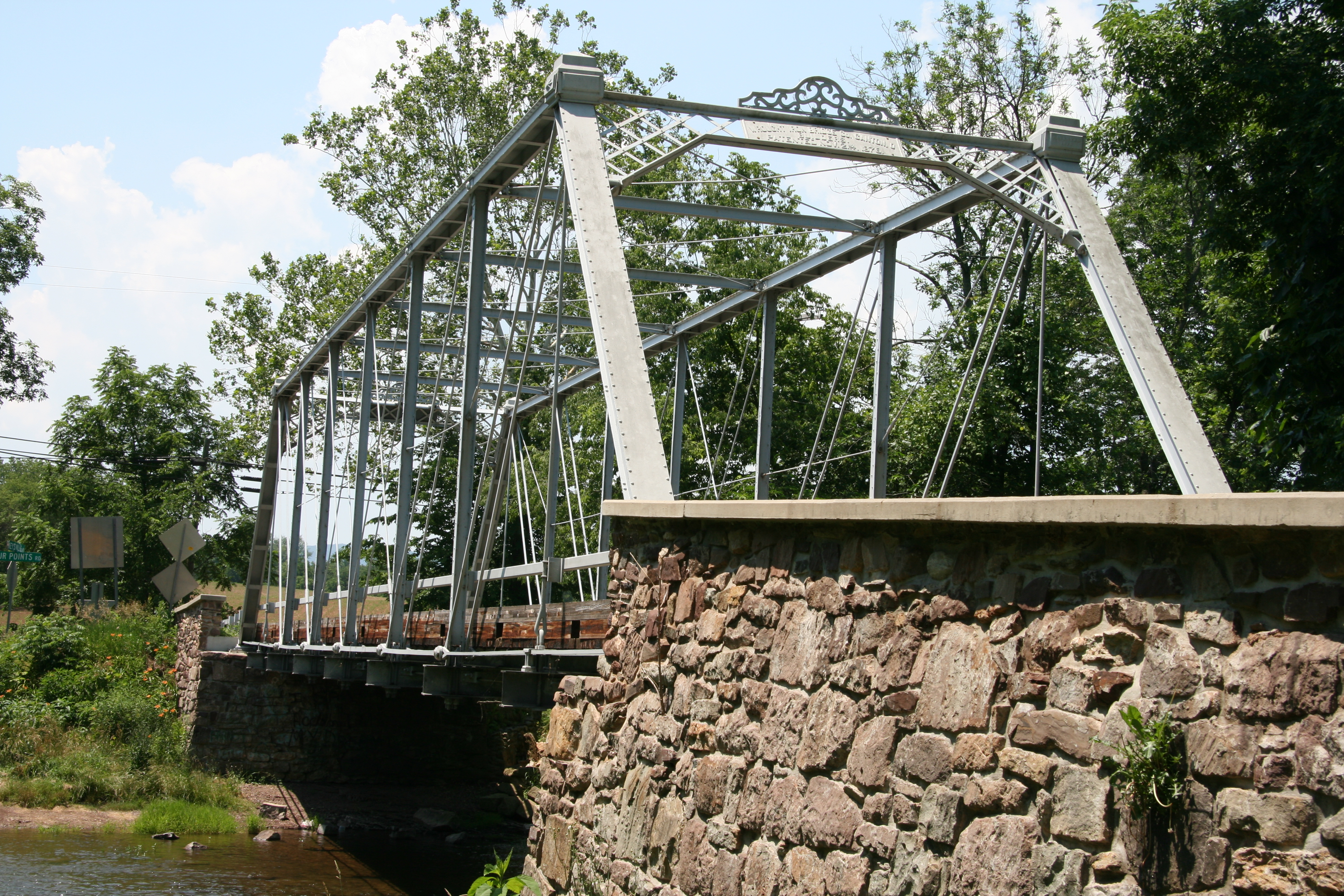

- Location within Maryland Location within the United States
- Location: Southeast of Emmitsburg, Emmitsburg, Maryland
- Coordinates: 39°40′17″N 77°18′4″W
- Area: 0.2 acres (0.081 ha)
- Built: 1876
- Built by: Wrought Iron Bridge Co.
- Architectural style: Pratt truss
- NRHP reference No.: 78001457
- Added to NRHP: November 29, 1978

The Fourpoints Bridge, near Emmitsburg, Maryland is a wrought iron bridge by the Wrought Iron Bridge Company of Canton, Ohio. The bridge crosses Toms Creek and is similar to the Poffenberger Road Bridge elsewhere in Frederick County. The 103-foot Pratt truss bridge remains in daily use.
