= Fairfield Historic District (Fairfield, Pennsylvania) =

Historic district in Pennsylvania, United States

- U.S. National Register of Historic Places
- U.S. Historic district
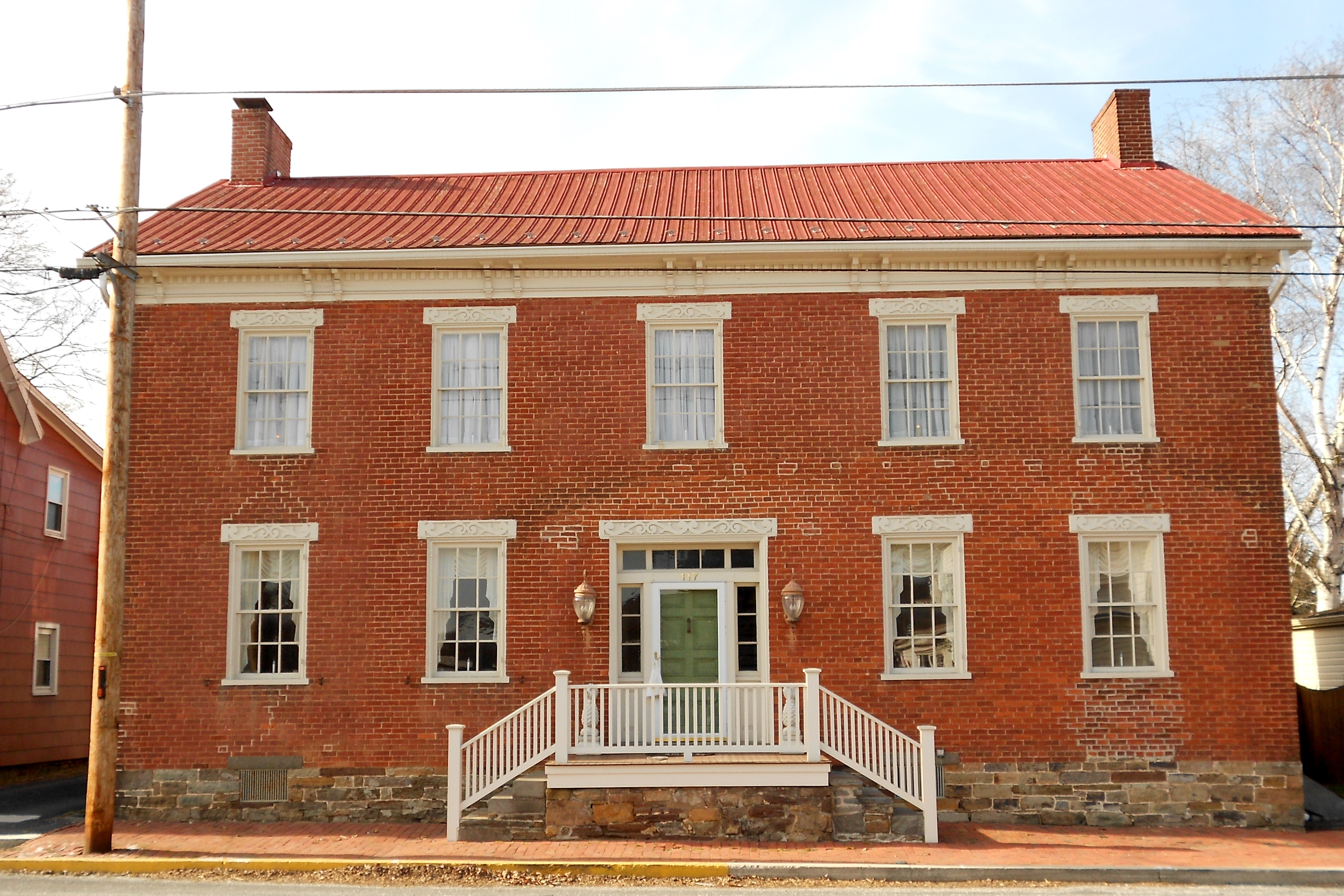

- Location within Pennsylvania Location within the United States
- Location: Roughly bounded by Landis Dr., Steelman St., Wortz Dr., and NW border Fairfield Borough, Fairfield, Pennsylvania
- Coordinates: 39°47′36″N 77°22′10″W
- Area: 169.5 acres (68.6 ha)
- Built: 1863; 163 years ago
- Architectural style: Greek Revival, Italianate, et al.
- MPS: Adams County properties associated with the Battle of Gettysburg MPS
- NRHP reference No.: 00000518
- Added to NRHP: May 18, 2000

Fairfield Historic District is a national historic district located at Fairfield in Adams County, Pennsylvania, United States. The district includes 117 contributing buildings, 1 contributing site, and 2 contributing structures. It encompasses the central business district and surrounding residential areas of Fairfield, including the Daniel Musselman Farm. They primarily date from the late-18th to the mid-19th century. It includes several homes used as hospitals following the July 3, 1863, 6th U.S. Cavalry skirmish during the Battle of Fairfield of the Gettysburg campaign. The Musselman Farm property served as the field hospital for Johnson's Division of the Confederate States Army. Notable buildings include the John Miller Manor House (1797), Greek Revival architecture-style Musselman Farmhouse and stone / frame barn complex, Lutheran and Roman Catholic churches, Mrs. Blythe House, and R.C. Swope House. Located in the district is the separately listed Fairfield Inn.

It was listed on the National Register of Historic Places in 2000.
