= Jacks Mountain Tunnel =

- Interactive map of Jacks Mountain Tunnel

Overview
- Location: Fairfield, Pennsylvania
- Coordinates: 39.744687°N 77.443035°W
- Status: Active

Operation
- Opened: 1889
- Owner: CSX
- Traffic: Train
- Character: Freight

Technical
- Length: 540 ft (160 m)
- No. of tracks: Single
- Track gauge: 1,435 mm (4 ft 8 1/2 in) standard gauge
- Min elevation: 1164 ft (355 m)
- Grade: 0.698%

Jacks Mountain Tunnel is a railroad tunnel located in Adams County, Pennsylvania about 2.5 miles (4.0 km) southwest of Fairfield. It was built in 1889 by the Baltimore and Harrisburg Railway, which was later acquired by the Western Maryland Railway. The tunnel is currently owned by CSX Transportation and operates as part of the Hanover Subdivision.
