= Fairfield Inn (Fairfield, Pennsylvania) =

- U.S. National Register of Historic Places
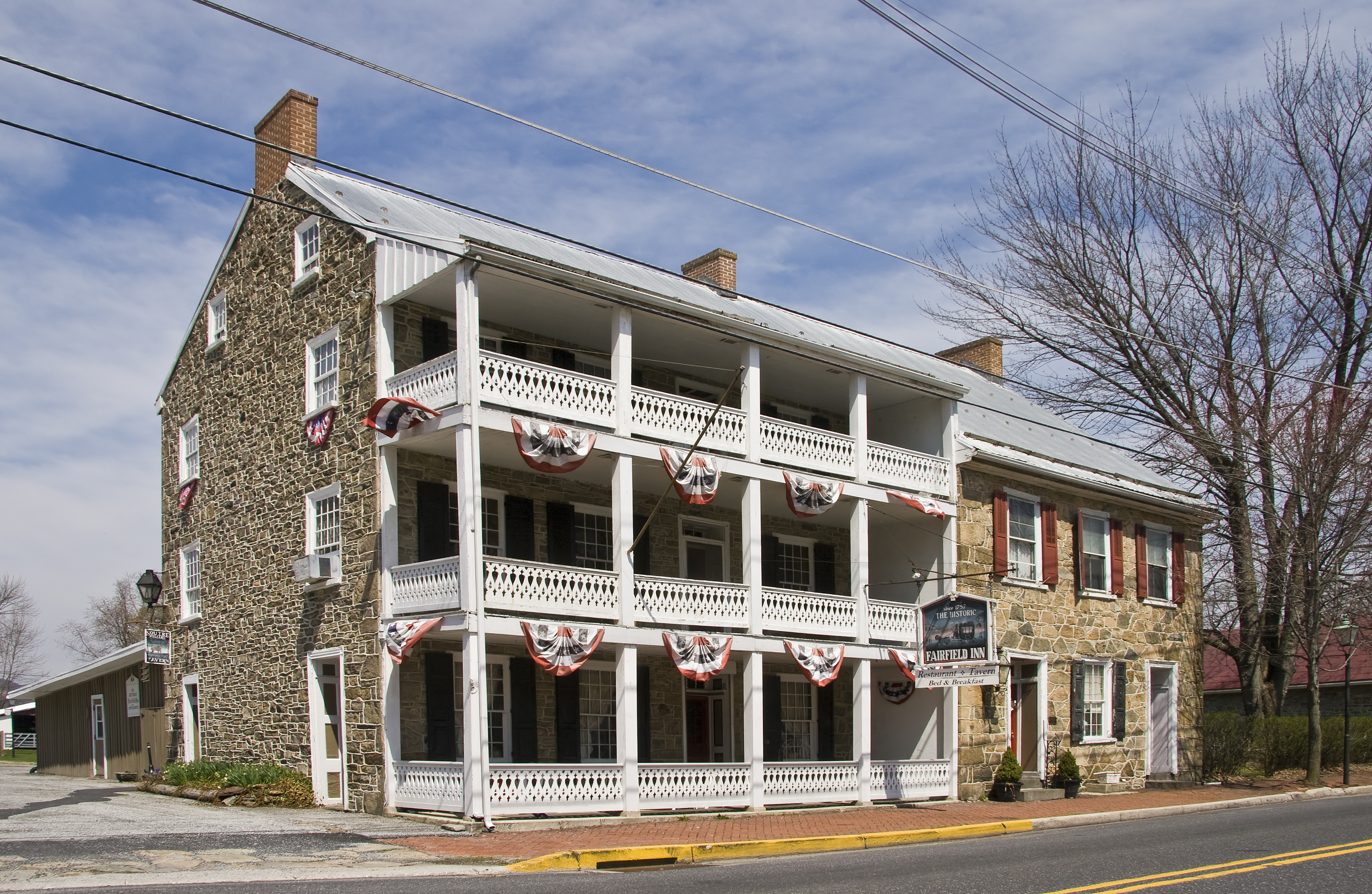
- Fairfield Inn, April 2011

- Location within Pennsylvania Location within the United States
- Location: 15 W Main St., Fairfield, Pennsylvania
- Coordinates: 39°47′13.2″N 77°22′10.7″W
- Area: 1 acre (0.40 ha)
- Built: 1787-1789 (the oldest portion)
- Architectural style: Gothic
- NRHP reference No.: 73001583
- Added to NRHP: April 2, 1973

Fairfield Inn, also known as The Mansion House, is a historic inn and tavern in Fairfield, Adams County, Pennsylvania, United States.

== Architecture ==
Fairfield Inn is a 3 1/2-story, stone structure with a gable roof. It features a three-story Victorian Gothic-style porch.

== History ==
The tavern property was part of a larger tract of land of 247 acres that was conveyed on December 19, 1755 to John Miller by Charles Carroll of Maryland. Tax records from the Adams County Historical Society indicate that the oldest section of the Fairfield Inn dates to the late 1760s. During the Civil War period, the tavern was operated by Peter Shively, who filed a claim for damages done to his property by the Confederate Army after the Battle of Gettysburg in 1863. These losses included lard, oats, corn, whiskey, brandy, win, gin, and rum. The damages totaled $278.

The Fairfield Inn was added to the National Register of Historic Places on April 2, 1973. It is located in the Fairfield Historic District. In August 2007, Governor Ed Rendell personally delivered and presented to the Innkeepers, the Chandon family, the House of Representatives Citation 'celebrating 250 consecutive years in business' reaffirming the longevity and distinction The Fairfield Inn played in the area's history - attested by PA House Representative Daniel Moul and Speaker of the House, Dennis M. O'Brien.

== See also ==
- Contributing property
- Cultural landscape
- Historic preservation
- Keeper of the Register
- List of heritage registers
- Property type (National Register of Historic Places)
- United States National Register of Historic Places listings
- State Historic Preservation Office
