= Carroll Valley, Pennsylvania =

Borough in Pennsylvania, US

- Borough
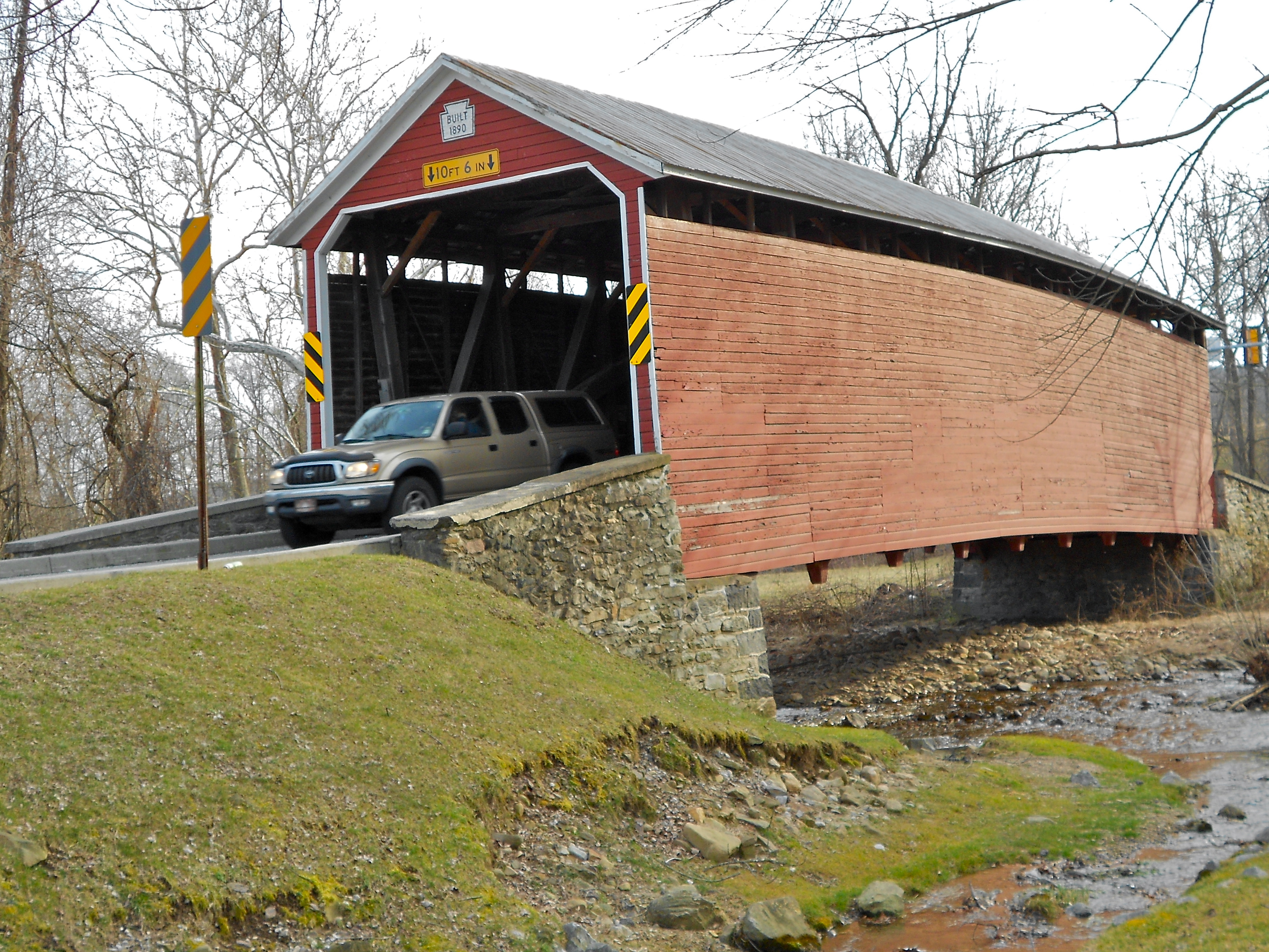
- Jacks Mountain Covered Bridge

- Seal

- Location in Adams County and the U.S. state of Pennsylvania.

- Location in Pennsylvania and the United States Carroll Valley (the United States)
- Coordinates: 39°44′52″N 77°22′44″W
- Country: United States
- State: Pennsylvania
- County: Adams
- Incorporated: 1974

Government
  - Type: Borough Council
  - Mayor: Ronald J. Harris

Area
  - Total: 5.45 sq mi (14.12 km^{2})
  - Land: 5.38 sq mi (13.93 km^{2})
  - Water: 0.073 sq mi (0.19 km^{2})
- Elevation: 807 ft (246 m)

Population (2020)
  - Total: 3,940
  - Density: 732.7/sq mi (282.91/km^{2})
- Time zone: UTC-5 (Eastern (EST))
  - Summer (DST): UTC-4 (EDT)
- Zip Code: 17320 (Fairfield)
- Area code: 717
- FIPS code: 42-11472
- Website: www.carrollvalley.org

Carroll Valley is a borough in Adams County, Pennsylvania, United States. The population was 3,940 at the 2020 census.

== Geography ==
Carroll Valley is located at 39°44′52″N 77°22′44″W (39.747668, -77.378846). According to the U.S. Census Bureau, the borough has a total area of 5.5 square miles (14 km^{2}), of which 5.4 square miles (14 km^{2}) is land and 0.1 square miles (0.26 km^{2}) (1.10%) is water.

== Demographics ==
Historical population
Census	Pop.	Note	%±
1980	817		—
1990	1,457		78.3%
2000	3,291		125.9%
2010	3,876		17.8%
2020	3,940		1.7%

=== 2020 census ===
As of the 2020 census, Carroll Valley had a population of 3,940. The median age was 45.6 years. 19.9% of residents were under the age of 18 and 18.4% of residents were 65 years of age or older. For every 100 females there were 96.0 males, and for every 100 females age 18 and over there were 94.5 males age 18 and over.

0.0% of residents lived in urban areas, while 100.0% lived in rural areas.

There were 1,509 households in Carroll Valley, of which 29.2% had children under the age of 18 living in them. Of all households, 63.4% were married-couple households, 12.5% were households with a male householder and no spouse or partner present, and 18.2% were households with a female householder and no spouse or partner present. About 18.7% of all households were made up of individuals and 10.2% had someone living alone who was 65 years of age or older.

There were 1,595 housing units, of which 5.4% were vacant. The homeowner vacancy rate was 1.0% and the rental vacancy rate was 3.2%.

Racial composition as of the 2020 census
Race	Number	Percent
White	3,643	92.5%
Black or African American	11	0.3%
American Indian and Alaska Native	10	0.3%
Asian	19	0.5%
Native Hawaiian and Other Pacific Islander	1	0.0%
Some other race	48	1.2%
Two or more races	208	5.3%
Hispanic or Latino (of any race)	81	2.1%

=== 2000 census ===
As of the census of 2000, there were 3,291 people, 1,176 households, and 952 families residing in the borough. The population density was 610.4 inhabitants per square mile (235.7/km^{2}). There were 1,261 housing units at an average density of 233.9 per square mile (90.3/km^{2}). The racial makeup of the borough was 96.81% White, 0.61% African American, 0.43% Native American, 0.40% Asian, 0.24% from other races, and 1.52% from two or more races. Hispanic or Latino of any race were 0.79% of the population.

There were 1,176 households, out of which 43.5% had children under the age of 18 living with them, 71.9% were married couples living together, 5.6% had a female householder with no husband present, and 19.0% were non-families. 14.0% of all households were made up of individuals, and 4.0% had someone living alone who was 65 years of age or older. The average household size was 2.80 and the average family size was 3.08.

In the borough, the population was spread out, with 29.7% under the age of 18, 4.9% from 18 to 24, 35.2% from 25 to 44, 21.6% from 45 to 64, and 8.7% who were 65 years of age or older. The median age was 35 years. For every 100 females there were 100.4 males. For every 100 females age 18 and over, there were 101.3 males.

The median income for a household in the borough was $54,659, and the median income for a family was $55,000. Males had a median income of $40,135 versus $27,090 for females. The per capita income for the borough was $21,286. About 1.7% of families and 2.2% of the population were below the poverty line, including 2.0% of those under age 18 and 2.5% of those age 65 or over.

== Parks and recreation ==
Carroll Valley Borough has three lakes (two offer public fishing and boating), two recreation areas, several auxiliary playing fields and a pavilion with picnic area. Carroll Commons hosts a large playground, picnic area and a pavilion. The park has a beach volleyball court, basketball court, bocce court, horseshoe pits, and shuffle board. Public restroom facilities are open from dawn to dusk daily on the Commons grounds from April 15 until October 1.

== Education ==
It is in the Fairfield Area School District.
