= Maria Furnace, Pennsylvania =

Unincorporated community in Pennsylvania, US

Maria Furnace
- Unincorporated community
- Location within Pennsylvania
- Coordinates: 39°46′30″N 77°24′18″W
- Country: United States
- State: Pennsylvania
- County: Adams
- Township: Hamiltonban
- Time zone: UTC-5 (EST)
  - Summer (DST): UTC-4 (EDT)
- ZIP Code: 17320
- Area code: 717
- GNIS ID: 1180406

Maria Furnace is a South Mountain populated place on Toms Creek in Adams County, Pennsylvania, United States, west of Fairfield, that was the location of an 1822 blast furnace until operations were moved to Caledonia. The remains of the original blast furnace ("Maria Furnace") are located at coordinates: 39|46|30.64 N, 77|24|25.98 W. The remains consist of a pile of rocks in a small wooded area overgrown with vegetation.
