= Fairfield, Pennsylvania =

Borough in Pennsylvania, US

- Borough
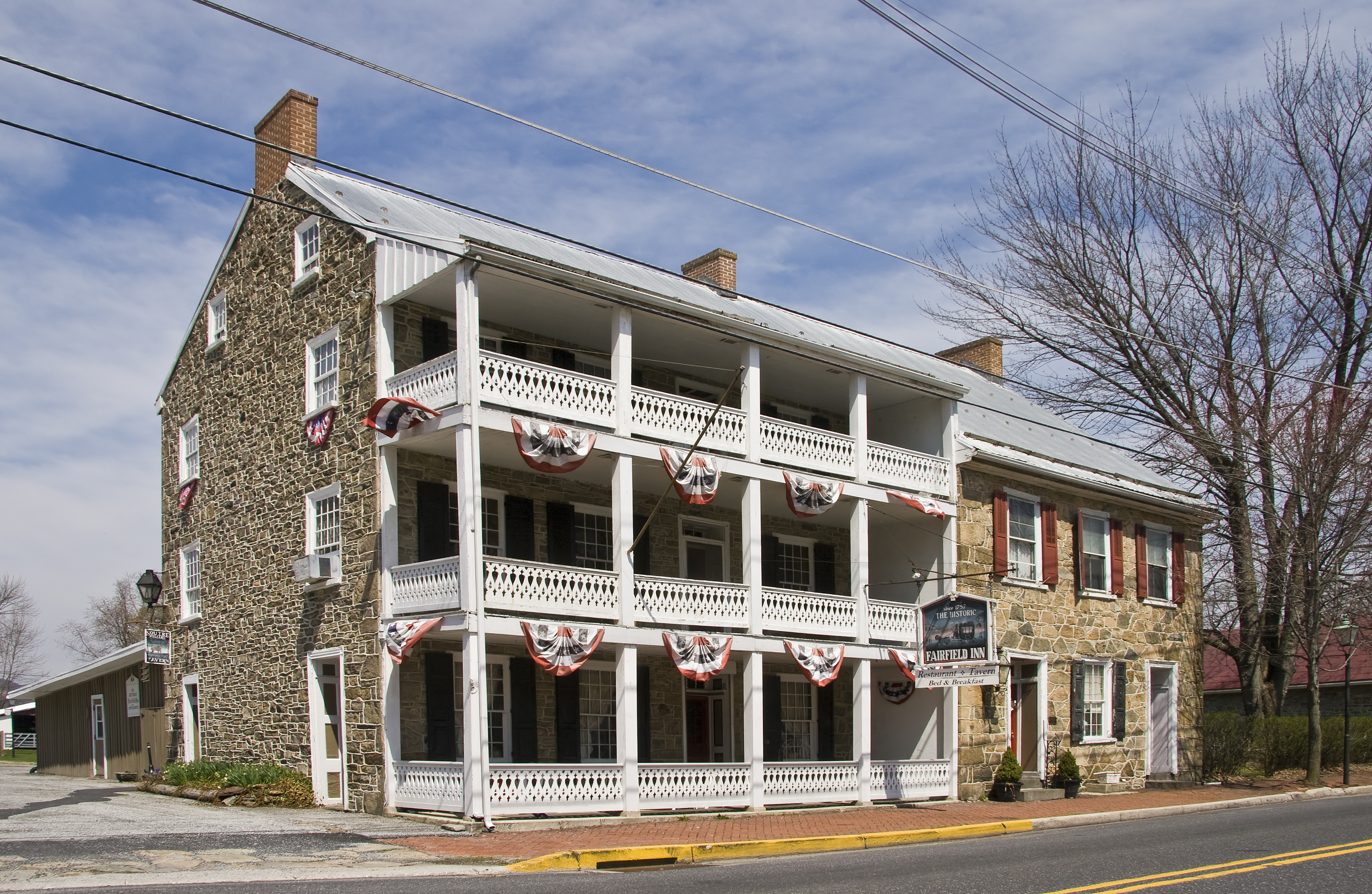
- The historic Fairfield Inn

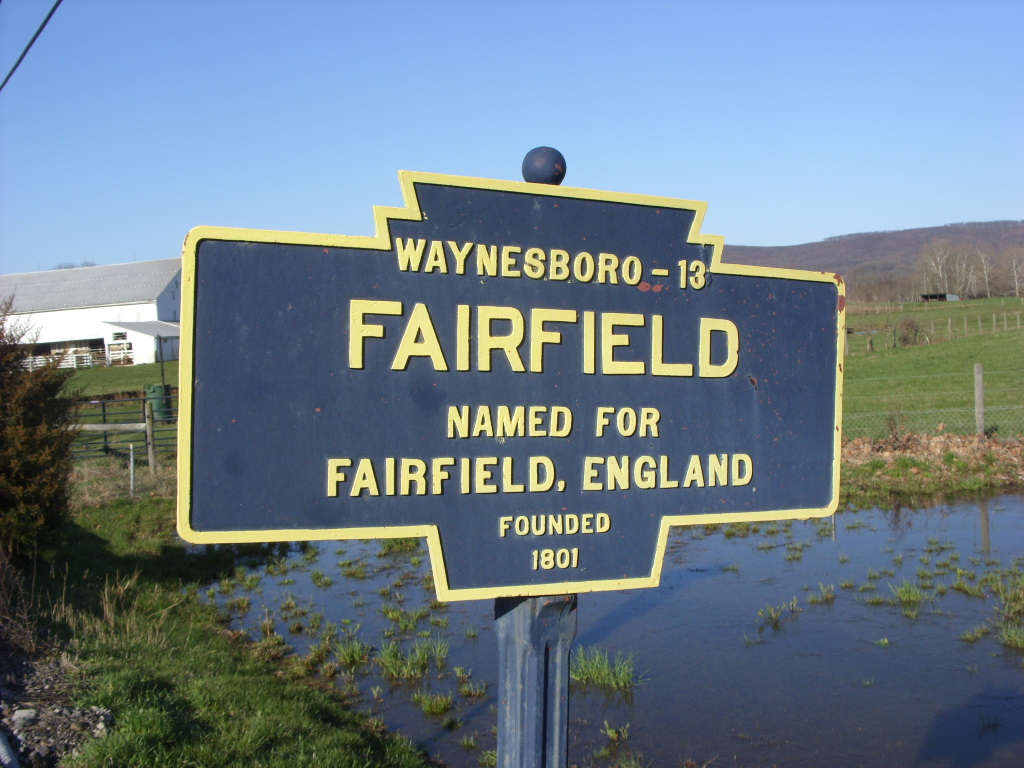
- Keystone Marker

- Location in Adams County and the U.S. state of Pennsylvania.

- Location in Pennsylvania and the United States Fairfield (the United States)
- Coordinates: 39°47′14″N 77°22′10″W
- Country: United States
- State: Pennsylvania
- County: Adams
- Settled: 1801
- Incorporated: 1896

Government
  - Type: Borough Council
  - Mayor: Robert R. Stanley

Area
  - Total: 0.67 sq mi (1.74 km^{2})
  - Land: 0.67 sq mi (1.74 km^{2})
  - Water: 0 sq mi (0.00 km^{2})
- Elevation: 597 ft (182 m)

Population (2020)
  - Total: 526
  - Density: 781.8/sq mi (301.86/km^{2})
- Time zone: UTC-5 (Eastern (EST))
  - Summer (DST): UTC-4 (EDT)
- ZIP code: 17320
- Area codes: 717 and 223
- FIPS code: 42-24560
- Website: fairfieldborough.com

Fairfield is a borough in Adams County, Pennsylvania, United States. The population was 526 at the 2020 census.

== History ==
During the Gettysburg campaign in the American Civil War, the Battle of Fairfield played an important role in securing the Fairfield pass and the Hagerstown Road, enabling Robert E. Lee's Army of Northern Virginia to retreat through Fairfield towards the Potomac River. The actual fighting near Fairfield was between elements of the 6th United States Cavalry under Major Samuel Starr, and elements of General "Grumble" Jones' Brigade of Virginia Cavalry. The Union casualties were treated in the town of Fairfield, specifically in the homes of Mrs. Sarah Amanda Blythe, Rufus Christian Swope, and in what is now St. John's Lutheran Church. For more information on the town of Fairfield, see Fairfield In the Civil War, by Sarah Sites Thomas, Tim Smith, Gary Kross, and Dean S. Thomas. The Fairfield Historic District and Fairfield Inn are listed on the National Register of Historic Places.

== Geography ==
Fairfield is located at 39°47′14″N 77°22′10″W (39.787260, -77.369399).

According to the United States Census Bureau, the borough has a total area of 0.7 square miles (1.8 km^{2}), all land.

== Demographics ==
Historical population
Census	Pop.	Note	%±
1850	171		—
1860	218		27.5%
1870	258		18.3%
1900	395		—
1910	373		−5.6%
1920	401		7.5%
1930	387		−3.5%
1940	431		11.4%
1950	451		4.6%
1960	519		15.1%
1970	547		5.4%
1980	591		8.0%
1990	524		−11.3%
2000	486		−7.3%
2010	507		4.3%
2020	526		3.7%

As of the census of 2000, there were 486 people, 232 households, and 139 families residing in the borough. The population density was 708.2 people per square mile (273.4 people/km^{2}). There were 245 housing units at an average density of 357.0 per square mile (137.8/km^{2}). The racial makeup of the borough was 98.35% White, 0.62% Asian, 0.41% from other races, and 0.62% from two or more races. Hispanic or Latino of any race were 0.62% of the population.

There were 232 households, out of which 25.9% had children under the age of 18 living with them, 50.4% were married couples living together, 7.3% had a female householder with no husband present, and 39.7% were non-families. 36.6% of all households were made up of individuals, and 21.1% had someone living alone who was 65 years of age or older. The average household size was 2.09 and the average family size was 2.67.

In the borough the population was spread out, with 20.8% under the age of 18, 3.7% from 18 to 24, 26.1% from 25 to 44, 25.5% from 45 to 64, and 23.9% who were 65 years of age or older. The median age was 45 years. For every 100 females there were 86.9 males. For every 100 females age 18 and over, there were 84.2 males.

The median income for a household in the borough was $31,053, and the median income for a family was $39,219. Males had a median income of $28,750 versus $21,250 for females. The per capita income for the borough was $17,243. About 0.7% of families and 3.5% of the population were below the poverty line, including 2.0% of those under age 18 and 7.2% of those age 65 or over.

== Education ==
The Fairfield Area School District, which includes the borough, is located in south central Pennsylvania on the Maryland border. It has an elementary, middle, and high school located in Fairfield. Its sports teams are named the Knights.

== Transportation ==
The Mid-Atlantic Soaring Center Airport is located two miles from Fairfield. It has one 2,700-foot asphalt runway.

== Popular culture ==
A fictional version of Fairfield is featured in the first-person shooter game Left 4 Dead. The first campaign of the game, No Mercy, takes place in and around a fictional Mercy Hospital within the borough.
