= An Impression of John Steinbeck: Writer =

1969 film

- Directed by: Donald Wrye
- Produced by: Donald Wrye
- Narrated by: Henry Fonda
- Distributed by: United States Information Agency
- Release date: 1969
- Running time: 22 minutes
- Country: United States
- Language: English

An Impression of John Steinbeck: Writer is a 1969 American short documentary film directed by Donald Wrye, about John Steinbeck. It was nominated for an Academy Award for Best Documentary Short.

== See also ==
- Henry Fonda filmography
