= Frederick W. Füger =

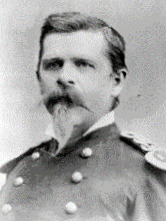
- Born: June 18, 1836; Göppingen, Kingdom of Württemberg, German Confederation
- Died: October 13, 1913 (aged 77); Washington, D.C., US
- Burial place: Arlington National Cemetery
- Military career
- Allegiance: United States; Union
- Branch: United States Army; Union Army
- Service years: 1856–1900
- Rank: Lieutenant Colonel
- Commands: Battery A, 4th U.S. Artillery
- Conflicts: Indian Wars; Seminole Wars; American Civil War • Battle of White Oak Swamp • Battle of Antietam • Battle of Gettysburg • Battle of Dinwiddie Court House
- Awards: Medal of Honor

Frederick W. Füger (June 18, 1836 – October 13, 1913) was a German American enlisted man and officer in the U.S. Army. He received the Medal of Honor for gallantry during the Battle of Gettysburg while defending the Union position on Cemetery Ridge against Pickett's Charge on July 3, 1863.

== Military service ==
Emigrating from his native Germany in 1853, Füger joined the 4th U.S. Artillery in 1856 and was assigned to Battery A. He saw service in Florida in 1856 against the Seminoles, Kansas in 1857, Utah in 1858 against the Mormons, and Nevada in 1860 against the Paiutes.

Füger's five-year enlistment was set to expire in 1861 when Confederate forces fired during the Battle of Fort Sumter, the first engagement of the American Civil War. He reenlisted and was promoted to 1st sergeant of Battery A, 4th U.S. Artillery under the command of Lt. Alonzo Cushing. During the Battle of Gettysburg in July 1863, Füger was defending Cemetery Ridge during the Confederate infantry assault known as Pickett's Charge. After Lt. Alonzo Cushing and 2nd Lt. Joseph Milne were mortally wounded, Füger took command of the battery and continued to fire the single remaining gun under the pressure of approaching Confederates. Confederate soldiers under the command of Brig. General Lewis Armistead managed to breach the stone wall, landing among the forward guns. Füger's men engaged in hand-to-hand to drive the Confederates off the field. Füger was awarded the Medal of Honor for this action and also received a commission as 2nd lieutenant in the U.S Army.

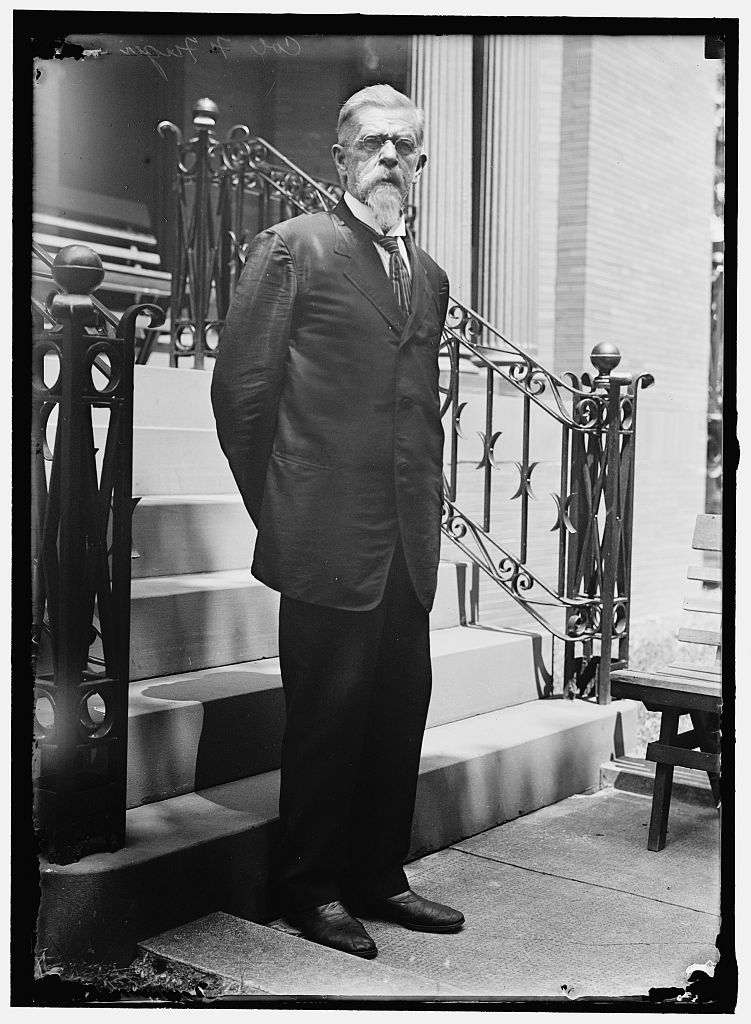
Frederick Füger in 1913

By his own account, Füger was present at 63 Civil War battles and minor engagements, being wounded twice, once in the head at the Battle of White Oak Swamp on June 30, 1862, and once in the left arm at the Battle of Antietam, on September 17, 1862.

- Füger was brevetted 1st lieutenant U.S. Army for gallant and meritorious services in the Battle of Dinwiddie Court House, March 31, 1865.
- Promoted to 1st Lieutenant 4th Artillery in December 1865.
- Promoted to captain 4th Artillery, March 1887.
- Promoted to major 4th Artillery February 13, 1899.
- Compulsory retirement for age in June 1900, age 64
- In April 1904, after an Act of Congress, Füger was promoted to lieutenant colonel U.S. Army.

=== Medal of Honor citation ===
Citation:

The President of the United States of America, in the name of Congress, takes pleasure in presenting the Medal of Honor to Sergeant Frederick W. Füger, United States Army, for extraordinary heroism on 3 July 1863, while serving with Battery A, 4th U.S. Artillery, in action at Gettysburg, Pennsylvania. All the officers of his battery having been killed or wounded and five of its guns disabled in Pickett's assault, Sergeant Füger succeeded to the command and fought the remaining gun with most distinguished gallantry until the battery was ordered withdrawn.

== See also ==
- List of Medal of Honor recipients for the Battle of Gettysburg
- List of American Civil War Medal of Honor recipients: A–F

== Notes ==
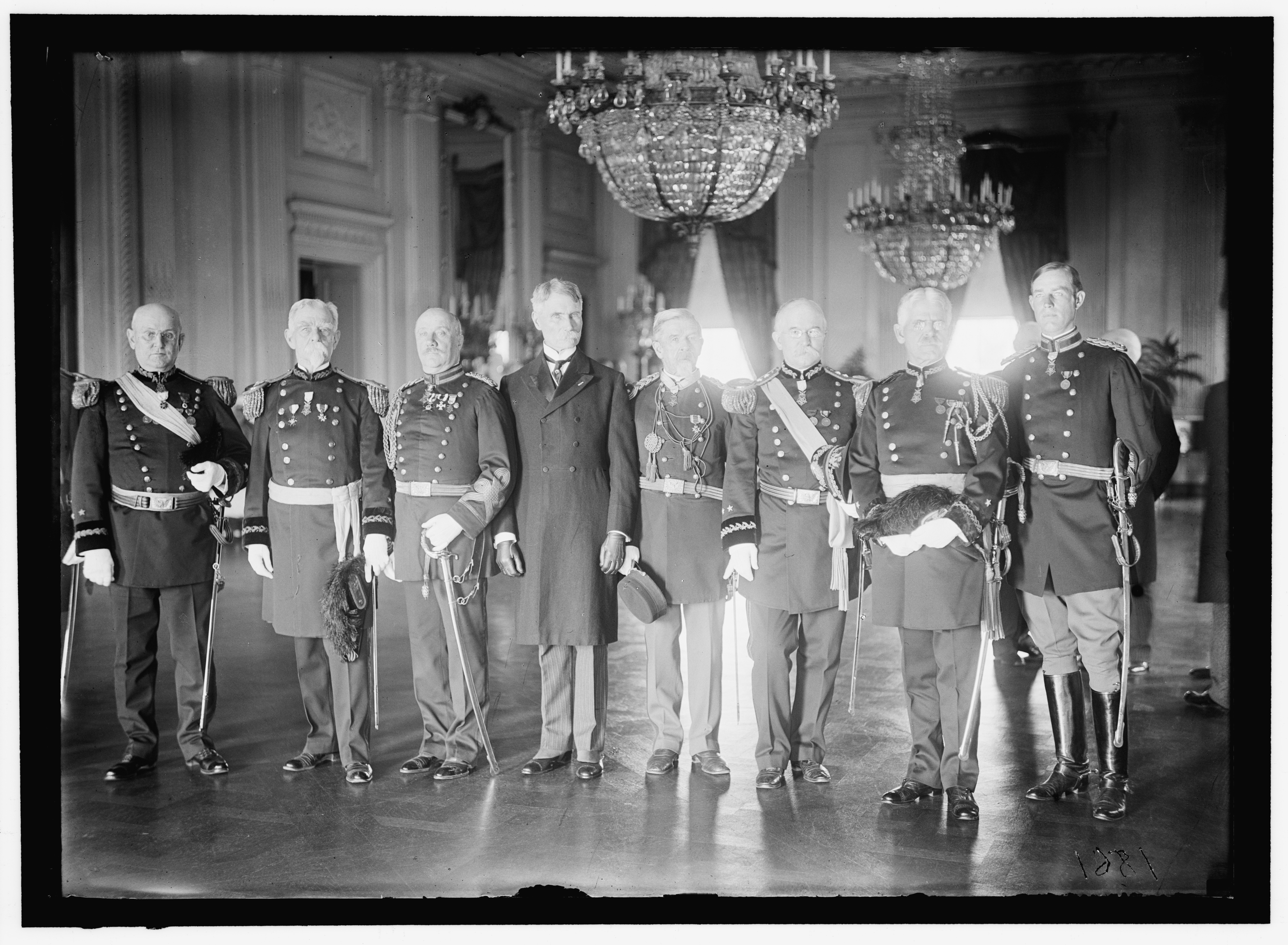
COL Frederick Füger. (5th from left)
