= Howard B. Cushing =

American soldier (1838-1871)

Howard Bass Cushing
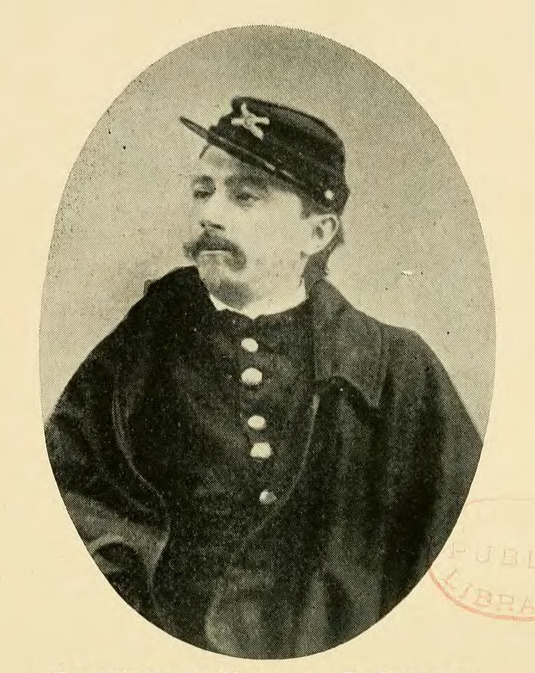
- Born: August 22, 1838; Milwaukee, Wisconsin
- Died: May 5, 1871 (aged 32); Whetstone Mountains, Arizona Territory
- Burial place: San Francisco National Cemetery; San Francisco, California
- Relatives: Alonzo Cushing (brother); William B. Cushing (brother)
- Military career
- Allegiance: United States of America
- Branch: United States Army
- Service years: 1861–1871
- Rank: First Lieutenant
- Conflicts: American Civil War; Indian Wars

Howard Bass Cushing (August 22, 1838–May 5, 1871) was an American soldier during the American Civil War and the Indian Wars, who was killed by the Apache during a campaign in Arizona Territory. Cushing was five foot, seven inches tall and described as "spare, sinewy, and active as a cat" with "keen gray or bluish green eyes." His physical stature and reputation as an Indian fighter made him renowned throughout the young American southwest immediately following the end of the Civil War.

== Military service and family ==
Because of his conquests and accomplishments, including the events that led to his death in 1871, Cushing was called "The Custer of Arizona." In addition, Cushing's brother Alonzo Cushing was in fact a classmate of George Armstrong Custer at the United States Military Academy at West Point.

He served in the Union Artillery throughout the Civil War, first volunteering as a private in the 1st Illinois Light Artillery and later earning a Federal Commission as a Second Lieutenant in the 4th U.S. Artillery upon his brother's death.

Cushing belonged to a family which won renown throughout the Civil War. One brother, William Barker Cushing, defeated a Confederate ironclad, the CSS Albemarle; another, Alonzo Cushing, died at his post of duty on the battlefield of Gettysburg in the Union Army, earning him a belated (2014) Medal of Honor. Throughout Howard Cushing's career, he tried to measure up to his brothers' successes. It was said that his family felt that he had been unluckily placed and had thus been engaged in only half a dozen battles.

By the end of 1867, Cushing was promoted to First Lieutenant in Troop F of the 3rd Cavalry, serving first in western Texas and then southern Arizona. It has been said that he and his troops had killed more Apaches than any other officer or troop of the US Army.

== Ambushing an Apache Camp ==
In May 1870, Cushing and a force of U.S. cavalrymen were pursuing an Apache raiding party. Cushing had a loyal Apache scout as his guide. The Apache scout Manuel Duran with his tracking skills located the Apache camp. Cushing waited till dark and then had his cavalrymen surround it quietly. Cushing, his cavalrymen, and Manuel Duran took hidden positions around the camp. Cushing gave the signal to attack, and his force opened a heavy fire. The Apache warriors who were taken by surprise were decimated. 30 Apache warriors were killed. Some women and children were captured. Tragically, an Apache child was also killed in the crossfire. Manuel Duran the scout aimed and killed an Apache warrior while accidentally killing the child that enemy warrior was holding in attempt to take the child to safety. After surprising and defeating this Apache raiding party, Cushing reported to his superiors that his force suffered no casualties while killing 30 enemy combatants and accidentally killing a child caught in the crossfire. No other civilian casualties were reported. This U.S. cavalry victory under Cushing may have been possible because they had a loyal Apache scout with them who knew when and where to track a hidden Apache raiding camp. The scout knew the tricks and tactics that his brethren used to strike and evade the U.S. armed force. Plus, the captured Apache women claimed that the killed warriors drank medicine from a medical wagon train they raided which dulled their senses and decreased their fighting effectiveness.

== Cushing Massacre ==
Cushing was charged with pursuing Chiricahua Apache elements under Chief Cochise, who had recently broken a winter truce in the Tucson area in 1871. Cushing and 22 troopers pursued the Apache elements south towards the Mexican border, which was often used as a sanctuary when pursued by US forces.

On May 5, 1871, Cushing came into contact with an Apache element approximately fifteen miles north of today's Fort Huachuca, in an area known as Bear Spring in the Whetstone Mountains. This element was not led by Chief Cochise, but reportedly by the chief named Juh, who was known for stating his desire to kill Cushing. Cushing and his lead element were immediately ambushed, resulting in the deaths of Lieutenant Cushing, Private Martin Green, and a Mr. Simpson; a Private Pierce was wounded. Several horses were killed and wounded. The battle was described as fierce, and reduced to hand-to-hand combat. Cushing's non-commissioned officer, Sergeant John Mott, managed to rescue the wounded and lead a successful retreat with the remainder of the troopers. Within 48 hours three US Cavalry Troops were dispatched from Fort Crittenden to pursue the Apaches, and found Cushing's body with his fellow fallen troopers, who were all stripped of their clothing and left by the Apaches.

General Orders 11 was released by the Headquarters Department of Arizona on June 2, 1871 announcing his death "while gallantly leading his command in an attack against the band of Indians." Cushing was buried at Fort Lowell, northwest of Tucson. He was later reinterred at San Francisco National Cemetery in the Presidio of San Francisco.

== Legacy ==
Cushing Street and the Cushing Street Bar, both located in downtown Tucson, Arizona are named in Cushing's honor. A monument that honors Alonzo, William, and Howard Cushing is located at Cushing Memorial Park in Delafield, Wisconsin. Howard Cushing seems to be the inspiration for the character Lietenant Colonel Owen Thursday, played by Henry Fonda in director John Ford 1948 western Fort Apache, with Fonda's Owen Thursday bearing a lot of similarities to Howard Cushing, from appearance, to fighting Cochise, to having a similar death, though Ford says the film was inspired by the Fetterman Fight and the Battle of Little Bighorn.

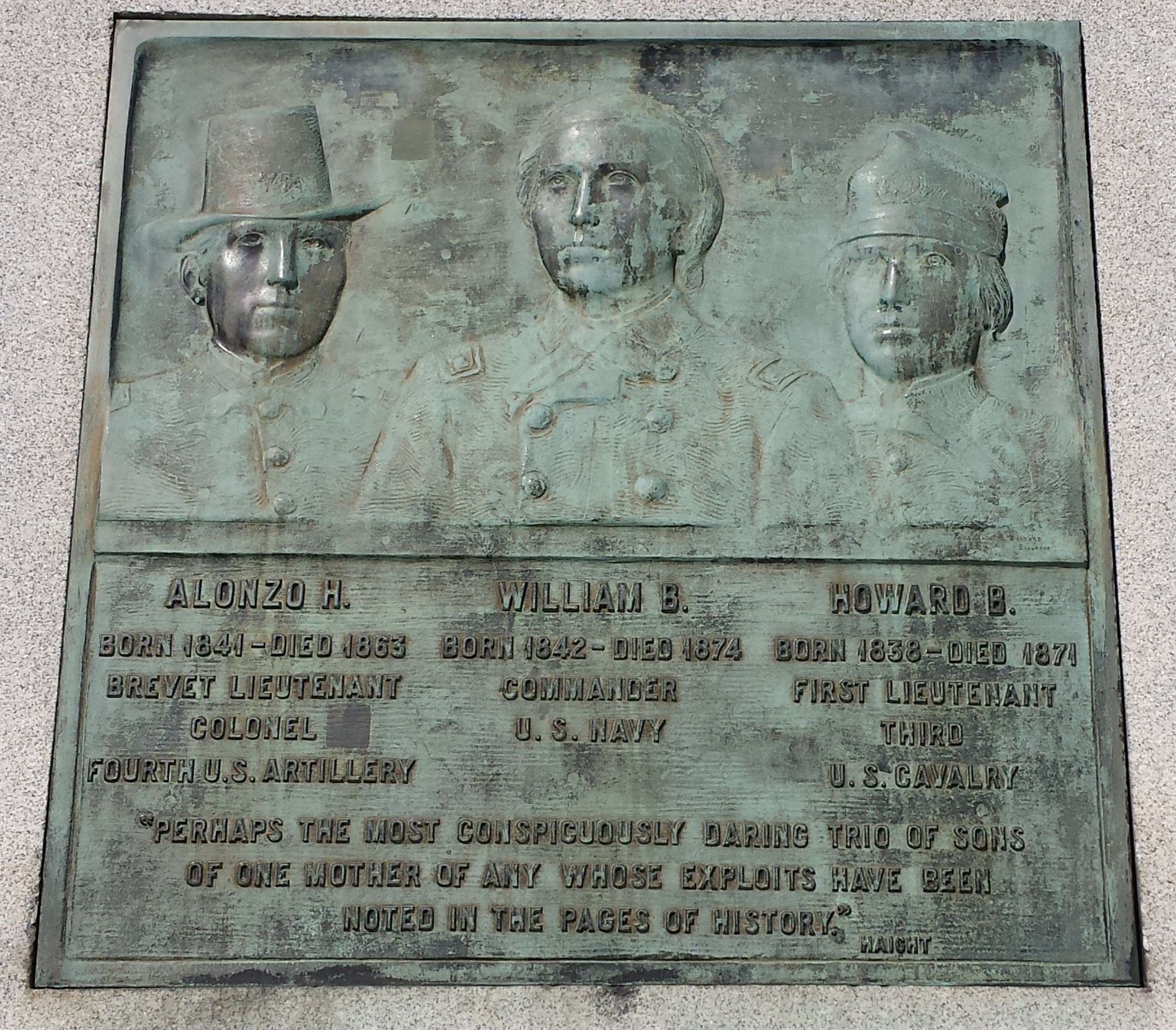
Cushing Memorial Park Monument Plaque

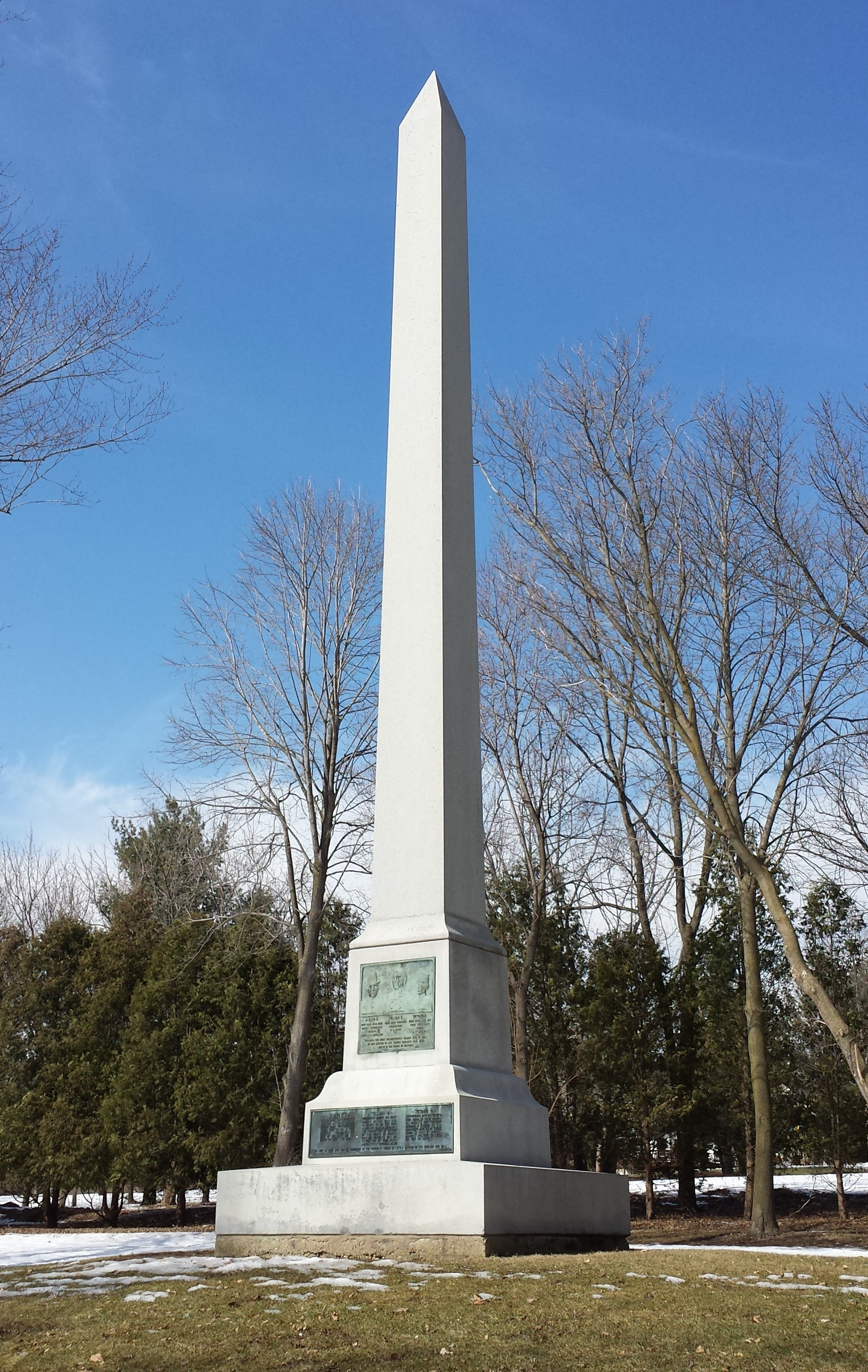
Cushing Memorial Park Monument
