= The Dirty Game =

1965 film

- US release film poster by Reynold Brown
- Directed by: Christian-Jaque; Werner Klingler; Carlo Lizzani; Terence Young
- Written by: Philippe Bouvard; Jacques Caborie; Christian-Jaque; Ennio De Concini; Jo Eisinger; Jacques Rémy
- Produced by: Richard Hellman; Eugène Tucherer
- Starring: Henry Fonda; Vittorio Gassman; Annie Girardot; Robert Ryan
- Cinematography: Richard Angst
- Edited by: Franco Fraticelli
- Music by: Robert Mellin; Gian Piero Reverberi
- Distributed by: American International Pictures
- Release date: 23 June 1965
- Running time: 118 minutes
- Countries: United States; West Germany; France; Italy
- Language: English

The Dirty Game (German: Spione unter sich, French: Guerre secrète, Italian: La guerra segreta) is a 1965 anthology spy film starring Henry Fonda, Vittorio Gassman, Bourvil and Robert Ryan. Ryan's character, American General Bruce, is the link between three different spy stories, helmed by different directors; original James Bond director Terence Young and co-director Werner Klingler for the sequences in Berlin, Christian-Jaque for the French sequences, and Carlo Lizzani for the Italian sequences.

== Plot ==
American General Bruce tells of three different spy missions he took part in.

== Cast ==
- Henry Fonda as Dimitri Koulov
- Robert Ryan as General Bruce
- Vittorio Gassman as Perego / Ferrari (French)
- Annie Girardot as Suzette / Monique (French)
- Bourvil as Lalande
- Robert Hossein as Dupont
- Peter van Eyck as Petchatkin
- Maria Grazia Buccella as Natalia
- Mario Adorf as Callaghan
- Jacques Sernas as Sernas
- Georges Marchal as Serge
- Wolfgang Lukschy as Russian General
- Louis Arbessier as Ivanov
- Jackie Blanchot as Joe
- Gabriel Gobin as O'Hara
- Helmut Wildt as Perry
- Violette Marceau as Lisa
- Klaus Kinski as Russian Agent

== See also ==
- List of American films of 1965
- Henry Fonda filmography
- Klaus Kinski filmography
