= Fort Apache =

Fort Apache may refer to:

== Arts and entertainment ==
- Fort Apache (film), a 1948 John Ford film starring John Wayne
- Fort Apache, The Bronx (film), a 1981 crime drama film starring Paul Newman
- Fort Apache Napoli, a 2009 Italian film
- Fort Apache Studios, an American music recording studio
- Fort Apache, a fictional location in the TV series The Adventures of Rin Tin Tin

== Places ==
- Fort Apache Historic Park, the former fort and school
- Fort Apache Indian Reservation, Arizona, U.S.
  - Fort Apache, Arizona, an unincorporated community in Navajo County, Arizona, U.S.
- Fuerte Apache, a neighbourhood of Ciudadela near the city of Buenos Aires, Argentina
- "Fort Apache, The Bronx", a former nickname of NYPD's 41st Precinct located in the South Bronx
- Fort Apache playground, and like-named railway station on the Strand miniature Railway, in the Strand leisure Park at Gads Hill, Gillingham, Medway, England ME7 2RW United Kingdom (51.39475, 0.56618)
- Palace of the Public Ministry of the State of Rio Grande do Sul, also known as Fort Apache

== Other uses ==
- Fort Apache (hostile place), a metaphorical term for a place providing shelter from hostile action

== See also ==
- Battle of Fort Apache, 1881
