= Alonzo Cushing =

American Union Army officer (1841–1863)

Alonzo H. Cushing
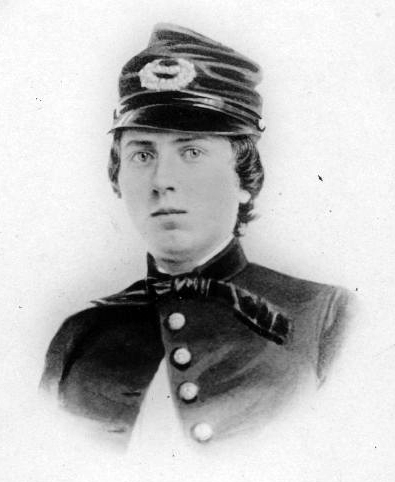
- Cushing, c. 1861
- Born: January 19, 1841; Delafield, Wisconsin, United States
- Died: July 3, 1863 (aged 22); Gettysburg, Pennsylvania, United States
- Burial place: West Point Cemetery, New York, United States
- Relatives: William B. Cushing (brother); Howard B. Cushing (brother)
- Military career
- Allegiance: United States
- Branch: Union Army
- Service years: 1861–1863
- Rank: 1st Lieutenant; Brevet lieutenant colonel
- Commands: 4th U.S. Light Artillery, Battery A
- Conflicts: American Civil War; Battle of Fredericksburg; Battle of Chancellorsville; Battle of Gettysburg; Pickett's Charge †
- Awards: Medal of Honor

Alonzo Hereford Cushing (January 19, 1841 – July 3, 1863) was an artillery officer in the Union Army during the American Civil War. He was killed in action during the Battle of Gettysburg while defending the Union position on Cemetery Ridge against Pickett's Charge. In 2013, 150 years after Cushing's death, he was nominated for the Medal of Honor. The nomination was approved by the United States Congress, and was sent for review by the Defense Department and the President.

On August 26, 2014, the White House announced he would be posthumously awarded the Medal of Honor, with President Barack Obama presiding over the official ceremony on November 6, 2014. Helen Bird Loring Ensign, a first cousin twice removed, accepted the medal on Cushing's behalf, as Cushing left no direct descendants.

== Early life ==
Cushing was born in what is now the city of Delafield, Wisconsin, and raised in Fredonia, New York. His younger brother was future Union Navy officer Cdr. William B. Cushing. They were the youngest of four brothers who eventually served in the Union forces. Their brother Howard was killed during the Indian Wars campaign in 1871.

== Civil War service ==
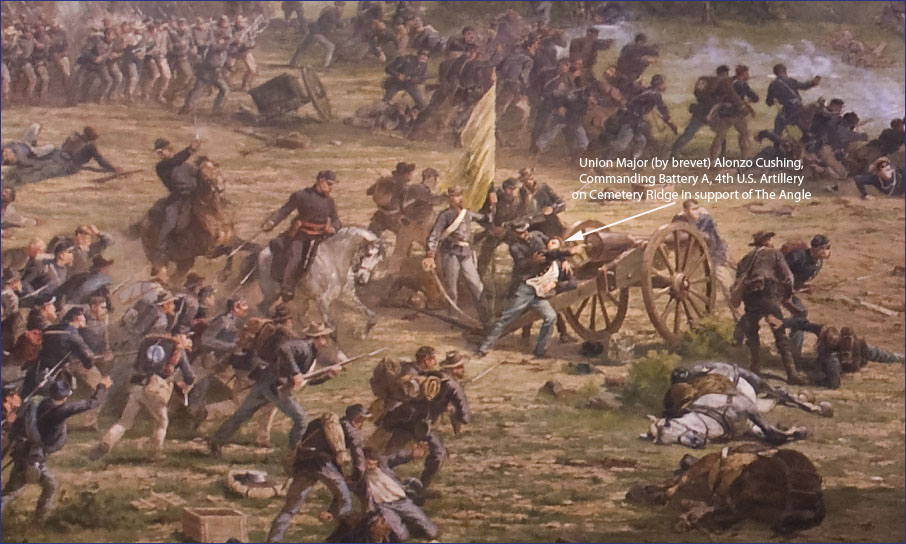
Cushing in the Gettysburg Cyclorama

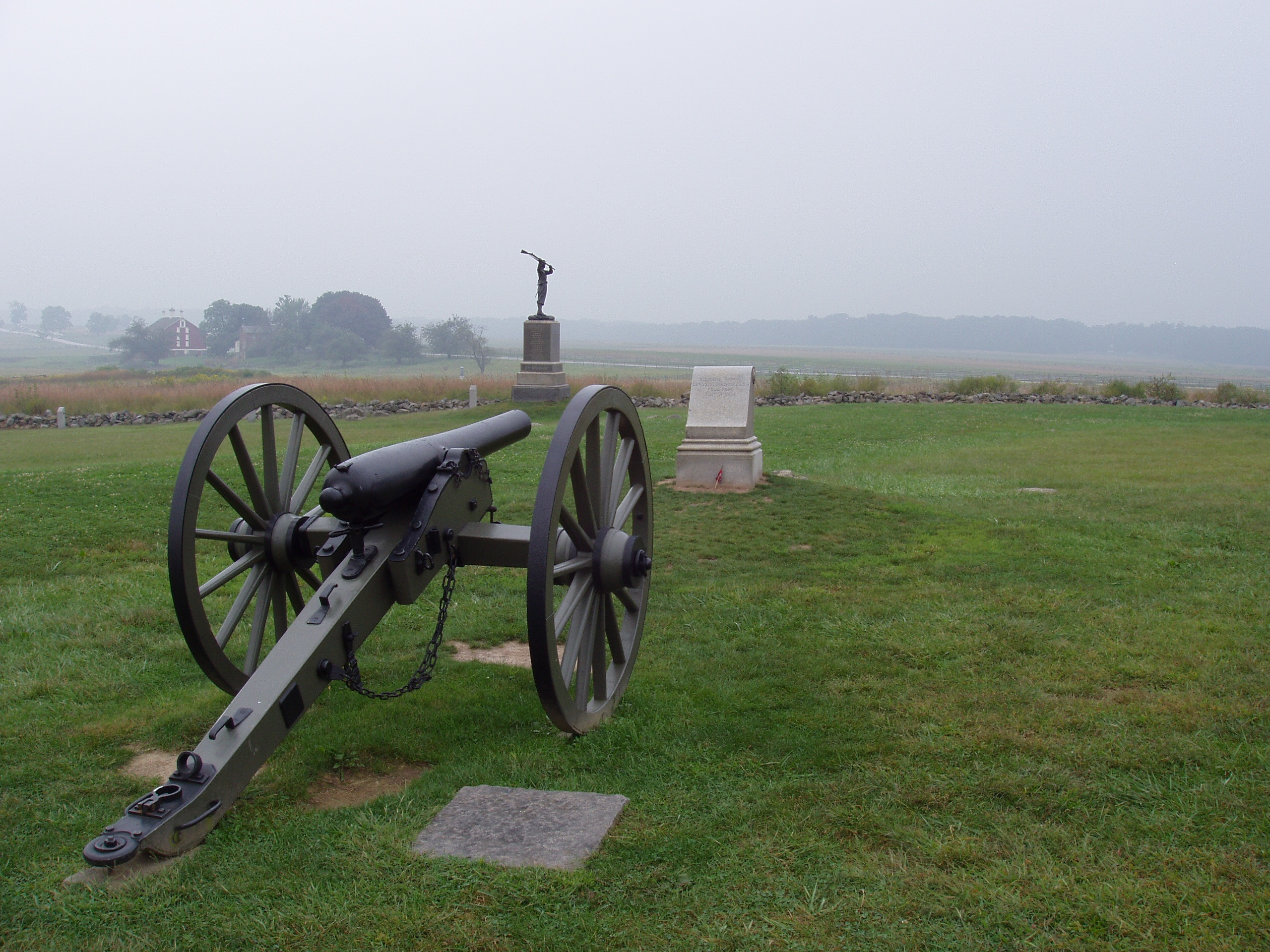
Cushing's battery at Gettysburg

Cushing graduated from the United States Military Academy in West Point, New York, as part of the class of June 1861. He was commissioned as second and first lieutenant on the same day and was brevetted major following the Battle of Chancellorsville.

=== Battle of Gettysburg ===
Cushing commanded Battery A, 4th U.S. Artillery in the Battle of Gettysburg, and was hailed by contemporaries as heroic in his actions on the third day of the battle. He was wounded three times. First, a shell fragment went straight through his shoulder. He was then grievously wounded by a second shell fragment, which tore into his abdomen and groin. This wound exposed his intestines, which he held in place with his hand as he continued to command his battery. After these injuries, a higher-ranking officer said, "Cushing, go to the rear." Cushing, due to the limited number of men left, refused to fall back. The severity of his wounds left him unable to yell his orders above the sounds of battle. Thus, he was held aloft by his 1st Sergeant Frederick Füger, who faithfully passed on Cushing's commands. Füger himself would be awarded the Medal of Honor for his conduct that day.

== Death ==
Cushing was killed at Gettysburg when a bullet entered his mouth and exited through the back of his skull. He died on the field at the height of the Battle of Gettysburg. He was 22 years old.

His body was returned to his family and then interred in West Point Cemetery in Section 26, Row A, Grave 7. At the behest of his mother, Mary, his headstone bears the inscription "Faithful unto Death." His grave is next to that of Major General John Buford, another hero of Gettysburg, who had chosen the battlefield that Cushing had died defending.

== Medal of Honor ==
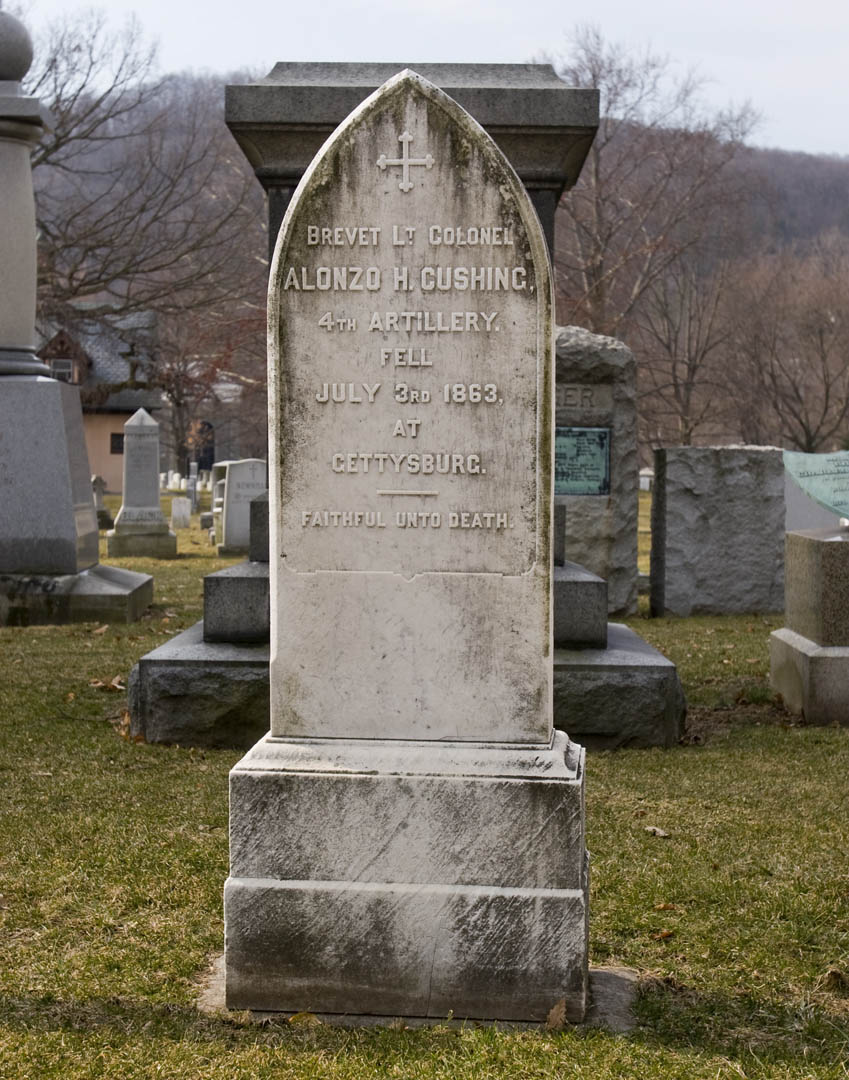
Cushing's headstone at West Point Cemetery

Cushing was nominated for a belated award of the Medal of Honor, beginning with a letter campaign in the late 1980s by a constituent of Senator William Proxmire of Wisconsin. Margaret Zerwekh began her campaign to honor Cushing in 1987 with a letter to Senator Proxmire. She lived on property once owned by Cushing's father in Delafield, Wisconsin and spent years researching his background. For years, she received form letters in return for her letters advocating for Cushing until the early 2000s. The measure was also advocated by Congressman Ron Kind of Wisconsin's 3rd congressional district. In 2002, Senator Russ Feingold (D-WI) nominated Cushing for the Medal of Honor and, following a lengthy investigation, the U.S. Army approved the nomination in February 2010. For the medal to be awarded, it had to be approved by the United States Congress. It was announced on May 20, 2010, that Cushing would receive the Medal of Honor, 147 years after his death.

However, the provision granting Cushing the Medal of Honor was removed from a defense spending bill by Senator Jim Webb (D-VA) in December 2012. In December 2013, the Senate passed a defense bill that included a provision granting Cushing the Medal of Honor. The nomination was sent to the Defense Department for review, before being approved by President Barack Obama. On August 26, 2014, the White House announced Cushing would be posthumously awarded the Medal of Honor. On November 6, 2014, 151 years after Alonzo Cushing's death, President Obama presented the award at a ceremony at the White House, attended by two dozen relatives of the Cushing family.

Cushing was awarded the Medal of Honor by Department of the Army General Order (DAGO) 2014-76 dated December 19, 2014.

=== Medal of Honor Citation ===
The President of the United States of America, authorized by Act of Congress, March 3rd, 1863, has awarded in the name of Congress the Medal of Honor to First Lieutenant Alonzo H. Cushing, United States Army.

First Lieutenant Alonzo H. Cushing distinguished himself by acts of bravery above and beyond the call of duty while serving as an artillery commander in Battery A, 4th U.S. Artillery, Army of the Potomac at Gettysburg, Pennsylvania on July 3rd, 1863 during the American Civil War.

That morning, Confederate forces led by General Robert E. Lee began cannonading First Lieutenant Cushing's position on Cemetery Ridge. Using field glasses, First Lieutenant Cushing directed fire for his own artillery battery. He refused to leave the battlefield after being struck in the shoulder by a shell fragment. As he continued to direct fire, he was struck again – this time suffering grievous damage to his abdomen.

Still refusing to abandon his command, he boldly stood tall in the face of Major General George E. Pickett's charge and continued to direct devastating fire into oncoming forces. As the Confederate forces closed in, First Lieutenant Cushing was struck in the mouth by an enemy bullet and fell dead beside his gun.

His gallant stand and fearless leadership inflicted severe casualties upon Confederate forces and opened wide gaps in their lines, directly impacting the Union force's ability to repel Pickett's charge. First Lieutenant Cushing's extraordinary heroism and selflessness above and beyond the call of duty at the cost of his own life are in keeping with the highest traditions of military service and reflect great credit upon himself, Battery A, 4th U.S. Artillery, Army of the Potomac, and the United States Army.

== Legacy ==
Cushing was posthumously cited for gallantry with a brevet promotion to lieutenant colonel.

Alonzo H. Cushing Camp #5 of the Sons of Union Veterans of the Civil War serves the Ozaukee County region of Wisconsin.

A small state park in Delafield was dedicated to the memory of Cushing and two of his brothers, William and Howard. While the park remains dedicated to the memory of the Cushing brothers, it is now the property of the City of Delafield.

Cushing Elementary School in Delafield (part of the Kettle Moraine School District) is also named after the brothers.

A stone monument in honor of Cushing marks the spot where he was killed during the Battle of Gettysburg. The marker is located on Cemetery Ridge, along Hancock Avenue, at The Angle.

In 2015, the Commandery-in-Chief of the Military Order of the Loyal Legion of the United States (MOLLUS) posthumously elected Lieutenant Cushing as a companion of the Order.

NFL Houston Texans linebacker Brian Cushing is a distant relative of Alonzo Cushing and his brothers.

Cushing is mentioned by name, and his death depicted, in the film Gettysburg.

Stephen Vincent Benét's poem "John Brown's Body" contains a stanza commemorating Cushing's death at Gettysburg:

"Cushing ran down the last of his guns to the battle-line. The rest had been smashed to scrap by Lee's artillery fire. He held his guts in his hand as the charge came up to the wall, And his gun spoke out for him once before he fell to the ground."

== See also ==
- List of Medal of Honor recipients for the Battle of Gettysburg
- List of American Civil War Medal of Honor recipients: A–F
