= Fort Apache (film) =

1948 film by John Ford

- Theatrical release poster
- Directed by: John Ford
- Written by: Frank S. Nugent
- Based on: "Massacre"; 1947 story The Saturday Evening Post by James Warner Bellah
- Produced by: Merian C. Cooper; John Ford
- Starring: John Wayne; Henry Fonda; Shirley Temple; Pedro Armendariz; Ward Bond; George O'Brien; Victor McLaglen; Anna Lee; Irene Rich; Dick Foran; Guy Kibbee; Grant Withers; Mae Marsh; John Agar
- Cinematography: Archie Stout, ASC
- Edited by: Jack Murray
- Music by: Richard Hageman
- Production company: Argosy Pictures
- Distributed by: RKO Radio Pictures
- Release date: March 27, 1948
- Running time: 125 minutes
- Country: United States
- Language: English
- Budget: $2.1 million
- Box office: $3 million (US rentals)

Fort Apache is a 1948 American Western film directed by John Ford and starring John Wayne and Henry Fonda. The film was the first of the director's "Cavalry Trilogy" and was followed by She Wore a Yellow Ribbon (1949) and Rio Grande (1950), both also starring Wayne.

The screenplay was inspired by James Warner Bellah's short story "Massacre" (1947). The historical sources for "Massacre" have been attributed both to George Armstrong Custer's Battle of Little Bighorn and to the Fetterman Fight, with the character of Col. Thursday being very similar in story and appearance to that of Lt. Howard B. Cushing. The film was one of the first to present an authentic and sympathetic view of Native Americans.

In his review of the DVD release of Fort Apache in 2012, The New York Times movie critic Dave Kehr called it "one of the great achievements of classical American cinema, a film of immense complexity that never fails to reveal new shadings with each viewing" and "among the first 'pro-Indian' Westerns" in its portrayal of indigenous Americans with "sympathy and respect".

The film was awarded the Best Director and Best Cinematography awards by the Locarno International Film Festival of Locarno, Switzerland. Screenwriter Frank S. Nugent was nominated for best screenplay by the Writers Guild of America.

== Plot ==
A stagecoach races across the Southwestern desert, carrying widower Lieutenant Colonel Owen Thursday and his daughter, Philadelphia, to his new posting at Fort Apache, an isolated U.S. cavalry post on the Arizona frontier. Thursday is impatient and full of complaints, revealing little understanding of the country. A West Point graduate who was brevetted a general during the Civil War, he has been serving in Europe for several years and is full of resentment at being recalled and “shunted aside” to what he considers a career-ending assignment.

At a waystation, they meet newly minted graduate Second Lieutenant Michael O'Rourke on his way to Fort Apache. Four sergeants arrive with a vehicle to meet Michael, which irks Thursday. The sergeants notice that Michael and Philadelphia are attracted to each other. They arrive at Fort Apache during the Washington's Birthday dance. Philadelphia dances with acting commander Captain Kirby York. York commanded his own regiment during the Civil War and has learned the ways of the Apache. Michael has a touching reunion with his parents.

The next morning at officers call, Thursday assumes command and criticizes them all—except for Michael—for being improperly dressed, revealing a by-the-book approach that soon establishes him as a martinet. When York tries to brief him on the realities of life at Fort Apache, Thursday dismisses Native Americans as “digger Indians”.

Michael is the son of highly regarded Sergeant Major Michael O'Rourke, the post's ranking non-commissioned officer. The elder O'Rourke was a major in the Irish Brigade during the Civil War and earned the Medal of Honor, entitling his son to enter West Point and be commissioned an officer. Thursday is taken aback by this revelation.

Michael takes Philadelphia riding, and they encounter the burned corpses of two men sent to repair the telegraph wires. They race back to Fort Apache. Thursday forbids Michael Philadelphia's company. He sends Michael and a small detail—the sergeants “volunteer”— to retrieve the bodies and repair the wire. York objects until Thursday follows this up with an order to muster a large force to follow on Michael's heels. The trap works and the attacking Native Americans are killed or beaten off.

York advises Thursday to treat the tribes with honor and to remedy problems on the reservation of malnutrition, alcoholism and decay caused by corrupt Indian agent Silas Meacham. An inspection of Meacham's store reveals alcohol, rifles, and shoddy goods. Thursday steps on the scale used to weigh beef rations and observes he has gained a lot of weight. Thursday tells Meacham he would hang him if it were within his power, but duty requires him to protect the man as a representative of the United States government.

At a dinner party with the O’Rourkes, Colonel Thursday interrupts only to be told by Lt O’Rourke that he is in love with Philadelphia. She agrees to be married, but the colonel forbids it.

Cochise has moved into Mexico, fleeing starvation and abuse. Thursday wants to be the man who brings the Apaches back. York successfully negotiates for peace with Cochise, who returns to American soil, but Thursday, eager for a military victory, musters the entire regiment to ride against the Apache.

Outnumbered four to one, Thursday agrees to meet with Cochise, whose allies include Geronimo. Deaf to Cochise's eloquent statement, Thursday promises to attack the next morning. York tells Thursday attacking in columns of fours would be suicidal. Thursday orders York to take Michael and stay back with the supply train. Thursday charges directly into Cochise's trap. Wounded and separated from his men, Thursday refuses a rescue from York and instead returns to die with the remnants of his command. Cochise spares York and the soldiers who did not participate in the battle.

Several years later, Thursday has come to be regarded as a hero. Entertaining some correspondents, Regimental Commander Colonel York says nothing to tarnish the legend. He adds that those who died that day will never be forgotten as long as the regiment lives. He leads the regiment off after Geronimo.

== Cast ==
- John Wayne as Captain Kirby York
- Henry Fonda as Lieutenant Colonel Owen Thursday
- Shirley Temple as Miss Philadelphia Thursday
- Pedro Armendáriz as Sergeant Beaufort
- Ward Bond as Sergeant Major Michael O'Rourke
- George O'Brien as Captain Sam Collingwood
- Victor McLaglen as Sergeant Festus Mulcahy
- Anna Lee as Emily Collingwood
- Irene Rich as Mary O'Rourke
- Dick Foran as Sergeant Quincannon
- Guy Kibbee as First Lieutenant Wilkens, regimental surgeon
- Grant Withers as Silas Meacham
- Jack Pennick as Sergeant Daniel Schattuck
- Ray Hyke as Lieutenant Gates, regimental adjutant
- Movita as Guadalupe, Colonel Thursday's household cook
- Miguel Inclán as Cochise
- Mary Gordon as Ma, the barmaid
- Philip Keiffer as a Trooper
- Mae Marsh as Mrs. Gates
- Hank Worden as Southern recruit
- John Agar as Second Lieutenant Michael Shannon "Mickey" O'Rourke

Unbilled

- Frank McGrath as Corporal Derice
- Fred Graham as a Trooper
- [Uncredited Navajo extra] as Geronimo
- Cliff Clark as Stage Driver
- Francis Ford as Fen (Stage Guard)
- Frank Ferguson as Newspaperman
- William Forrest as Reporter
- Archie R. Twitchell as Reporter
- Harry Tenbrook as Tom O'Feeney
- Mickey Simpson as NCO at dance

== Production ==
=== Filming ===
Some exteriors for the film's location shooting were shot in Monument Valley, Utah. The exteriors involving the fort itself and the renegade Apache agent's trading post were filmed at the Corriganville Movie Ranch, a former Simi Hills movie ranch that is now a regional park in the Simi Valley of Southern California.

=== Cast ===
At the time of filming, Shirley Temple and John Agar were married in real life. Dick Foran sang the 1869 song "Sweet Genevieve" written by Henry Tucker. Pedro Armendariz was a member of Mexico's Golden Age of Movies.

== Reception ==
The film recorded a profit of $445,000 (equivalent to $4,760,000 in 2025). The film is recognized by American Film Institute in its 2008 AFI's 10 Top 10: Nominated Western film.

Bosley Crowther raved about the film in his June 25, 1948 review at The New York Times, observing among heaps of praise: “Folks who are looking for action in the oldest tradition of the screen, observed through a genuine artist's camera, will find plenty of it here. But also apparent in this picture, for those who care to look, is a new and maturing viewpoint upon one aspect of the American Indian wars. For here it is not the "heathen Indian" who is the "heavy" of the piece but a hard-bitten Army colonel, blind through ignorance and a passion for revenge.”

The film has a very rare 100% fresh rating on Rotten Tomatoes, based on 19 reviews.

=== Other rankings ===
Fort Apache is commonly ranked among the most significant films of the "cowboy/western" genre, including:

- "Top-Grossing Westerns from 1930–1972 and Plot Classification" per Wright, W. (1975) in Six guns and society: A structural study of the Western (pp. 30–32). Berkeley, CA: University of California Press.
- #43 in the "Top 100 Westerns": Western Writers of America
- #28 of 92 in "Chronological Listing of Major and Representative Western Films" (Cawelti, 1999)
- #28 in "Chronological Listing of 100 Major and Representative Western Films" (Hausladen, 2003)
- #19 in "Top 100 Western Films (1914–2001)" (Hoffmann, 2003)
- #11 in "AFI's 50 Western Nominees" (American Film Institute)
- #25 in "100 Greatest Western Movies of All-time" (American Cowboy Magazine, 2008)

Additionally, the principal actors were ranked (for this and their other films):

- #6 (Henry Fonda) and #13 (John Wayne) in the "AFI's 50 Greatest American Screen Legends", American Film Institute

== Historicity ==
The story of Fort Apache is, of course, fictional, presenting a kind of "Thursday's Last Stand" as a parallel to the celebrated one involving General Custer in 1876. In 1995, Dee Brown praised Ford's film as "...grounded in reality. Shot in black and white, Fort Apache bears a remarkable resemblance to surviving glass plate photographs of the period and place."

"The first three-quarters of Fort Apache, depicting life on a cavalry post, are well done with skillful recreations of period atmosphere. The two dances staged by Ford deserve an A+, especially the Grand March performed at the non-commissioned officers' ball on the night before Thursday rides out to face the Apaches. The last quarter of the film, however, although exciting to watch, should be viewed as bad mythology. A true portrayal of the Apache wars, it is not."

Brown notes that the real Fort Apache was not so named until five years after the death of Cochise in 1874. While the background of the story as presented bears some relation to reality ("It is true that during the 1870s and 1880s many Indian tribes did leave their reservations because of poor treatment by the government"), no developments resembling the events of the film took place in history. He points out that, given the vast distances involved (from Mexico to Arizona), tribal population numbers (far smaller than at Little Big Horn), and known features of native tactics of the time ("Apaches rarely fought in massed groups") the implausible culminating scenes are little more than "a dramatic series of Frederic Remington images".

== See also ==
- List of American films of 1948
- John Wayne filmography
- Fort Apache (disambiguation)
- Fort Apache, the Bronx (a 1981 crime film, starring Paul Newman)
- Henry Fonda filmography
- Shirley Temple filmography
