= 4th U.S. Artillery, Battery A =

4th U.S. Light Artillery, Battery "A"
- Active: 1861 - 1865
- Country: United States
- Allegiance: Union
- Branch: Field Artillery Branch (United States)
- Engagements: Siege of Yorktown; Battle of Seven Pines; Seven Days Battles; Battle of Savage's Station; Battle of White Oak Swamp; Battle of Malvern Hill; Battle of Antietam; Battle of Fredericksburg; Battle of Chancellorsville; Battle of Gettysburg; Bristoe Campaign; Mine Run Campaign; Battle of the Wilderness; Battle of North Anna; Battle of Totopotomoy Creek; Battle of Cold Harbor

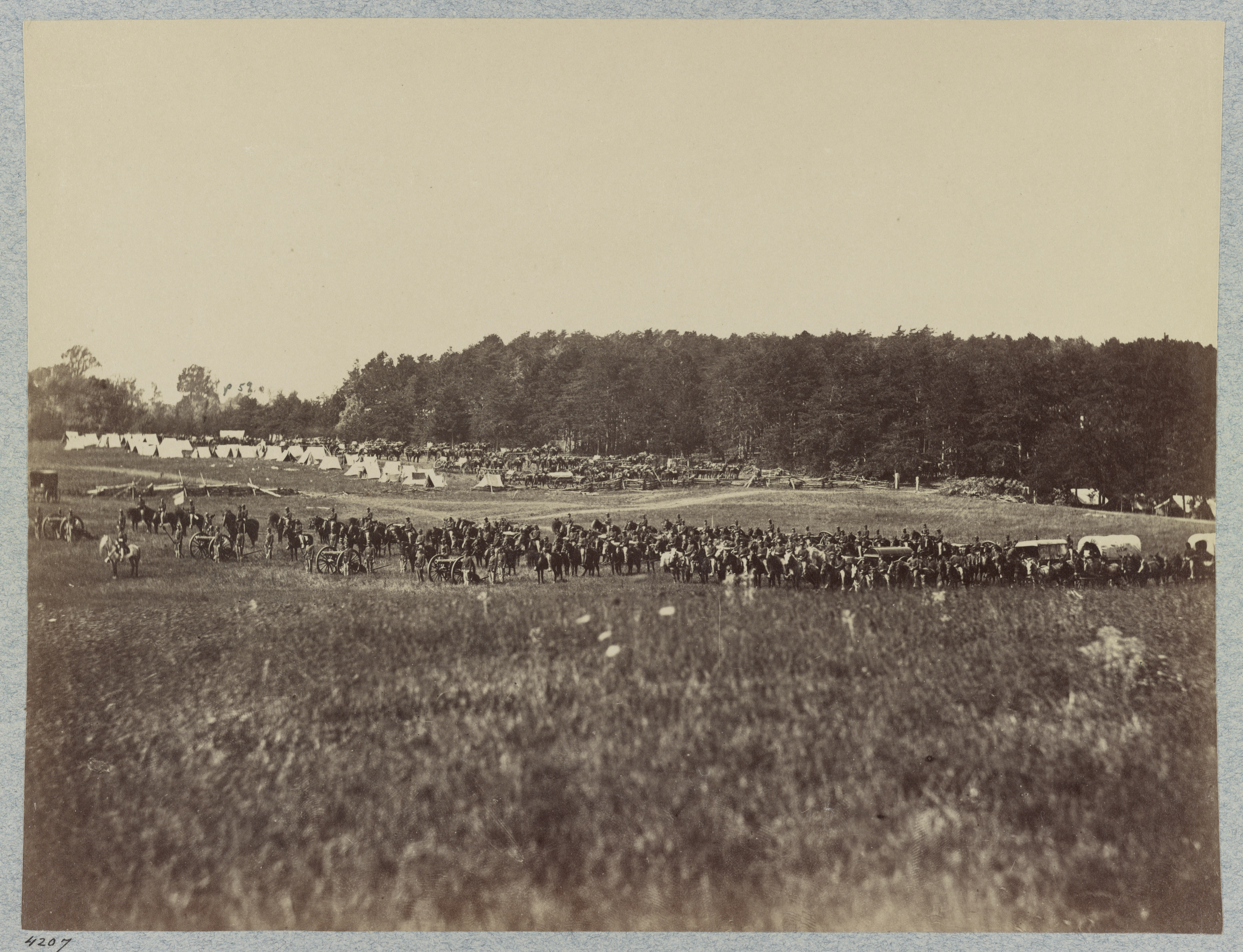
4th U.S. Artillery, Battery A

Battery "A" 4th Regiment of Artillery was a light artillery battery that served in the Union Army during the American Civil War.

== Service ==
- Consolidated with Battery C, 4th U.S. Light Artillery from October 1861 until October 18, 1862.
- Sumner's Division, Army of the Potomac, to March 1862.
- Artillery, 1st Division, II Corps, Army of the Potomac, to November 1862.
- Reserve Artillery, II Corps, to May 1863.
- Artillery Brigade, II Corps, to July 1863.
- 1st Brigade, Horse Artillery, Army of the Potomac, to June 1864.
- 1st Brigade, Hardin's Division, XXII Corps, to July 1864.
- Camp Barry, Defenses of Washington, D.C., XXII Corps, to August 1865.

== Detailed service ==
- Duty in the defenses of Washington, D.C., until March 1862. Moved to the Virginia Peninsula.
- Siege of Yorktown April 5–May 4.
- Battle of Seven Pines, Fair Oaks, May 31–June 1.
- Seven Days Battles before Richmond June 25–July 1.
  - Peach Orchard and Savage Station June 29.
  - White Oak Swamp and Glendale June 30.
  - Malvern Hill July 1.
- At Harrison's Landing until August 16.
- Moved to Alexandria and Centreville August 16–28.
- Covered Pope's retreat August 28–September 2.
- Maryland Campaign September 6–22.
  - Battle of Antietam September 16–17.
- At Harpers Ferry September 22–October 30. Received 70 men who transferred from the 4th Ohio Infantry and refitted at Washington, D.C. before rejoining II Corps.
- Movement to Falmouth, Va., October 30–November 19.
- Battle of Fredericksburg December 12–15.
- At Falmouth, Va., until April 1863.
- Chancellorsville Campaign April 27–May 6.
  - Battle of Chancellorsville May 1–5.
- Gettysburg Campaign June 11-July 16.
  - Battle of Gettysburg July 1–3.
- Made a horse battery July 15, and attached to 1st Division, Cavalry Corps, Army of the Potomac.
- Advanced to the Rapidan September 13–17.
  - Culpeper Court House September 13.
- Reconnaissance across the Rapidan September 21–23.
- Bristoe Campaign October 9–22.
  - White Sulphur Springs October 12.
  - Bristoe Station October 14.
  - St. Stephen's Church October 14.
- Advance to line of the Rappahannock November 7–8.
- Mine Run Campaign November 26–December 2.
  - Parker's Store November 29.
- Rapidan Campaign May 4–June 4, 1864.
  - Battle of the Wilderness May 5–7.
  - Sheridan's Raid to the James River May 9–24.
  - North Anna River May 9.
  - Ground Squirrel Church and Yellow Tavern May 11.
  - Brook Church, Fortifications of Richmond, May 12.
- On line of the Pamunkey May 26–28.
- Totopotomoy May 28–31.
- Cold Harbor May 31–June 1.
- Dismounted and sent to Washington, D.C., June 4.
- Duty in the defenses of Washington, D.C., until August 1865.

== Commanders ==
- Captain George Washington Hazzard - mortally wounded at the Battle of White Oak Swamp
- Brevet Captain Rufus King, Jr. - commanded at the Battle of White Oak Swamp while still at the rank of 1st lieutenant after Cpt Hazzard was mortally wounded
- Lieutenant Alonzo H. Cushing- commanded at the Battle of Gettysburg; killed in action
- 1st Lieutenant Evan Thomas
- 1st Lieutenant Horatio B. Reed
- 2nd Lieutenant Samuel Canby - commanded at the Battle of Gettysburg after Lt Cushing was wounded and until he was wounded in action
- 2nd Lieutenant Joseph S. Milne - commanded at the Battle of Gettysburg after Lt Canby was wounded and until he was wounded in action
- 1st Sergeant Frederick Füger - commanded at the Battle of Gettysburg after all officers were killed or wounded in action

== Notable members ==
- Lieutenant Alonzo Cushing - Medal of Honor recipient for action at the Battle of Gettysburg
- 1st Sergeant Frederick W. Füger - Medal of Honor recipient for action at the Battle of Gettysburg
- Captain Rufus King Jr. - Medal of Honor recipient for action at the Battle of White Oak Swamp

== See also ==
- List of United States Regular Army Civil War units
- 4th Air Defense Artillery Regiment
