= Henry Fonda filmography =

Henry Fonda and daughter Jane Fonda in 1943

This is the filmography of American actor Henry Fonda (May 16, 1905 – August 12, 1982). From the beginning of Fonda's career in 1935 through to his last projects in 1981, Fonda appeared in more than 100 films, television programs and short subjects.

Through the course of his career, he appeared in many critically acclaimed films, including 12 Angry Men and The Ox-Bow Incident. His roles in 1940's The Grapes of Wrath and 1981's On Golden Pond both earned him Academy Award nominations and he won for the latter. Fonda made his mark in Westerns, appearing as Frank James in Jesse James and The Return of Frank James, and war films such as The Longest Day and In Harm's Way, and made frequent appearances in both television and foreign productions late in his career. He was Bette Davis' leading man in the romantic period piece Jezebel and portrayed historical figures Abraham Lincoln in Young Mr. Lincoln and Wyatt Earp in My Darling Clementine. Fonda made three movies with his close friend James Stewart: On Our Merry Way, Firecreek and The Cheyenne Social Club; the two appearing separately as well in How the West Was Won. Henry Fonda made no major film appearances between 1948's Fort Apache with John Wayne and Mister Roberts with James Cagney in 1955, seven years later, concentrating instead on the stage; both films were directed by John Ford.

== Filmography ==
=== Feature films ===
Year	Film	Role	Notes
1935	The Farmer Takes a Wife	Dan Harrow	
1935	Way Down East	David Bartlett	
1935	I Dream Too Much	Jonathan "Johnny" Street	
1936	The Trail of the Lonesome Pine	Dave Tolliver	
1936	The Moon's Our Home	Anthony Amberton / John Smith	
1936	Spendthrift	Townsend Middleton	
1937	Wings of the Morning	Kerry Gilfallen	
1937	You Only Live Once	Eddie Taylor	
1937	Slim	Slim Kincaid	
1937	That Certain Woman	Jack V. Merrick Jr.	
1938	I Met My Love Again	Ives Towner	
1938	Jezebel	Preston Dillard	
1938	Blockade	Marco	
1938	Spawn of the North	Jim Kimmerlee	
1938	The Mad Miss Manton	Peter Ames	
1939	Jesse James	Frank James	
1939	Let Us Live	Brick Tennant	
1939	The Story of Alexander Graham Bell	Thomas Watson	
1939	Young Mr. Lincoln	Abraham Lincoln	
1939	Drums Along the Mohawk	Gilbert Martin	
1940	The Grapes of Wrath	Tom Joad	
1940	Lillian Russell	Alexander Moore	
1940	The Return of Frank James	Frank James	
1940	Chad Hanna	Chad Hanna	
1941	The Lady Eve	Charles Pike	
1941	Wild Geese Calling	John Murdock	
1941	You Belong to Me	Peter Kirk	Alternate title: Good Morning, Doctor
1942	The Male Animal	Prof. Tommy Turner	
1942	Rings on Her Fingers	John Wheeler	
1942	The Magnificent Dope	Thadeus Winship Page	Alternate titles: Lazy Galahad, The Magnificent Jerk
1942	Tales of Manhattan	George	
1942	The Big Street	Augustus "Little Pinks" Pinkerton II	
1943	Immortal Sergeant	Cpl. Colin Spence	
1943	The Ox-Bow Incident	Gil Carter	
1946	My Darling Clementine	Town Marshal Wyatt Earp	
1947	The Long Night	Joe Adams	
1947	The Fugitive	Fugitive Priest	
1947	Daisy Kenyon	Peter Lapham	
1948	On Our Merry Way	Lank Solsky	
1948	Fort Apache	Lt. Col. Owen Thursday	
1949	Jigsaw	Nightclub Waiter	Uncredited cameo
1955	Mister Roberts	Lt. Douglas A. Roberts	
1956	War and Peace	Count Pierre Bezukhov	
1956	The Wrong Man	Manny Balestrero	
1957	12 Angry Men	Davis, Juror #8	Also producer
1957	The Tin Star	Morgan Hickman	
1958	Stage Struck	Lewis Easton	
1959	Warlock	Clay Blaisedell	
1959	The Man Who Understood Women	Willie Bauche	
1962	Advise & Consent	Robert A. Leffingwell	
1962	The Longest Day	Brig. Gen. Theodore Roosevelt Jr.	
1962	How the West Was Won	Jethro Stuart	
1963	Spencer's Mountain	Clay Spencer	
1964	The Best Man	Sen. William Russell	
1964	Fail Safe	The President	
1964	Sex and the Single Girl	Frank Broderick	
1965	The Rounders	Marion 'Howdy' Lewis	
1965	In Harm's Way	Adm. Chester W. Nimitz	
1965	The Dirty Game	Dimitri Koulov	Alternate title: The Secret Agents
1965	Battle of the Bulge	Lt. Col. Daniel Kiley	
1966	A Big Hand for the Little Lady	Meredith / Ben Bailey	Alternate title: Big Deal at Dodge City
1967	Welcome to Hard Times	Mayor Will Blue	
1968	Firecreek	Bob Larkin	
1968	Madigan	Commissioner Anthony X. Russell	
1968	Yours, Mine and Ours	Frank Beardsley	
1968	The Boston Strangler	John S. Bottomly	
1968	Once Upon a Time in the West	Frank	
1970	Too Late the Hero	Capt. John G. Nolan	
1970	The Cheyenne Social Club	Harley Sullivan	
1970	There Was a Crooked Man...	Sheriff Woodward Lopeman	
1971	Sometimes a Great Notion	Henry Stamper	Alternate title: Never Give A Inch
1973	Night Flight from Moscow	Allan Davies	Alternate title: The Serpent
1973	Ash Wednesday	Mark Sawyer	
1973	My Name Is Nobody	Jack Beauregard	
1974	Last Days of Mussolini	Cardinal Alfredo Ildefonso Schuster	Alternate title: The Last 4 Days
1976	Midway	Adm. Chester W. Nimitz	Alternate title: Battle of Midway
1977	Tentacles	Mr. Whitehead	
1977	The Great Smokey Roadblock	Elegant John Howard	Alternate titles: The Goodbye Run, The Last of the Cowboys
1977	Rollercoaster	Simon Davenport	
1978	The Greatest Battle	Brig. Gen. Harold Foster	Alternate titles: The Biggest Battle, Battle Force
1978	Fedora	President of the Academy	Cameo
1978	The Swarm	Dr. Walter Krim	
1979	City on Fire	Chief Albert Risley	
1979	Wanda Nevada	Old Prospector	Cameo
1979	Meteor	The President	
1981	On Golden Pond	Norman Thayer Jr.	Final film performance, won Academy Award for Best Actor

=== Television ===
Year	Film	Role	Notes
1953	Medallion Theatre	Dr. Martin Arrowsmith	TV series (Episode: "The Decision of Arrowsmith")
1955	General Electric Theater	Emmett Kelly	TV series (Episode: "Clown")
1955	Producers' Showcase	Alan Squier	TV series (Episode: "The Petrified Forest")
1959–1961	The Deputy	Chief Marshal Simon Fry	TV series (76 episodes)
1963	The Dick Powell Show	Dr. Victor Fallon	TV series (Episode: "Tissue of Hate")
1967	Stranger on the Run	Ben Chamberlain	TV movie
1970	The Bill Cosby Show	Joshua Richards	TV series (Episode: "The Elevator Doesn't Stop Here Anymore")
1971	The Doris Day Show	Henry Fonda	TV series (Episode: "Doris Goes to Hollywood")
1971–1972	The Smith Family	Chad Smith	TV series (39 episodes)
1973	The Red Pony	Carl Tiflin	TV movie
1973	The Alpha Caper	Mark Forbes	TV movie
1974	Clarence Darrow	Clarence Darrow	TV movie
1974	All in the Family	Host / Narrator	TV series (Episode: "The Best of All in the Family")
1976	Collision Course: Truman vs. MacArthur	Gen. Douglas MacArthur	TV movie
1976	Maude	Henry Fonda	TV series (Episode: "Maude's Mood (Part 1 & 2)")
1976	Captains and the Kings	Sen. Enfield Bassett	TV miniseries (2 episodes)
1978	Home to Stay	Grandpa George	TV movie
1979	Roots: The Next Generations	Colonel Frederick Warner	TV miniseries (3 episodes)
1979	Family	James Lawrence	TV series (Episode: "Thanksgiving")
1980	The Oldest Living Graduate	Colonel J.C. Kincaid	TV movie
1980	Gideon's Trumpet	Clarence Earl Gideon	TV movie
1981	Summer Solstice	Joshua Turner	TV movie (final television performance)
