= High-water mark of the Confederacy =

Area in Cemetery Ridge, Gettysburg

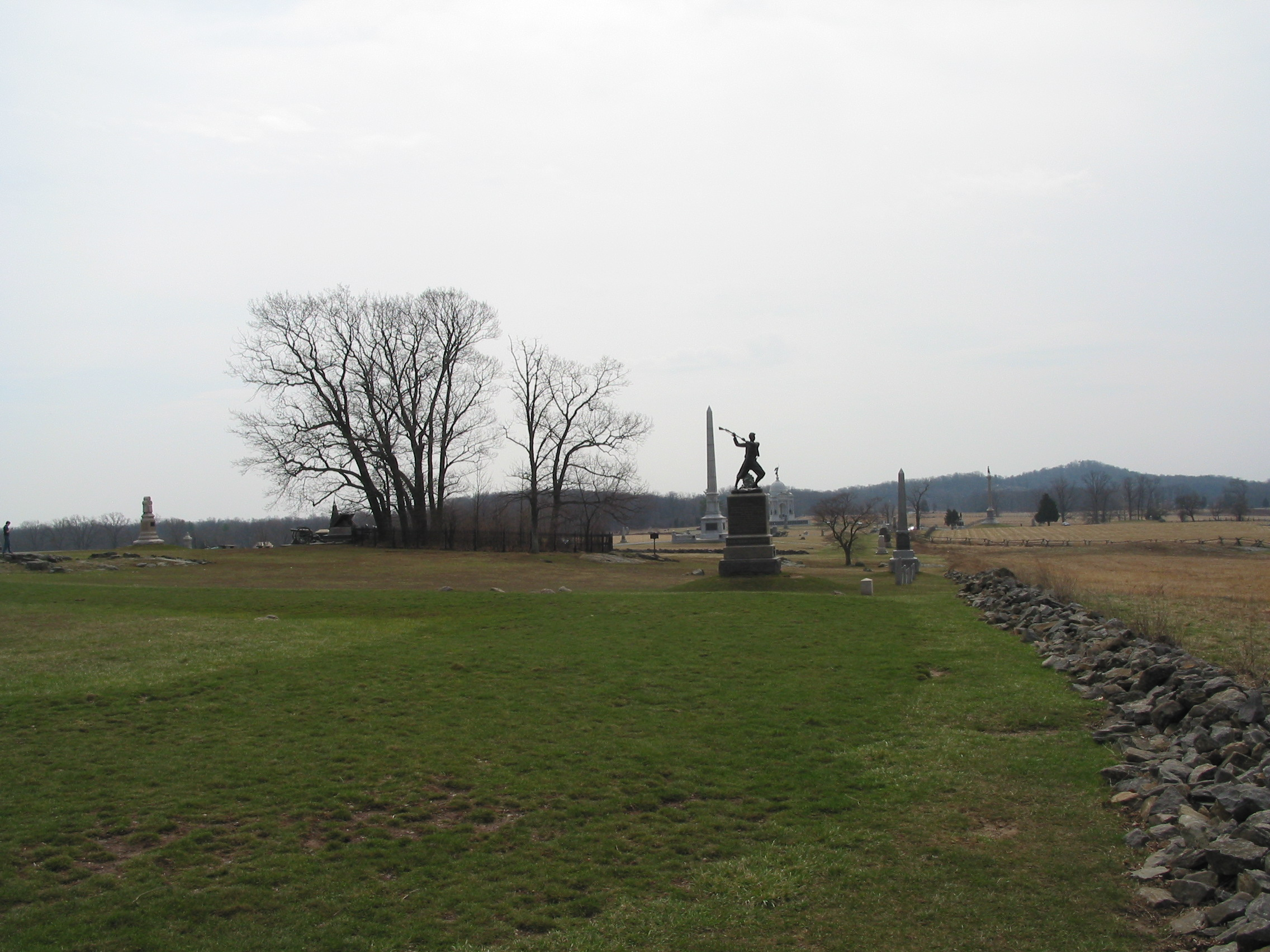
- To the left (east) of The Angle stone wall was the furthest advances of the units of Longstreet's assault during the 1863 Battle of Gettysburg.
- Interactive map of High-water mark of the Confederacy
- 39°48′45″N 77°14′09″W
- Location: Cemetery Ridge, Gettysburg National Military Park

History
- Establishing event: Pickett's Charge, July 3, 1863

The high-water mark of the Confederacy or high tide of the Confederacy refers to an area on Cemetery Ridge near Gettysburg, Pennsylvania, marking the furthest point reached by Confederate forces during Pickett's Charge on July 3, 1863. Similar to a high water mark, the term is a reference to arguably the Confederate Army's best chance of victory during the war. The line of advance was east of "The Angle" stone wall.

== History ==
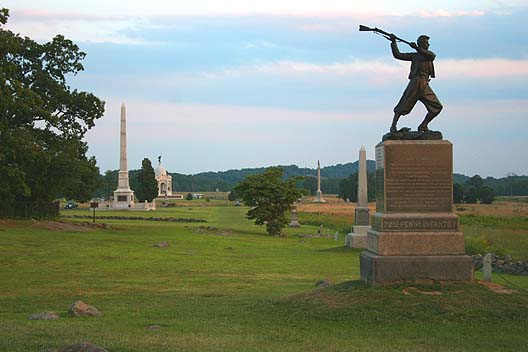
The 72nd Pennsylvania Infantry Monument marks their "advance position".

This designation was invented by government historian John B. Bachelder after the war when the monuments of the Gettysburg Battlefield were being constructed. Some historians have argued that the battle was the turning point of the war and this was the place which represented the Confederacy's last major offensive operation in the Eastern Theater.

On the third day of the battle (July 3, 1863), General Robert E. Lee of the Confederate States Army ordered an attack on the Union Army center, located on Cemetery Ridge. This offensive maneuver called for almost 12,500 men to march over 1,000 yards (900 m) of dangerously open terrain.

Preceded by a massive but mostly ineffective Confederate artillery barrage, the march across open fields toward the Union lines became known as Pickett's Charge; Maj. Gen. George Pickett was one of three division commanders under the command of Lt. Gen. James Longstreet, but his name has been popularly associated with the assault. Union guns and infantry on Cemetery Ridge opened fire on the advancing men, inflicting a 50% casualty rate on the Confederate ranks. One of Pickett's brigade commanders was Brig. Gen. Lewis Armistead. His men were able to breach the Union lines in just one place, a bend in the wall that has become known as "the Angle". This gap in the Union line was hastily closed, with any Confederate soldiers who had breached it being quickly captured or killed, including Armistead.

Lee's Army of Northern Virginia retreated the next day, leaving Gettysburg for Virginia. Even though the war lasted almost another two years, Lee launched few offensive operations during that time, none of them near the scale of the Gettysburg campaign.

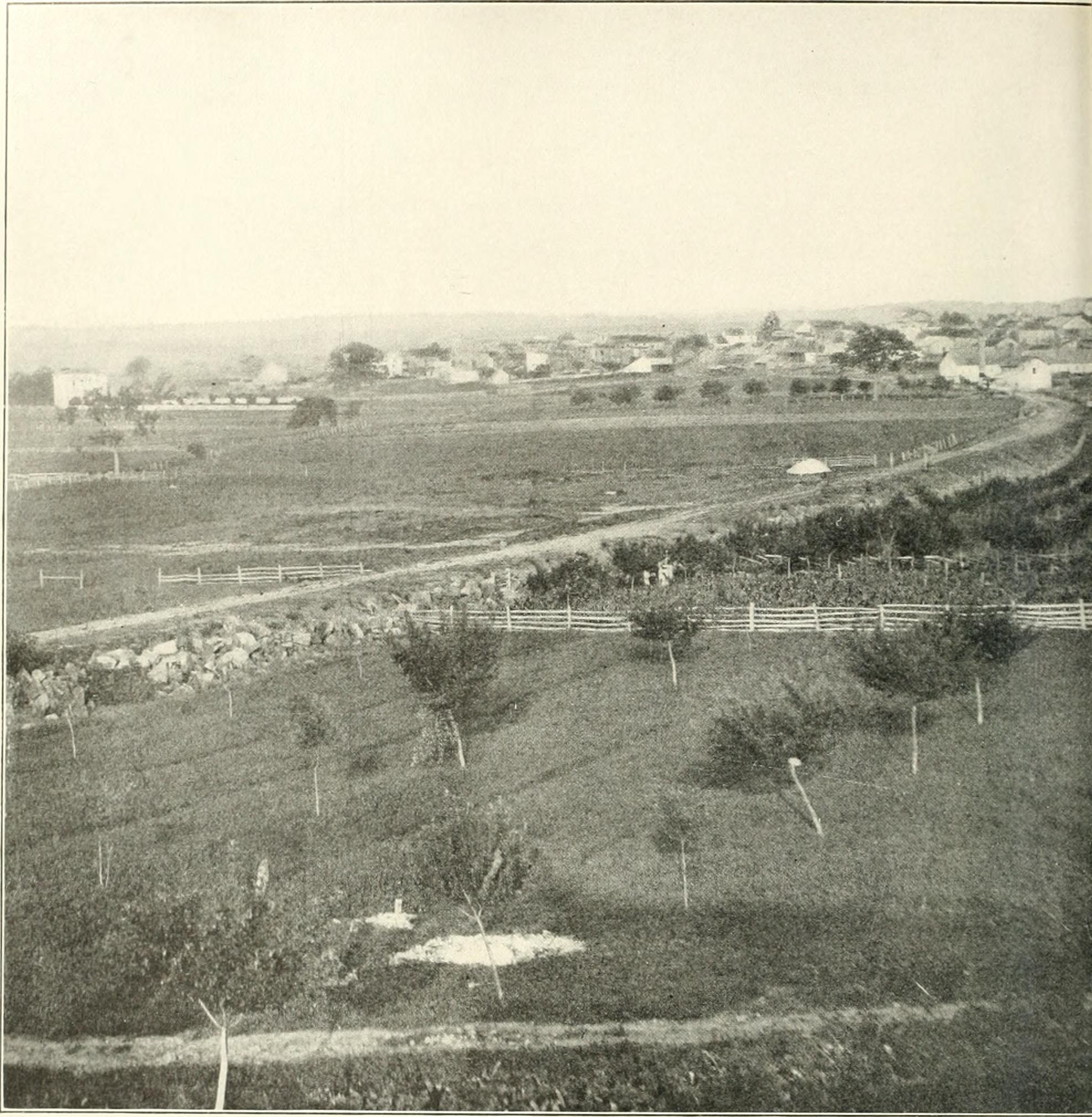
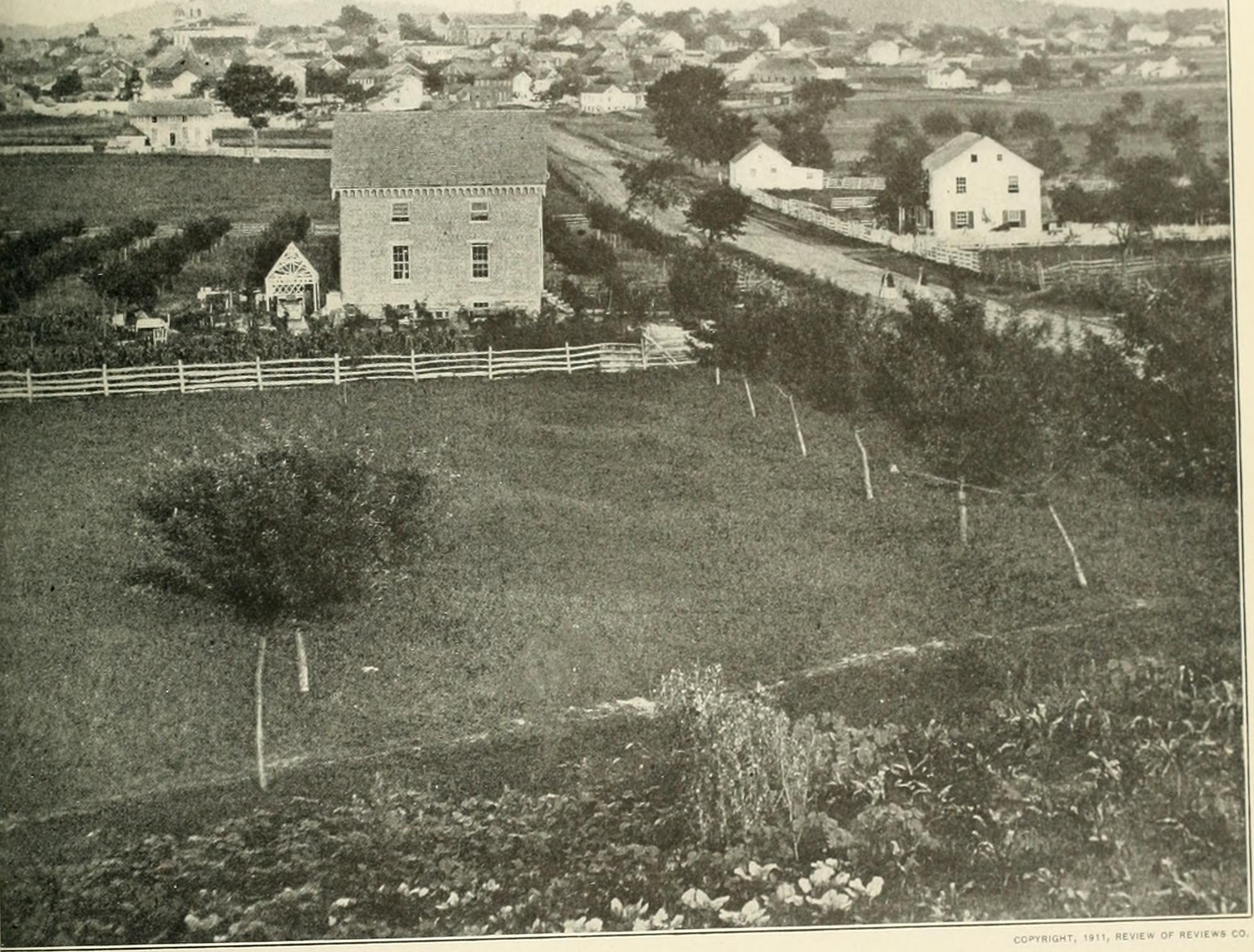
Panorama of the High-Water Mark from The Photographic History of the Civil War: In the center of the panorama rises Cemetery Ridge, where the defeated 1st and 11th Federal Corps slept on their arms on the night of July 1, after having been driven back through the town by the numerically superior forces of Hill and Ewell. The lower eminence to the right of it is Culp's Hill. At the extreme right of the picture stands Round Top.

== Monuments ==
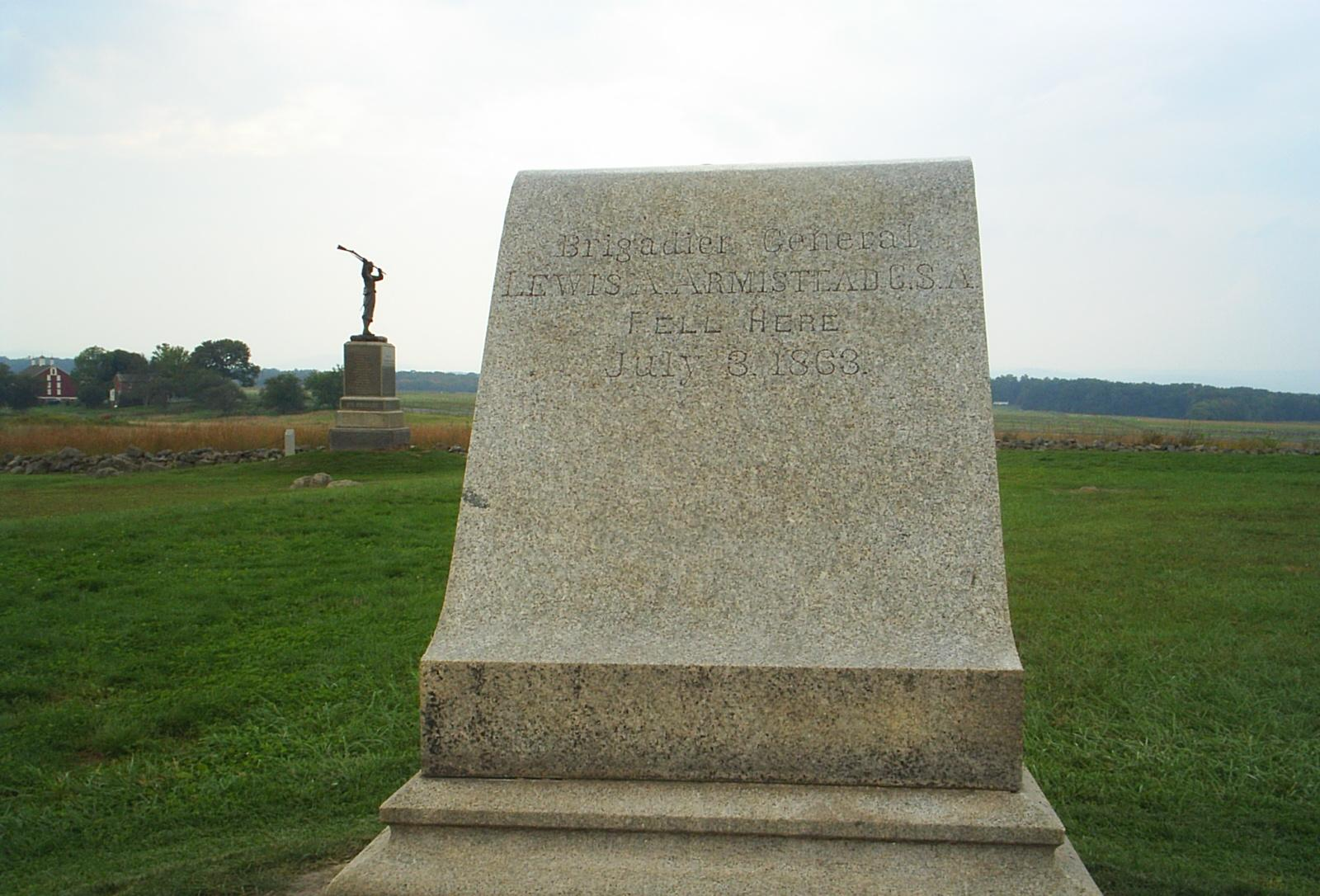
The Armistead Marker marks where General Armistead collapsed with mortal wounds.

Some of the monuments at the high-water mark include:

- The High Water Mark of the Rebellion Monument is a bronze tablet marking the turning point of Pickett's Charge.
- The 72nd Pennsylvania Infantry Monument (1891) is a statuary monument denoting where Union forces (including the 72nd Pennsylvania Infantry) beat back Confederate forces engaged in Pickett's Charge.
- The Alonzo Cushing Marker shows the "spot where Lt. Alonzo Cushing was mortally wounded".
- The 1887 Lewis A. Armistead Marker marks the spot where Confederate General Lewis Armistead placed his hand on a Union cannon before collapsing with mortal wounds. Armistead was one of 1,500 Confederate Virginians that broke through the Union line at The Angle.
- The New York 1st Independent Artillery Memorial commemorates the Cowan Battery which fired on Pickett's Charge and had a cannon temporarily captured by Armistead's troops.

== See also ==
- Turning point of the American Civil War
