= Gettysburg Battlefield Memorial Association =

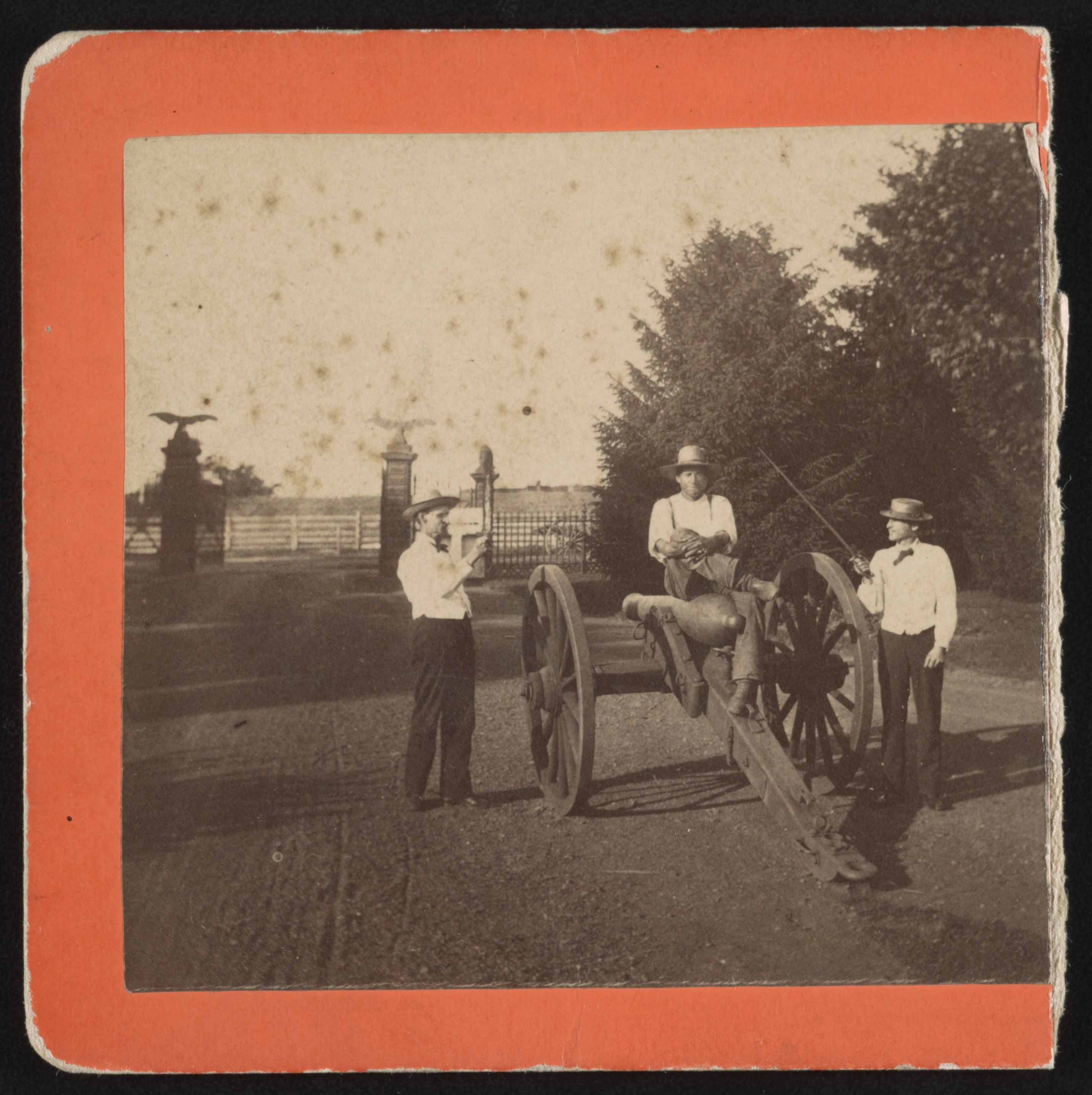
Gettysburg Battlefield Memorial Association Superintendent Nicholas G. Wilson and others with Civil War cannon at the Gettysburg Battlefield. From the Liljenquist Family Collection of Civil War Photographs, Prints and Photographs division, Library of Congress

The Gettysburg Battlefield Memorial Association (GBMA) was a historic preservation membership organization and is the eponym for the battlefield's memorial association era. The association was chartered by the Commonwealth of Pennsylvania on April 13, 1864, after attorney David McConaughy recommended on August 14, 1863, a preservation association to sell membership stock for battlefield fundraising. McConaughy transferred his land acquired in 1863 to the GBMA, and the association's board members were initially local officials. The GBMA sold stock to raise money, hired a superintendent at $1000/yr, added to McConaughy's land holdings, and operated a wooden observation tower on East Cemetery Hill from 1878–95.

The association granted few exceptions to their requirement for placing memorials only on established lines, e.g., the 1887 plaque commemorating Gen Armistead's farthest advance on July 3 and the 1884 2nd Maryland monument on Culp's Hill. In 1880, GBMA officers were Grand Army of the Republic members from various states, by late 1882 GBMA funds were nearly exhausted, and by the 1890s the GBMA's roads were in disrepair.

== "72nd Penn'a Regiment Case" ==
After being chartered by the commonwealth, the GBMA subsequently claimed to have the exclusive zoning authority to locate all Gettysburg monuments including those not on the small portion of battlefield land owned by the GBMA. In July 1888 the GBMA denied the 72nd Pennsylvania Infantry's request to place a statuary monument on the 72nd's private land at The Angle, a location previously approved by a commonwealth commission of five state officers. The GBMA then had the 72nd's Captain John Reed arrested on December 12, 1888, for trespassing after "he had started men at work laying a foundation for the [statuary] monument of the Seventy-second Regiment." In October 1889, Gettysburg Battlefield Memorial Association v. Seventy-second Pennsylvania Regiment heard testimony regarding the regiment's Pickett's Charge location(s), and the Supreme Court of Pennsylvania "reaffirmed" for the 72nd: "the Commonwealth … has the right to designate the position where any of her regiments specially distinguished themselves" (Justice Sterrett). Although at the July 4, 1891, statuary dedication Edward McPherson accepted the monument for the GBMA, on August 25, the GBMA Executive Committee recommended a disclaimer marker be placed to indicate the GBMA had "no responsibility for the location of the monument as now placed".

In 1888, the association had trees planted in Zeigler's Grove, and in 1889 and 1890, the GBMA disapproved John B. Bachelder's idea for the 1892 High Water Mark of the Rebellion Monument before unanimously approving it in 1891.

== Trolley case ==
After granting the 1884 Round Top Branch steamtrain railroad right-of-way over the battlefield, the GBMA denied right-of-way on battlefield roads to the Gettysburg Electric Railway in August 1891. The trolley line instead acquired right-of-way on Cumberland Twp roads, and the GBMA lost a Pennsylvania claim to stop construction when the commonwealth Attorney General ruled in August 1893: "the right of owners of private property…cannot be disputed. …the line itself…has been chosen with a view of affording tourists the best possible means of visiting and viewing this great battlefield and doing the least possible injury to its natural conditions".

The federal Gettysburg Park Commission (GPC) was established by the United States Department of War on March 3, 1893, for "ascertaining the extent of…the trolley", and former GBMA Superintendent of Tablets and Legends (1883–7), John B. Bachelder, was 1 of the 3 federal commissioners. Federal acquisition of GBMA land that would become the 1895 Gettysburg National Military Park began on June 7, 1893, with 9 monument tracts of 25 ft × 25 ft (7.6 m × 7.6 m) each and a larger 10th lot of 1.2 acres (0.49 ha) from the GBMA, and on June 16, 1893, Bachelder submitted a complaint to the Secretary of War about railbed construction on private land. As recommended by the 72nd PA Infantry committee in 1893 ("set aside spots right in the route of the trolley"); the GBMA filed an April 7, 1894, federal Bill in Equity to block trolley use over Hancock Avenue at the steamtrain crossing. After the GBMA's bill and one by the federal Attorney General were dismissed on June 20, 1894, federal legislation was passed to allow payment of the GBMA debts of $1960.46 for the War Department to acquire 124 GBMA tracts totalling 522 acres (211 ha) on February 4, 1896.

== End of the era ==
In 1894, a committee was appointed to inquire into the feasibility of transferring the remaining GBMA property to the US government, and the GBMA's last meeting was May 22, 1895. After the GBMA had expended over $680,000, the 320 monuments and ~17 miles (27 km) of roads at the end of the memorial association era were substantially increased during the 1895-1927 Gettysburg Battlefield commemorative era.

The monument memorializing the GBMA's efforts was completed in 1908, the GBMA treasurer record was found in the Methodist Church archives in 1941, and in 1982, the 1872–1895 minutes of the GBMA Board of Directors were transcribed (computerized in 1997).
