= 72nd Pennsylvania Infantry Monument =

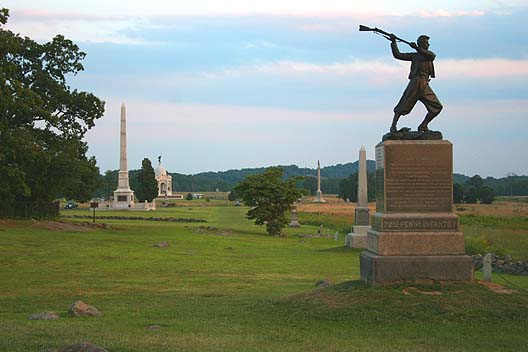
- The monument (foreground) in 2005; Little Round Top and Big Round Top are in the distant background.
- Interactive map of 72nd Pennsylvania Infantry Monument
- Location: Gettysburg National Military Park, Pennsylvania
- Coordinates: 39°48′46.8″N 77°14′10.6″W
- Dedicated date: July 4, 1891

The 72nd Pennsylvania Infantry Monument is an 1891 statuary memorial on the Gettysburg Battlefield. It is located on Cemetery Ridge, by The Angle and the copse of trees, where Union forces – including the 72nd Pennsylvania Infantry – beat back Confederate forces engaged in Pickett's Charge.

The monument was the subject of a Pennsylvania Supreme Court case over control of the battlefield. It is depicted on the 2011 "Gettysburg" America the Beautiful quarter commemorative coin.

The regiment erected an earlier monument in 1883. To avoid confusion, that is now usually referred to as the "Philadelphia Brigade" Monument.

== History ==
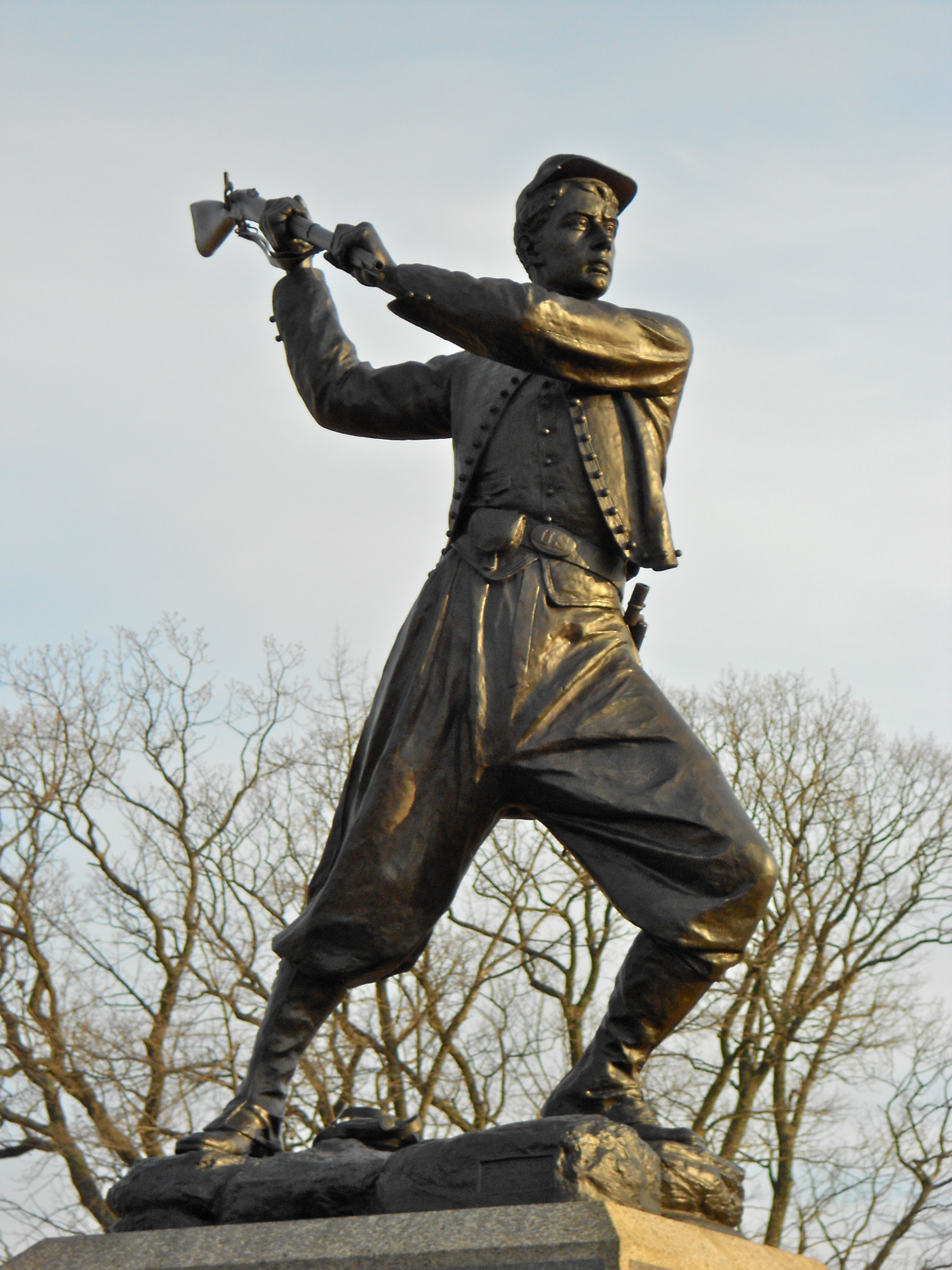
Fire Zouave (1891), Stephens, sculptor.

The 72nd Pennsylvania Infantry Regiment, commanded by Colonel DeWitt Clinton Baxter and also called "Baxter's Philadelphia Fire Zouaves," was recruited among firemen in Philadelphia, Pennsylvania. Their dress uniforms were modeled on those of the Zouaves, a North African Berber tribe famous for its ferocious fighting.

The 72nd played an important role in beating back Pickett's Charge on July 3, 1863. At the beginning of the Confederate advance across the valley, the 72nd was posted in support and to the rear of the batteries upon Hancock's front. "As the enemy drove in the brigade pickets from the Emmitsburg Road, [sic] the regiment was rushed to the front line, striking the assailants at the famous stone wall and the clump of trees." That morning, the Fire Zouaves had numbered 458 officers and men; after the engagement's fury, there were 266 of the 72nd left for further duty.

=== First monument ===
In 1864, Pennsylvania granted a charter to the Gettysburg Battlefield Memorial Association for promoting and protecting "memorial structures." The GBMA subsequently asserted that it had exclusive authority to approve the design and location of all Gettysburg monuments, including on battlefield land not owned by the GBMA. In 1896, the GBMA's land holdings totalled 522 acres (0.816 sq mi); Gettysburg National Military Park now totals 3,965 acres (6.195 sq mi).

In 1883, the first "72nd PA Infty" monument was approved, and the GBMA placed it on the "Roberts Line ... where their heavy losses were". This location seems to have been a "safe" choice by the GBMA, since there remained nagging questions about when – early or late in the battle – the 72nd had joined in the worst of the fighting.

=== Pennsylvania Supreme Court ===
Members of the regiment vehemently disagreed with the placement of the monument. The GBMA-chosen location was nearly 70 yd (64 m) behind the Union front line, instead of right at it. Much of the battlefield land was still in private hands, and the 72nd bought a 900 sq ft (84 m^{2}) tract at the Union front line, on which to erect a second monument. Significantly, the regiment also bypassed the GBMA, obtaining approval for the second monument from a different Pennsylvania commission.

In July 1888, the GBMA denied permission for the 72nd to build the second monument – on its own land. On December 12, 1888, the GBMA had the 72nd's Captain John Reed arrested for trespassing, after "he had started men at work laying a foundation for the [second] monument of the Seventy-second Regiment". The unit's 1889 history, The Seventy-second Regiment, Pennsylvania Volunteers, at Bloody Angle, published the unit's actions on July 3 of the Battle of Gettysburg.

=== Gettysburg Battlefield Memorial Association v. Seventy-second Pennsylvania Regiment ===
In October 1889, Gettysburg Battlefield Memorial Association v. Seventy-second Pennsylvania Regiment heard testimony regarding the regiment's Pickett's Charge location(s). The Pennsylvania Supreme Court subsequently "reaffirmed" for the 72nd, finding that the authority of the state commission established by a state act superseded any GBMA organizational authority for monument locations (e.g., for US regulars and other states' units): "the Commonwealth ... has the right to designate the position where any of her regiments specially distinguished themselves" (Justice Sterrett).

Gettysburg's local newspaper, The Star and Sentinel, editorialized that the Commonwealth was "in the position of a cheat," for ruling that Pennsylvania units were not required to follow GBMA decisions, as other states' units were.

=== Second monument ===
The approximately-13.5 ft (4.1 m) monument consists of a two-part, stepped, polished-granite shaft set on a two-part, rough- and finish-cut stepped base, and topped by a lifesize bronze sculpture. The "Fire Zouave" figure is in close combat with the enemy, swinging his rifle as a club. The monument was designed by Captain John Reed (the 72nd veteran who was arrested), but only the last name of the sculptor is known: Stephens. The sculpture was cast by the Bureau Brothers Foundry in Philadelphia.

About 1000 people attended the July 4, 1891, monument's dedication, and Edward McPherson accepted it on behalf of the GBMA. The GBMA later had second thoughts – on August 25, its executive committee recommended a marker be placed to indicate the GBMA bore "no responsibility for the location of the monument as now placed."

The 72nd's ownership of its statuary tract proved crucial in preventing the Gettysburg Electric Railway from building a tourist trolley across the field of Pickett's Charge. The 72nd denied right-of-way across its tract, forcing the trolley company to find another route (behind the Union line). To reiterate that its tract remained private land, in June 1893, the 72nd marked the boundaries with stone markers, placed a no trespassing sign, and erected a flag pole with the Stars and Stripes (44 stars). The association held the statuary tract until March 20, 1911, when trustees for the survivors' association of the "Seventy-second Regiment Pennsylvania Volunteers" deeded it to the War Department.

The 2011 "Gettysburg" America the Beautiful Quarter was developed "in consultation with representatives of Gettysburg National Military Park." The reverse of the coin features an image of the 72nd regiment's statuary monument. The Codori Barn, visible in the background, was not built until 1882.

High winds blew the 1,500 lb (0.68 t) Fire Zouave sculpture off its pedestal on June 25, 2013, just a week before the 150th anniversary of the Battle of Gettysburg. National Park Service personnel hoisted the slightly damaged sculpture back onto its pedestal the next day, and restored it over the winter.

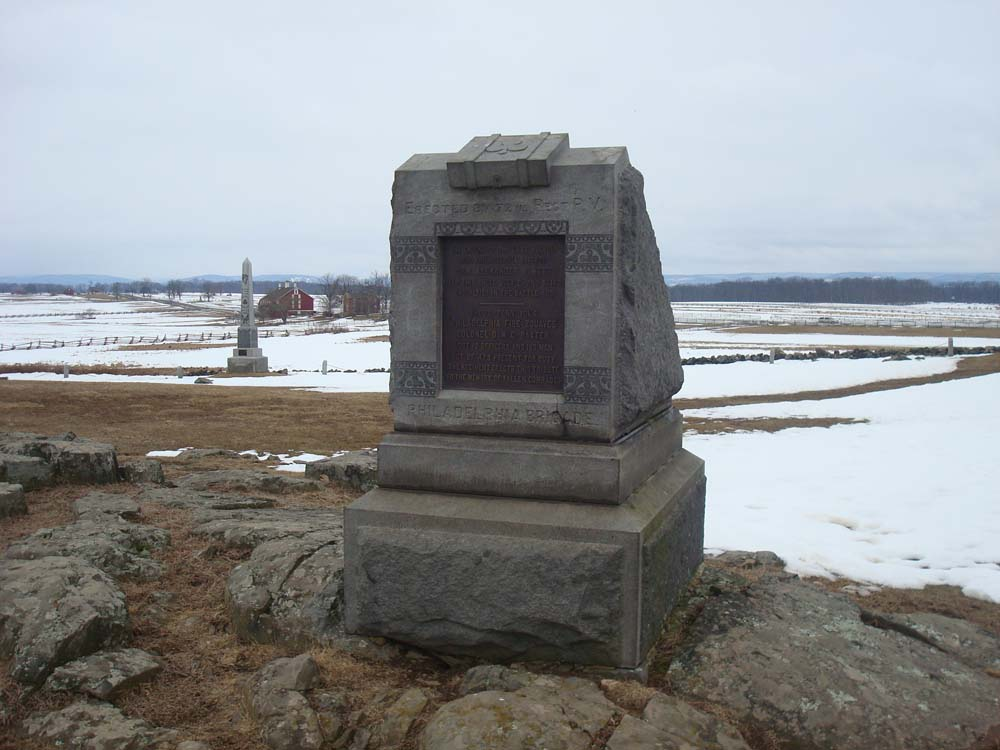
"Philadelphia Brigade" Monument (1883), Hancock & Webb Avenues.

== See also ==
- List of monuments of the Gettysburg Battlefield

External images
- 1904 image of statuary
- HMdb image & text below statue
- Both 72nd monuments in 1 image
