= Turning point of the American Civil War =

Pivotal event in 1861–1865 conflict

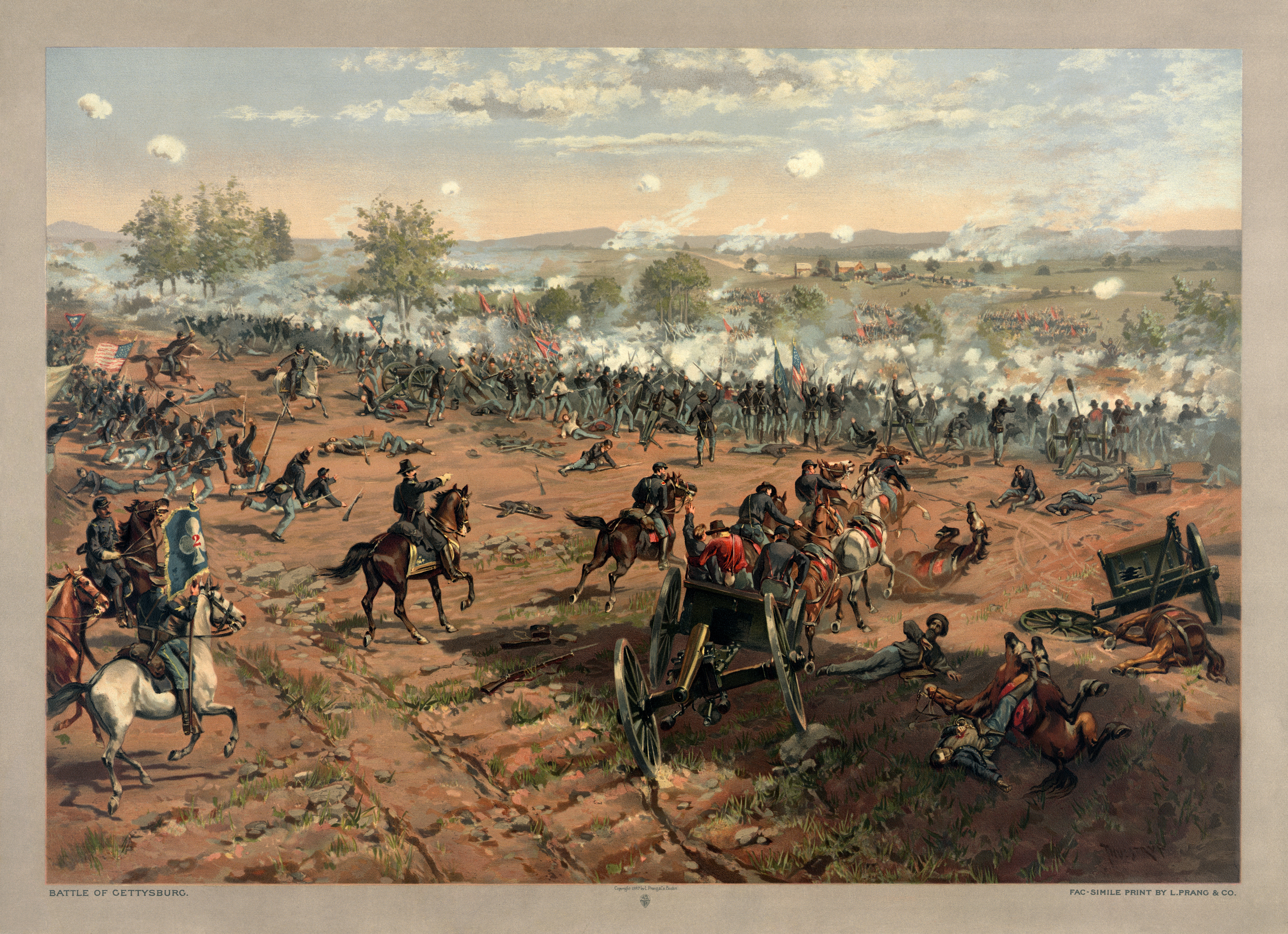
The Battle of Gettysburg, fought July 1–3, 1863, in and around Gettysburg, Pennsylvania, was the deadliest battle of the American Civil War, with over 50,000 casualties. The Union army repelled Robert E. Lee's attempt to invade the North, a defeat often described as a turning point in favor of the Union.

The turning point of the American Civil War refers to a battle or other development after which it became increasingly likely that the Union would prevail. Historians debate which event constituted the war’s turning point. The Union army’s victory at the Battle of Gettysburg (July 1–3, 1863), followed by the Union capture of Vicksburg on July 4, 1863, is most frequently cited as decisive. Several other battles and events throughout the conflict have also been proposed as turning points.

This article provides a chronological listing of military developments sometimes cited as turning points in the war, along with arguments supporting their respective significance. It begins with early victories by the military forces of the Confederate States in the first few months after the Civil War commenced in April 1861, which shaped the plans and resources of the armed forces of the Union in the war, and continues through to the Confederacy’s surrender at Appomattox Court House in April 1865.

Civil War division, 1863 Union states Free territories (Union) Border states (Union slave states) Confederate states Slave territories (contested)

== Confederate invasion of Kentucky (September 1861) ==
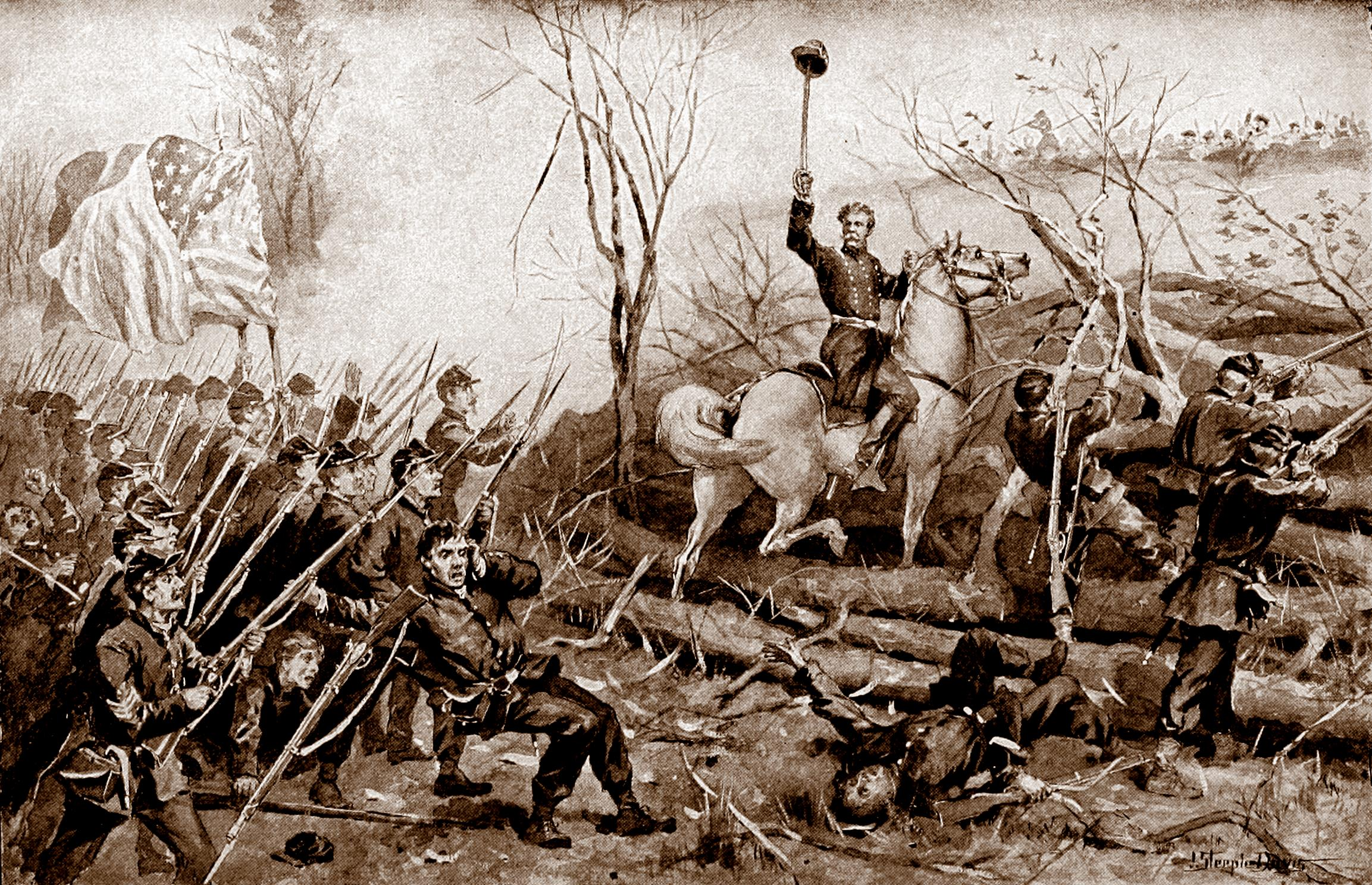
Union assault on Confederate entrenchments at the Battle of Fort Donelson

By mid-1861, eleven states had seceded, but four more slave-owning "border states" remained in the Union, Missouri, Kentucky, Maryland, and Delaware. Kentucky was considered the most at risk; the state legislature had declared neutrality in the dispute, which was seen as a moderately pro-Confederate stance. The loss of Kentucky might have been catastrophic because of its control of the strategic Tennessee and Ohio rivers and its position from which the vital state of Ohio could be invaded. Lincoln wrote, "I think to lose Kentucky is nearly the same as to lose the whole game."

On September 3, 1861, Confederate General Leonidas Polk extended his defensive line north from Tennessee when Gideon Pillow occupied Columbus, Kentucky (in response to Ulysses S. Grant's occupation of Belmont, Missouri, directly across the Mississippi River). Polk followed this by moving through the Cumberland Gap and occupying parts of southeastern Kentucky. This violation of state neutrality enraged many of its citizens; the state legislature, overriding the veto of Governor Beriah Magoffin, requested assistance from the federal government. Kentucky was never again a safe area of operation for Confederate forces. Polk's actions were not directed by the Confederate government. Almost by accident, the Confederacy was placed at an enormous strategic disadvantage. The early Union successes in the Western Theater (the locale of all their successful large-scale non-naval initiatives until 1864) can be directly tied to Polk's blunder.

== Union capture of Forts Henry and Donelson (February 1862) ==
In Tennessee, the capture of Forts Henry and Donelson, and the Confederate surrender at the latter, were the first significant Union victories during the war and the start of a mostly successful campaign in the Western Theater. Ulysses S. Grant completed both actions by February 16, 1862, and by doing so, opened the Tennessee and Cumberland Rivers as Union supply lines and avenues of invasion to Tennessee, Mississippi, and eventually Georgia. The loss of control of these rivers was a significant strategic defeat for the Confederacy. This was the start of offensive actions by Grant that, with the sole exception of the Battle of Shiloh, would continue for the rest of the war. The victories and Grant's successful demand for unconditional surrender were the beginning of intensive press coverage of Grant and would propel his career until he would become leader of the Army of the Potomac, the army that would take Lee's surrender at Appomattox Court House just over three years later.

== Albert Sidney Johnston's death (April 1862) ==
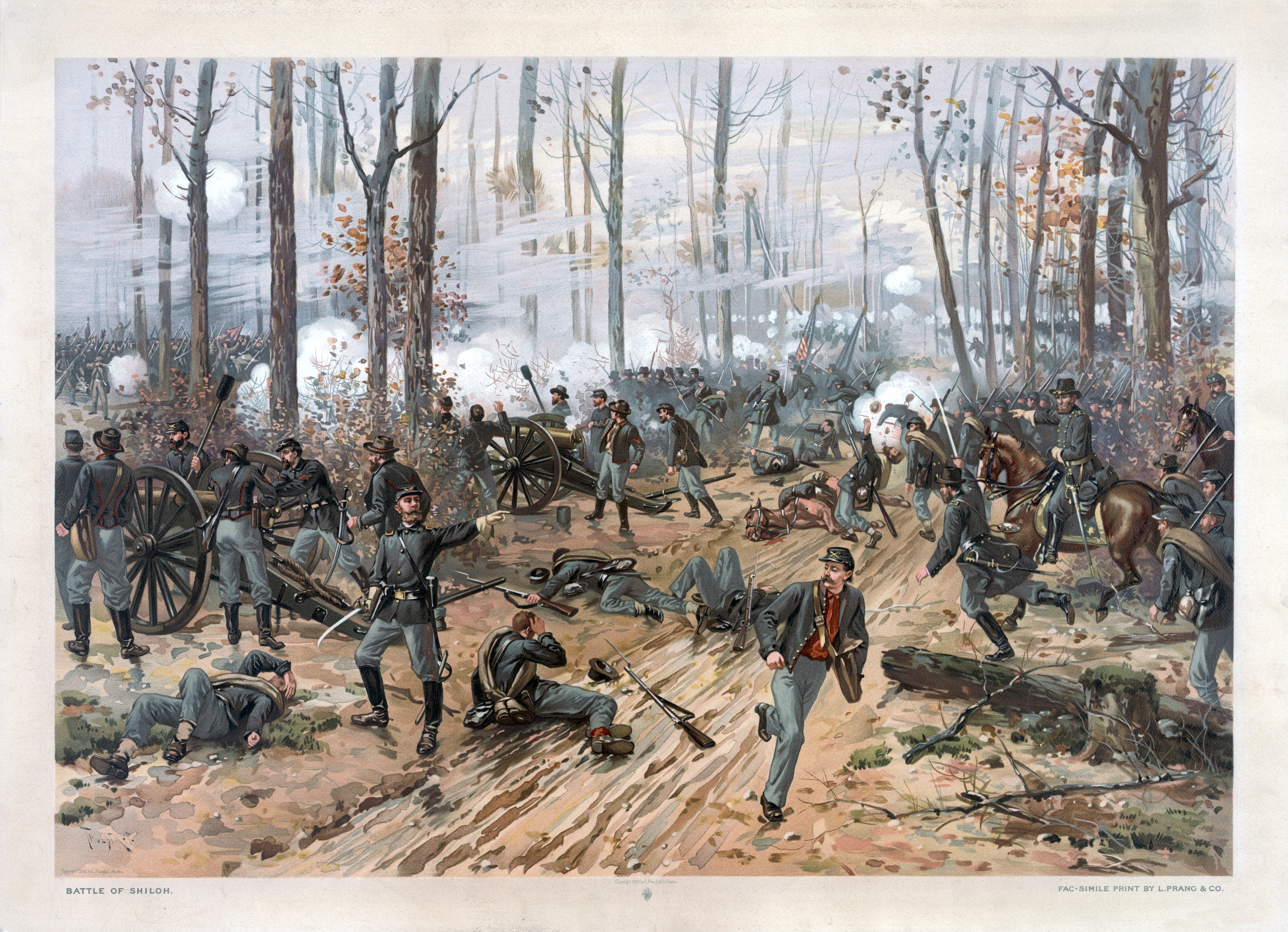
Confederates launch a surprise early morning attack on the Union encampment on the first day of the Battle of Shiloh

Albert Sidney Johnston was considered one of the best generals serving in the Western Theater. By 1862, he commanded all Confederate forces between the Cumberland Gap and Arkansas. Before the battles of Fort Henry and Fort Donelson, Johnston had advocated improving the forts' structures as well as deploying additional troops and arms to more adequately defend them. The Confederate government failed to meet these recommendations. Ulysses S. Grant captured the forts in February 1862 and launched a full-scale invasion of Tennessee. The fall of these forts was inaccurately blamed on Johnston, but he continued to serve.

In March 1862, Johnston organized the Army of Mississippi with P. G. T. Beauregard. He launched his attack at the Battle of Shiloh in April 1862. Johnston's plan was to drive the Union army from its landing point on the Tennessee River into the surrounding swamps. He assigned Beauregard to coordinate the attack. Beauregard disagreed with his strategy and instead planned to drive the enemy back toward the river. He in turn directed reconnaissance at this plan, resulting in the ultimate failure to pinpoint Grant's army. On the first day of battle, Johnston personally led the attack on the enemy. He was possibly a victim of friendly fire, receiving a hit in the knee which severed his popliteal artery. Johnston died within an hour. His death resulted in critical reassignments of his command to less talented generals who failed to repair the virtually doomed Western Theater.

== Union capture of New Orleans (April 1862) ==
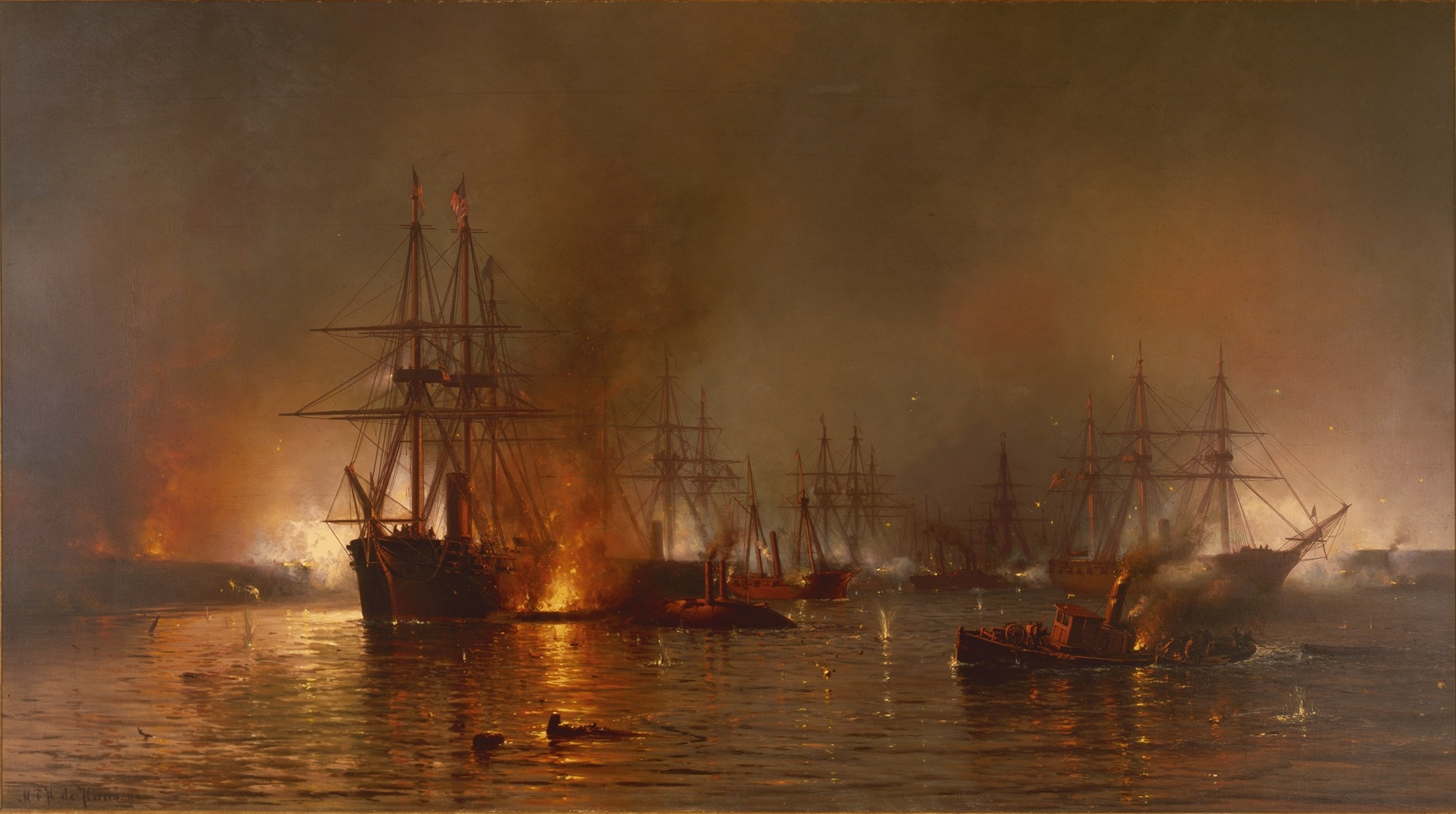
Farragut's fleet forces its way past the downstream forts prior to the capture of New Orleans

Early in the war, Confederate strategists believed the primary threat to New Orleans would come from the north, and made their defensive preparations accordingly. As forces under Grant made gains in the Western Theater, much of the military equipment and manpower in the city's vicinity was sent up the Mississippi River in an attempt to stem the victorious Union tide. When Flag Officer David Farragut was able to force the Union Navy's West Gulf Blockading Squadron past the Confederacy's only two forts below the city in the Battle of Forts Jackson and St. Philip, New Orleans had no means to oppose capture. Thus the port, by far the largest Confederate city, fell undamaged into Union hands, tightening its grip on the Mississippi River and fulfilling a key element of the Anaconda Plan for the South's defeat. Although the occupation under Maj. Gen. Benjamin Butler was detested by the city's antebellum elites, he was astute enough to build a base of political support among the poorer classes and create an extensive intelligence and counterespionage capability, nullifying the threat of insurrection. The Confederacy's loss of its greatest port had significant diplomatic consequences. Confederate agents abroad were generally received more coolly, if at all, after news of the city's capture reached London and Paris.

== Union victory at Battle of Antietam (September 1862) ==
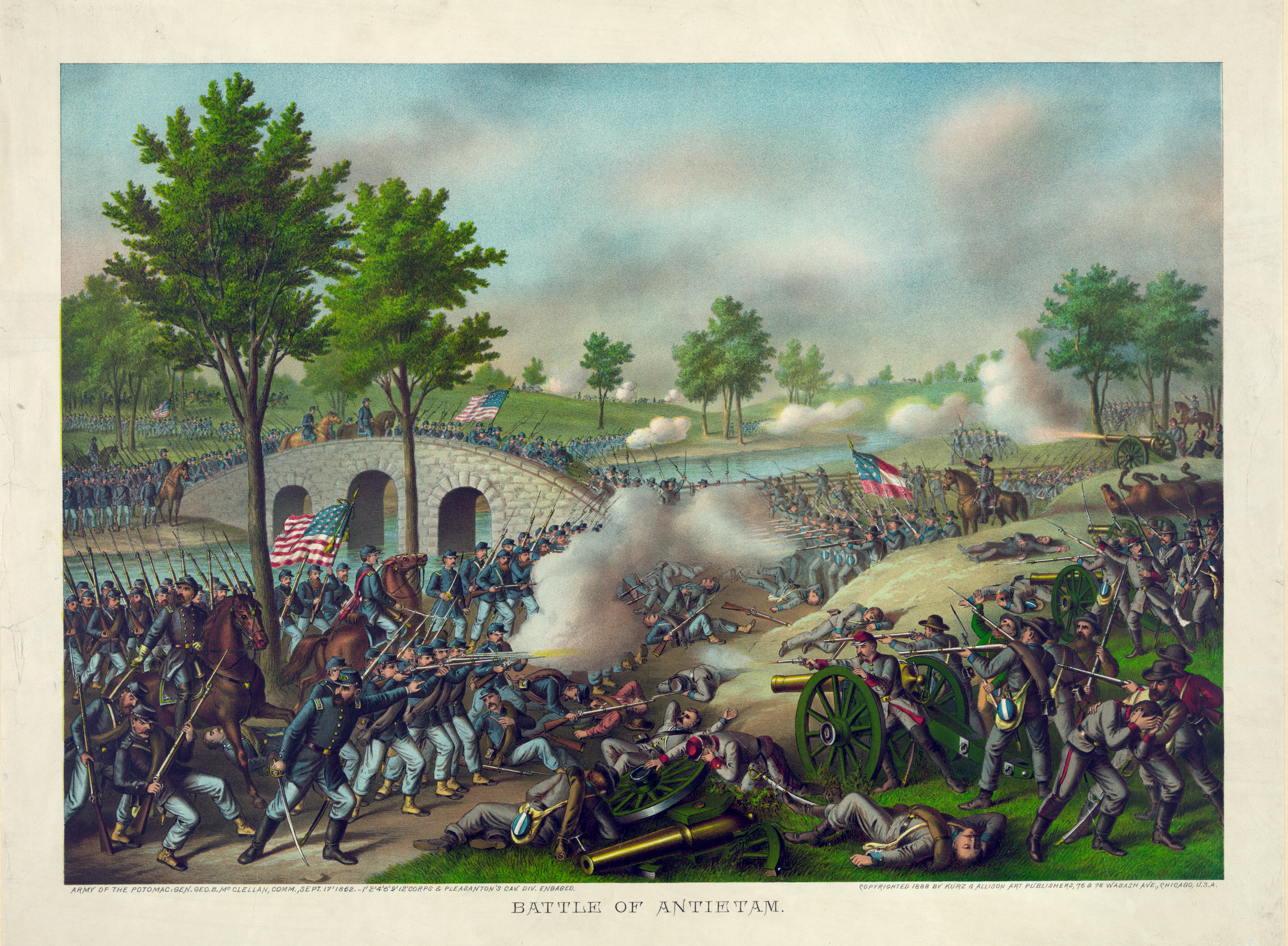
Union forces cross Burnside's Bridge at the Battle of Antietam

The Battle of Antietam, fought September 17, 1862, was the bloodiest single day of conflict in American military history. But it also had two strategic consequences. Although considered a tactical draw between the Army of the Potomac and the much smaller Army of Northern Virginia, it marked the end of Robert E. Lee's invasion of the North. One of his goals was to entice the slave-holding state of Maryland to join the Confederacy, or at least recruit soldiers there. He failed in that objective; he also failed in marshaling Northern fears and opinions to pressure a settlement to the war.

But more strategically, George B. McClellan's victory was just convincing enough that President Lincoln thought it time to announce his preliminary Emancipation Proclamation, which stated that, one hundred days later, on January 1, 1863, he would issue his final Emancipation Proclamation, proclaiming all slaves in states in rebellion to be free. He had been counseled by his cabinet to postpone issuing the preliminary Emancipation Proclamation until a Union battlefield victory could be announced, lest it appear to be an act of desperation. Along with its immense effect on American history and race relations, the Emancipation Proclamation effectively prevented Britain from extending diplomatic recognition to the Confederacy. The British public held strong anti-slavery beliefs and would not have tolerated measures which helped the pro-slavery Confederate government now that ending slavery was a prominent Union war aim. This greatly diminished the Confederacy's hopes of surviving a lengthy war against the North's suffocating naval blockade. France supporting the Confederacy was still a possibility, but it never came to pass. Antietam and two other coincident failed actions—Braxton Bragg's invasion of Kentucky (sometimes called the "high-water mark of the Confederacy in the Western Theater") and Earl Van Dorn's advance against Corinth, Mississippi—represented the Confederacy's only attempts at coordinated strategic offensives in multiple theaters of war.

== Stonewall Jackson's death (May 1863) ==
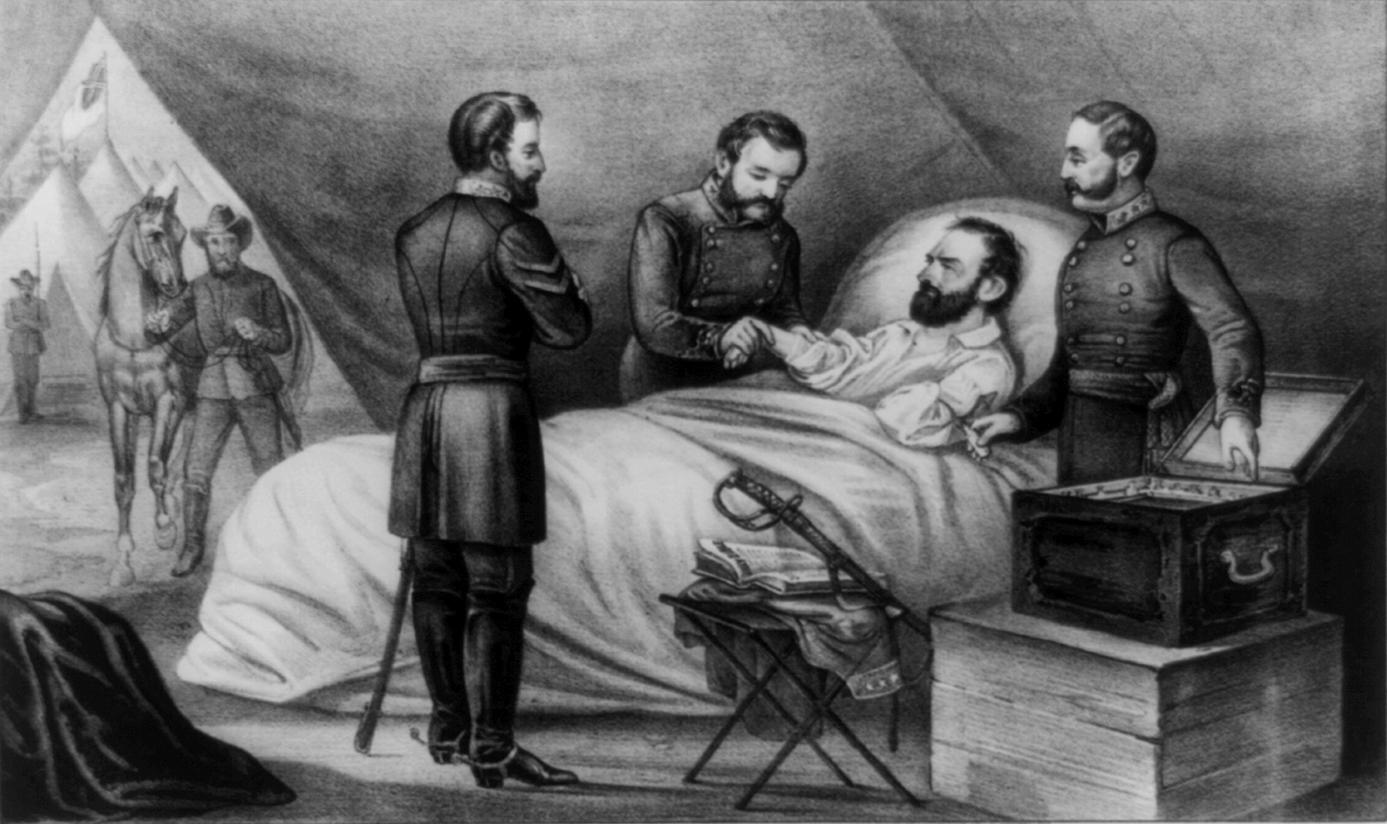
Stonewall Jackson on his deathbed in May 1863, following a friendly fire incident

After winning the Battle of Chancellorsville, the Army of Northern Virginia lost Lt. Gen. Stonewall Jackson to pneumonia following a friendly fire accident. His death was a blow to the morale of the Confederate Army, since he was considered one of its most popular and successful commanders. Two months later, Robert E. Lee had no general with Jackson's audacity available at the Battle of Gettysburg. Many historians argue that Jackson might have succeeded in seizing key battlefield positions, including Culp's Hill and Cemetery Hill at the end of the first day of fighting in the Battle of Gettysburg, which his replacements were unable or unwilling to take. Lee shared this belief, telling his subordinate generals on different occasions that they should have acted like Jackson would have.

== Battle of Gettysburg and Union capture of Vicksburg (July 1863) ==
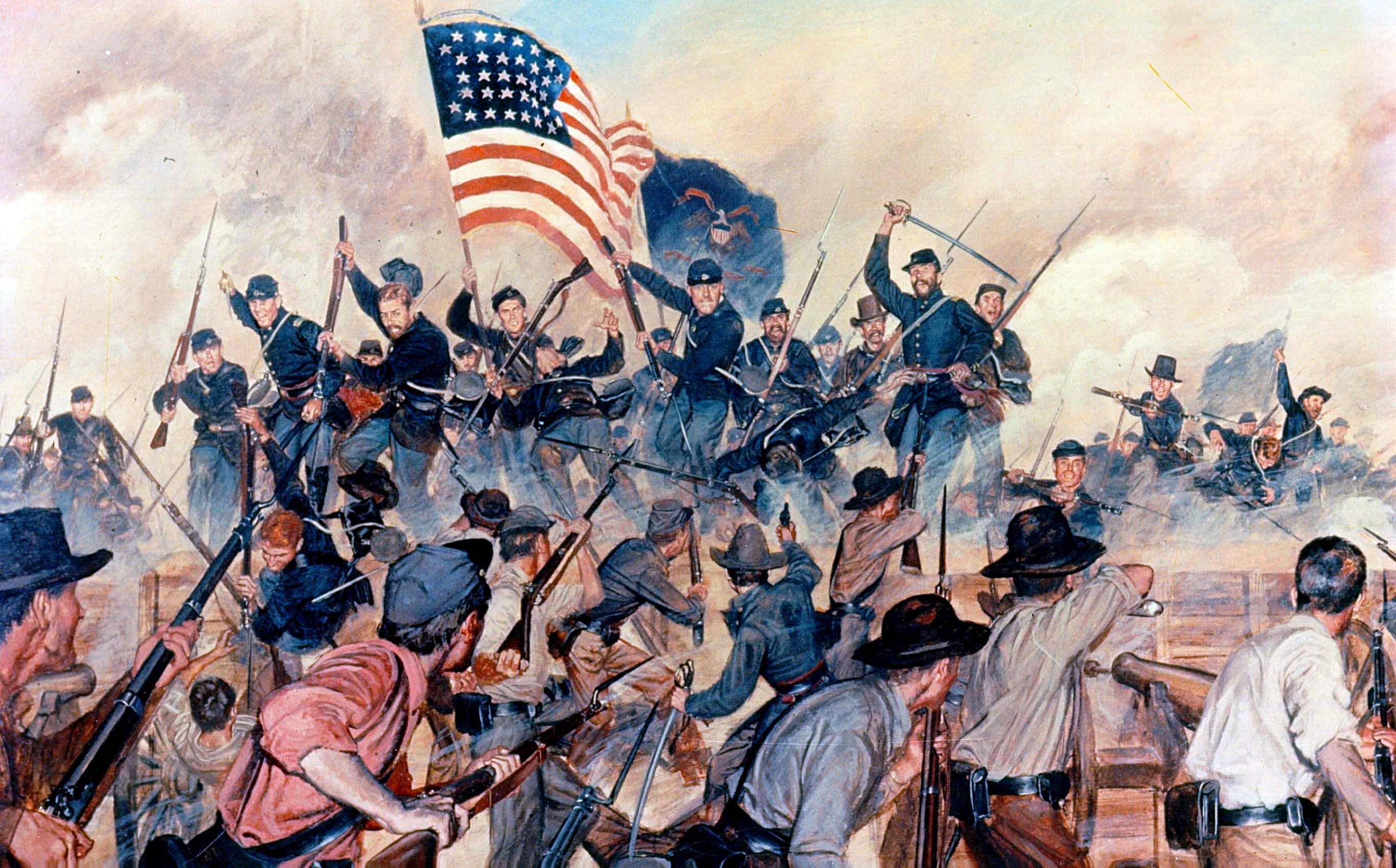
A Union battalion scales the defenses of Vicksburg in a costly failed assault ordered by Grant early in the siege

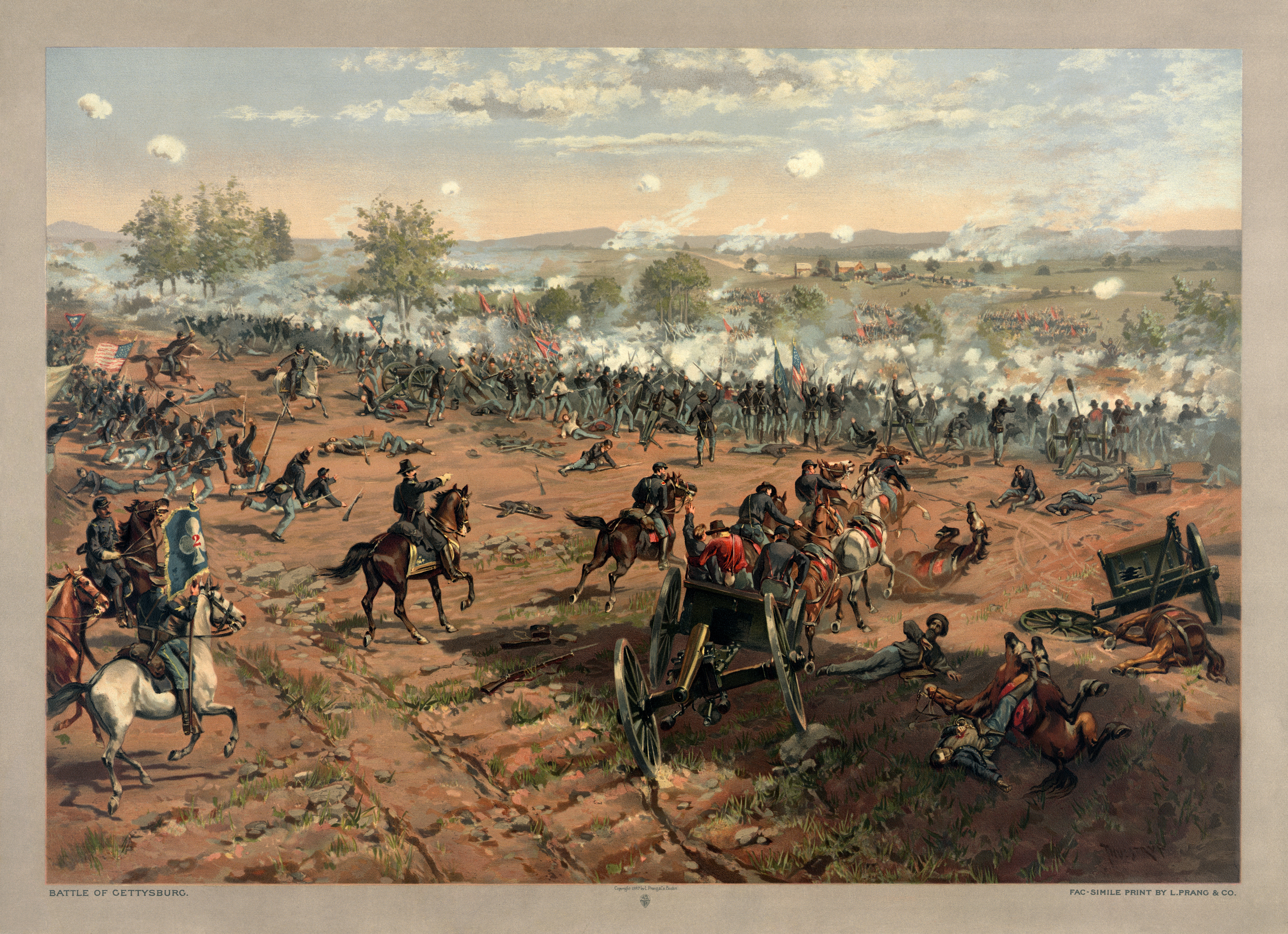
Union troops repulsed Pickett's Charge on the last day of the Battle of Gettysburg, fought on July 3, 1863.

During the Battle of Gettysburg, a three-day battle fought between July 1 and July 3, 1863, the Union army, led by Maj. Gen. George Meade, repelled an attempt by the Confederate Army general Robert E. Lee to penetrate the North. The Battle of Gettysburg resulted in over 50,000 Confederate and Union casualties, the most of both any Civil War battle and any battle in American military history. The Union victory in the Battle of Gettysburg is routinely cited as the war's turning point, representing a decisive and strategic Union victory that altered the war in the Union's favor and led ultimately to the nation's preservation. The day following the Union victory in the Battle of Gettysburg, on July 4, 1863, the most important Confederate stronghold, located on the Mississippi River in Vicksburg, Mississippi, also fell to the Union, in the Siege of Vicksburg.

During the three-day battle, the Union's Army of the Potomac decisively repelled Lee's second attempt to invade the North, resulting in extensive casualties on Lee's Army of Northern Virginia. The National Park Service marks the point at which Pickett's Charge collapsed, a copse of trees on Cemetery Ridge, as the high-water mark of the Confederacy. From this point onward, Lee ceased attempting strategic offensive military attacks against the Union. While the Civil War endured for two additional years and the Union ultimately concluded that a more aggressive military approach, which Union general Ulysses S. Grant brought to the war, was required to fully subdue the Confederates, any realistic probability of a Confederate victory ended with the Confederate defeat in the Battle of Gettysburg and its subsequent loss of its stronghold in Vicksburg. Two years later, at Appomattox Court House in 1865, the Civil War ended in the Union's favor.

While Gettysburg was seen by military and civilian observers at the time as a great battle, those in the North were less aware that two more bloody years would be required to ultimately end the Civil War in the Union's favor. Lincoln was distraught following Meade's failure to engage Lee and his Confederate troops as they retreated from Gettysburg, believing that doing so might have led to a Union victory and the Civil War's end. Southern morale deteriorated substantially following the Union victories at Gettysburg and Vicksburg, creating a perception among Confederate forces that "the coil was tightening around us".

Some economic historians also observe that the Confederate defeats in Gettysburg and Vicksburg led to a precipitous drop in the market for Confederate war bonds. "… European investors gave the Confederacy approximately a 42 percent chance of victory prior to the battle of Gettysburg/Vicksburg. News of the severity of the two rebel defeats led to a sell-off in Confederate bonds. By the end of 1863, the probability of a Southern victory fell to about 15 percent [in the bond market]."

The loss of the Confederate stronghold at Vicksburg split the Confederacy in two, denying it any further movement along or across the Mississippi River and preventing supplies from Texas and Arkansas, which may have allowed Confederate forces to prevent Union forces from progressing east of it. Lincoln echoed this sentiment, saying: "See what a lot of land these fellows hold, of which Vicksburg is the key! The war can never be brought to a close until that key is in our pocket.... We can take all the northern ports of the Confederacy and they can defy us from Vicksburg."

== Union victory in the Chattanooga Campaign (November 1863) ==
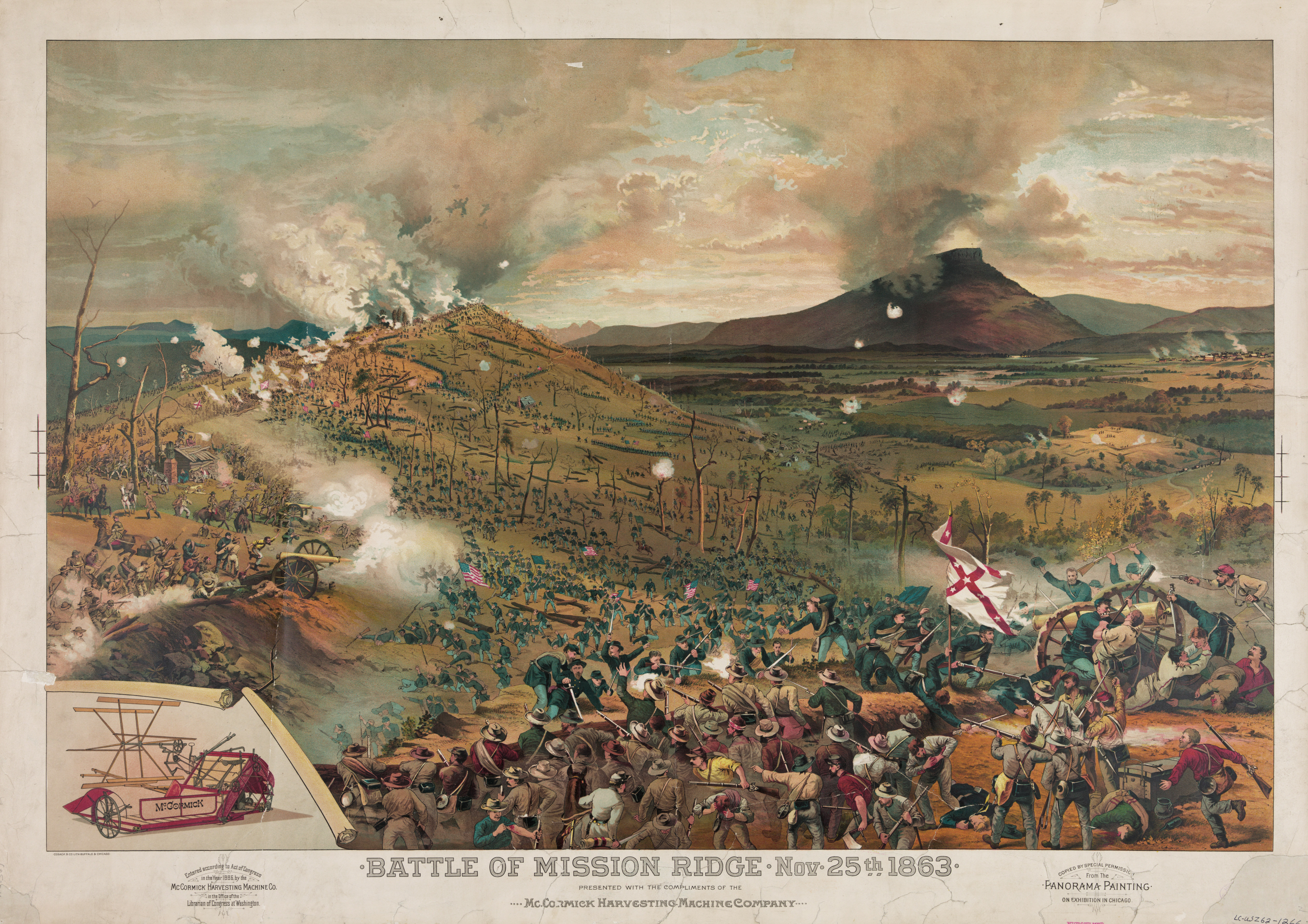
In one of the war's most dramatic events, a spontaneous Union infantry advance carries Missionary Ridge near Chattanooga, Tennessee, taking a position widely viewed as one that should have been impregnable

Military historian J. F. C. Fuller contended that Grant's defeat of Braxton Bragg's army during the Chattanooga campaign was the turning point of the war because it reduced the Confederacy to the Atlantic coast and opened the way for William T. Sherman's Atlanta campaign and March to the Sea.

== Grant's appointment as Union general-in-chief (March 1864) ==
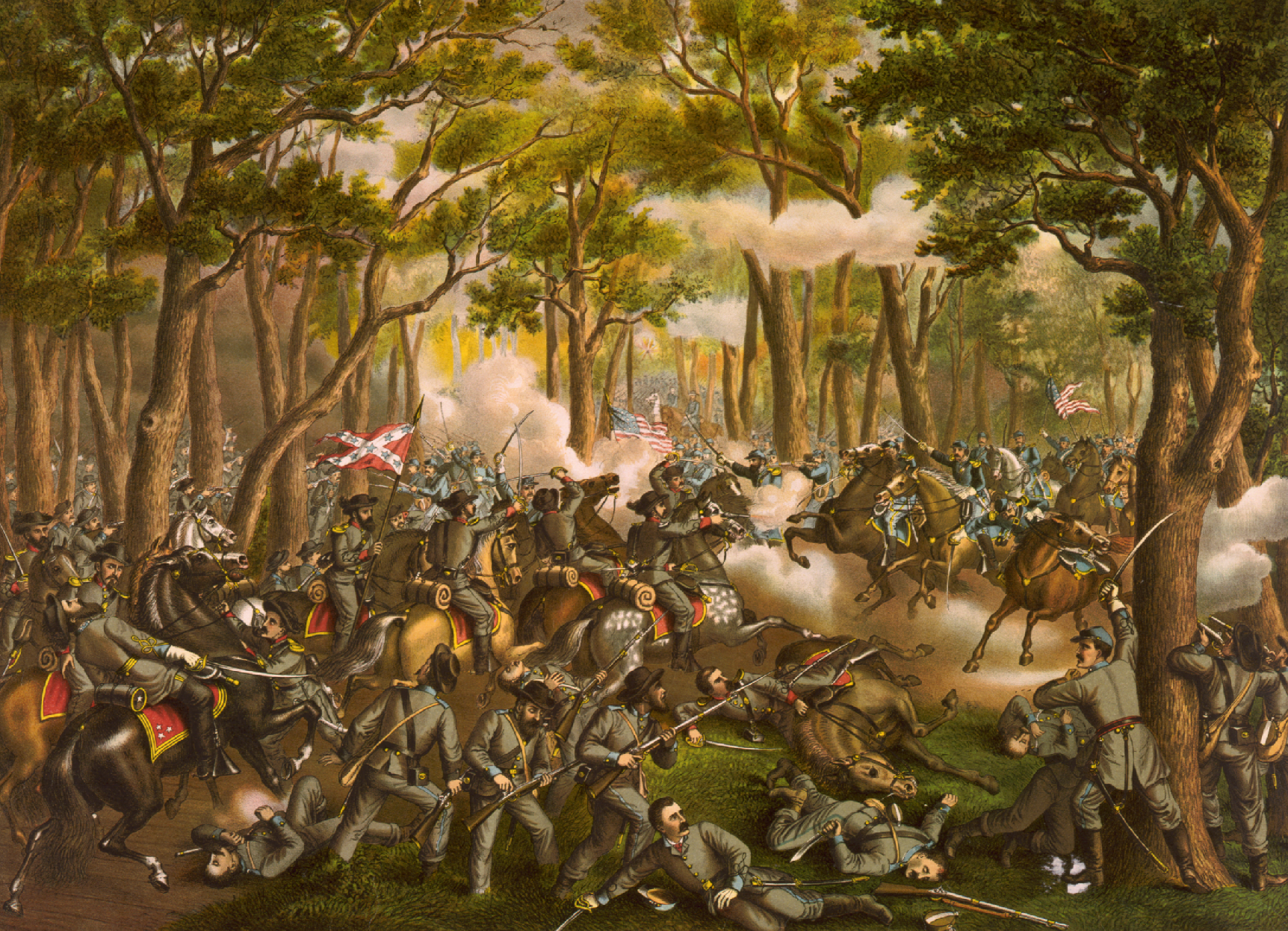
The Battle of the Wilderness, May 1864, early in the Overland Campaign

Following the victory at Chattanooga, Grant was appointed general-in-chief of all Union armies on March 12, 1864. Leaving Sherman in command of forces in the Western Theater, he moved his headquarters east to Virginia. Previous Union commanders in the critical Eastern Theater had not mounted effective campaigns, or successful pursuits of Confederate forces after gaining rare victories. Grant devised a coordinated strategy that would strike at the Confederacy from multiple directions: against Lee and the Confederate capital, Richmond; in the Shenandoah Valley; against Johnston and Atlanta; against railroad supply lines in western Virginia; and against the port of Mobile. In May, Grant launched the Overland Campaign towards Richmond, an attritional campaign that took full advantage of the North's edge in population and resources. Although he suffered a tactical reverse in his first encounter with Lee in the Battle of the Wilderness, Grant pressed forward, putting the Confederates under an unremitting pressure that was maintained until the fall of their capital and the surrender of Lee's Army of Northern Virginia.

== Union capture of Atlanta (September 1864) ==
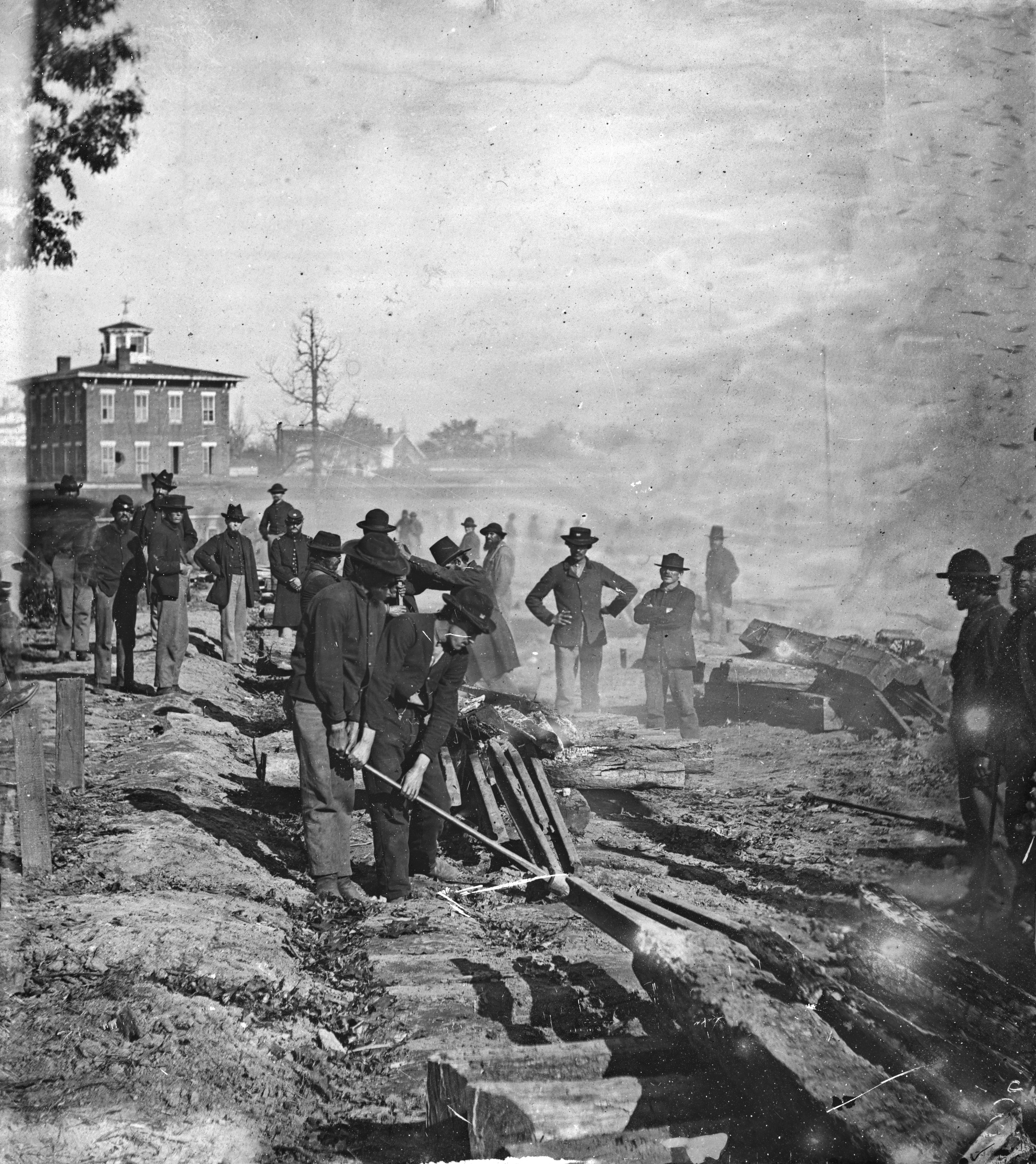
Sherman's troops destroy a railroad in Battle of Atlanta

Some contend that Sherman's successful siege of Atlanta was the turning point, since the heavily fortified city was the most critical remaining stronghold in the South. The capture of Atlanta, following a tedious and frustrating campaign, lifted the spirits of Union forces just in time to build the popular support necessary to re-elect Lincoln. Its military assault also crippled transportation in the heart of the Confederacy, nearly destroying the city.

== Lincoln's reelection (November 1864) ==
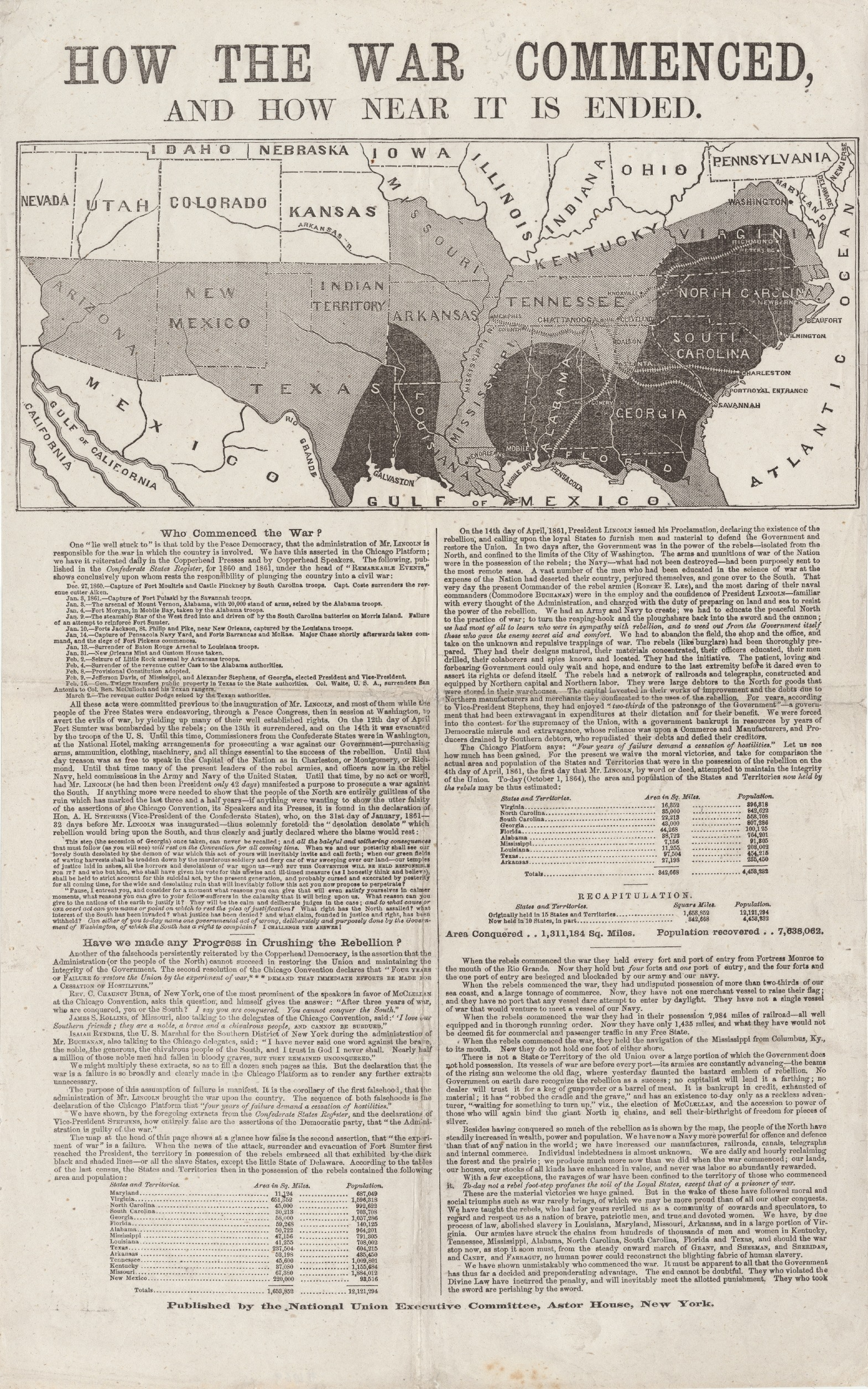
A pro-Lincoln campaign poster on October 1, 1864, weeks prior to the 1864 presidential election in which Lincoln won a second term

The reelection of Abraham Lincoln in 1864 is beyond the final point at which a positive conclusion for the Confederacy could have been contemplated. His opponent, former general George B. McClellan, ran on a Democratic Party platform that favored a negotiated settlement with the Confederacy. Although McClellan disavowed this platform, the South would have likely seen his election as a strategic victory. Thus, Lincoln's success may have further emboldened belief, on both sides, that the war would end with the Union's original ambition achieved.

== See also ==
- Conclusion of the American Civil War
