= High Water Mark of the Rebellion Monument =

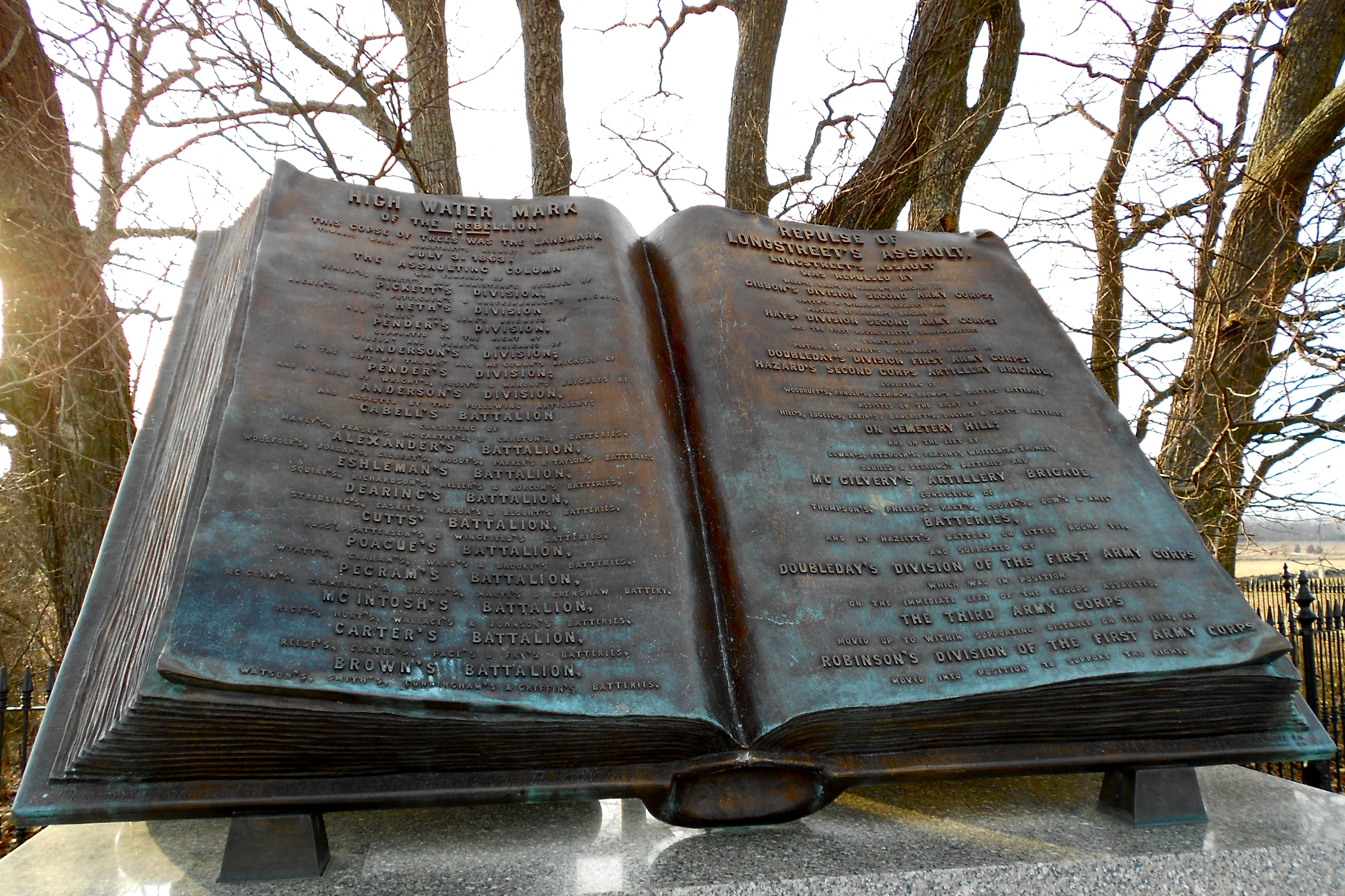
- The front tablet on the High Water Mark of the Rebellion Monument is on a pedestal (bottom) in front of the Copse of Trees
- Interactive map of High Water Mark of the Rebellion Monument
- Location: Gettysburg National Military Park, Pennsylvania
- Coordinates: 39°48.747′N 77°14.143′W
- Designer: John B. Bachelder
- Dedicated date: 1892

The High Water Mark of the Rebellion Monument is a Gettysburg Battlefield memorial which identifies the Confederate Army of Northern Virginia units of the infantry attack on the Battle of Gettysburg, third day, with a large bronze tablet, as well as the Union Army of the Potomac's "respective troops who met or assisted to repulse Longstreet's Assault." The memorial is named for the line of dead and wounded of Pickett's Charge which marked the deepest penetration into the Union line at The Angle when "4,500 men threw down their arms and came in as prisoners". The line is now generally marked with unit monuments which are also historic district contributing structures. The High Water Mark monument is accessible via Hancock Avenue which has parking spaces alongside, and a path leads to the site from a parking lot at the former Cyclorama Building at Gettysburg, which served for fifty years as a Gettysburg Battlefield visitor center by the National Park Service until it was demolished in 2013.

== History ==
The monument's designer identified the turning point of Pickett's Charge, as "unquestionably the "high water mark of this battle, and of the war!" " After Bachelder's monument proposal was denied by the Gettysburg Battlefield Memorial Association two years in a row, it was approved in the third year. Erected by April 27, 1892, the monument was recast to add two missing units and then dedicated with a speech by then-former Governor Beaver advocating the battlefield become a National Park. The Marine Corps Band provided music, short addresses were made by Union Generals Schofield, Slocum, Webb, Veazey, and others, and Samuel M. Swope presented the monument to John M. Vanderslice of the Gettysburg Battlefield Memorial Association.

An 1895 tablet (MN389) was added to the memorial to identify the Gettysburg Battlefield Memorial Association directors, and the memorial was the site of an 1897 lecture by James T. Long to 7,097 excursionists at The Angle.
