= Cemetery Ridge =

- U.S. Historic district – Contributing property
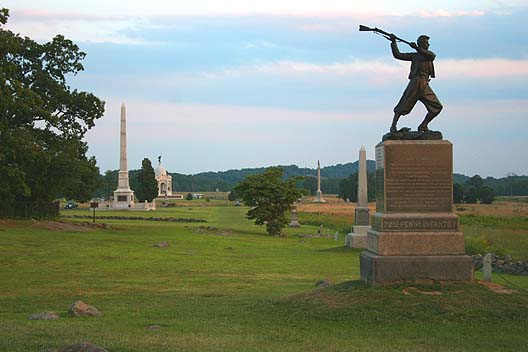
- Cemetery Ridge on the Gettysburg Battlefield, August 2005

- Location within Pennsylvania
- Location: Adams County, Pennsylvania
- Coordinates: 39.818056°N 77.2325°W
- Part of: Gettysburg Battlefield Historic District (ID75000155)
- MPS: Battle of Gettysburg MPS
- Added to NRHP: March 19, 1975

Cemetery Ridge is a geographic feature in Gettysburg National Military Park, south of the town of Gettysburg, Pennsylvania, that figured prominently in the Battle of Gettysburg, July 1 to July 3, 1863. It formed a primary defensive position for the Union Army during the battle, roughly the center of what is popularly known as the "fish-hook" line. The Confederate States Army launched attacks on the Union positions on the second and third days of the battle, but were driven back both times.

== Description ==
The ridge rises only about 40 feet (12 m) above the surrounding terrain and is under 2 miles (3.2 km) long. The northern end rises to become Cemetery Hill, the southern descends to low, wooded, and sometimes marshy ground just north of Little Round Top. At the northern end of Cemetery Ridge is a copse of trees and a low stone wall that makes two 90-degree turns; the latter has been nicknamed The Angle and is also referred to as the High Water Mark of the Confederacy. This area, and the nearby Codori Farm on Emmitsburg Road, were prominent features in the progress of Pickett's Charge during the third day of battle, as well as Major General Richard H. Anderson's division assault on the second.

== American Civil War ==
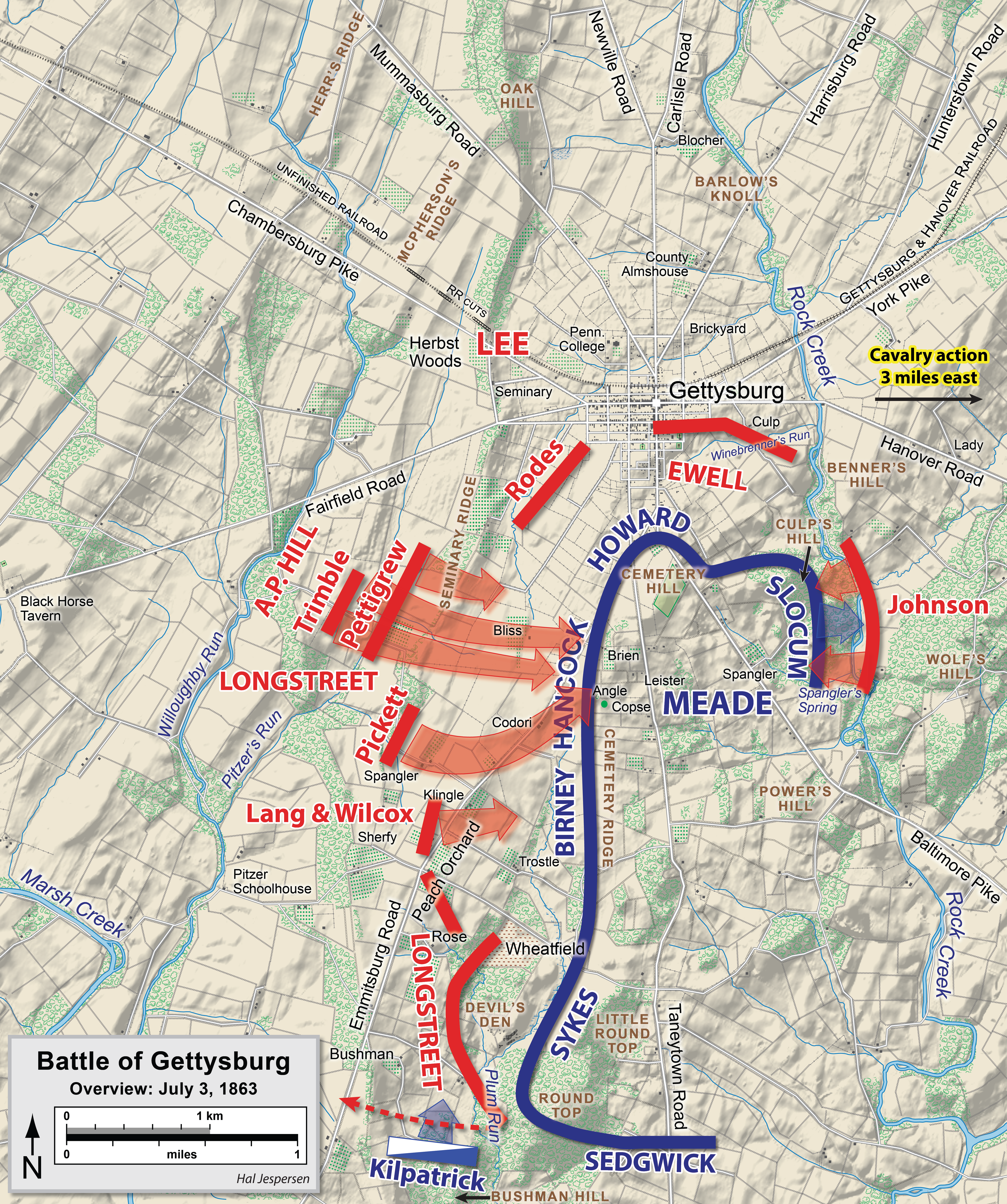
Overview map of the third day of the Battle of Gettysburg, July 3, 1863. The north-south Union line (in blue) follows Cemetery Ridge.

On the first day of the Battle of Gettysburg, Cemetery Ridge was unoccupied for much of the day until the Union army retreated from its positions north of town, when the divisions of Brig. Gen. John C. Robinson and Maj. Gen. Abner Doubleday from the I Corps were placed on the northern end of the ridge, protecting the left flank of the XI Corps on Cemetery Hill. After the XII Corps arrived, Maj. Gen. John W. Geary's Second Division was sent to the southern end of the ridge near Little Round Top; Brig. Gen. John Buford's cavalry division formed a skirmish line in the fields between Cemetery Ridge and Seminary Ridge. The III Corps arrived about 8 p.m. and replaced Geary's division (which was sent to Culp's Hill); the II Corps arrived about 10:30 p.m. and camped immediately behind the III Corps.

During the morning of the battle's 2nd day (July 2), Army of the Potomac commander Maj. Gen. George G. Meade shifted units to receive an expected Confederate attack on his positions. The II Corps was placed in the center of Cemetery Ridge, with Brig. Gen. Alexander Hays's division on the corps' right, John Gibbon's division in the center around the Angle, and John C. Caldwell's division on the left, adjacent to the III Corps; Robinson's division of the I Corps was placed in reserve behind the XI Corps. The V Corps was formed in reserve behind the II Corps. In the late afternoon, the end of the Confederate Maj. Gen. Lafayette McLaws's assault drove portions of Maj. Gen. Daniel Sickles's III Corps line back to the southern end of Cemetery Ridge, and Brig. Gen. Ambrose Wright's Confederate brigade temporarily captured the southern end of the Angle before being driven back to Seminary Ridge by the Philadelphia Brigade.

The Confederate artillery bombardment preceding Pickett's Charge on July 3 battered Cemetery Ridge, and Union artillery on the ridge counter-fired to Seminary Ridge. Thirty-four Union cannons were disabled, but the three Confederate divisions of the subsequent infantry assault (Pickett's of the First Corps and Pettigrew's and Trimble's of the Third Corps), attacked the Union II Corps at the "stone fence" at the Angle. Heavy rifle and artillery fire prevented all but about 250 Confederates led by Lewis Armistead from penetrating the Union line to the high water mark of the Confederacy. Armistead was mortally wounded. Two brigades of Anderson's Division, assigned to protect Pickett's right flank during the charge, reached a more southern portion of the Union line at Cemetery Ridge soon after the repulse of Pickett's Division, but were driven back with 40% casualties by the 2nd Vermont Brigade.

== Postbellum history ==
The Gettysburg Battlefield Memorial Association purchased rights-of-way for an avenue and monuments along the ridge, and the 1884 Round Top Branch steam railroad was built across the southern end of Cemetery Ridge. The 1893 Gettysburg Electric Railway was built across the north end of the ridge, and several Gettysburg Battlefield camps after the American Civil War used the ridge's west slope at the Angle (e.g., for Eisenhower's 1918 Camp Colt and during the 1938 Gettysburg reunion). The 1962 Cyclorama Building at Gettysburg with observation deck replaced the 1896 observation tower at the ridge's Zeigler's Grove, but was closed in 2008.

== See also ==
- Cemetery Hill — also on the battlefield.
- 1st Minnesota Volunteer Infantry
