= 72nd Pennsylvania Infantry Regiment =

Union Army volunteer infantry regiment

72nd Pennsylvania Volunteer Infantry
- Pennsylvania flag
- Active: August 1861 to June 24, 1864
- Country: United States
- Allegiance: Union
- Branch: Infantry
- Engagements: Battle of Ball's Bluff; Battle of Savage's Station; Battle of Malvern Hill; Battle of South Mountain; Battle of Antietam; Battle of Fredericksburg; Battle of Gettysburg; Overland Campaign

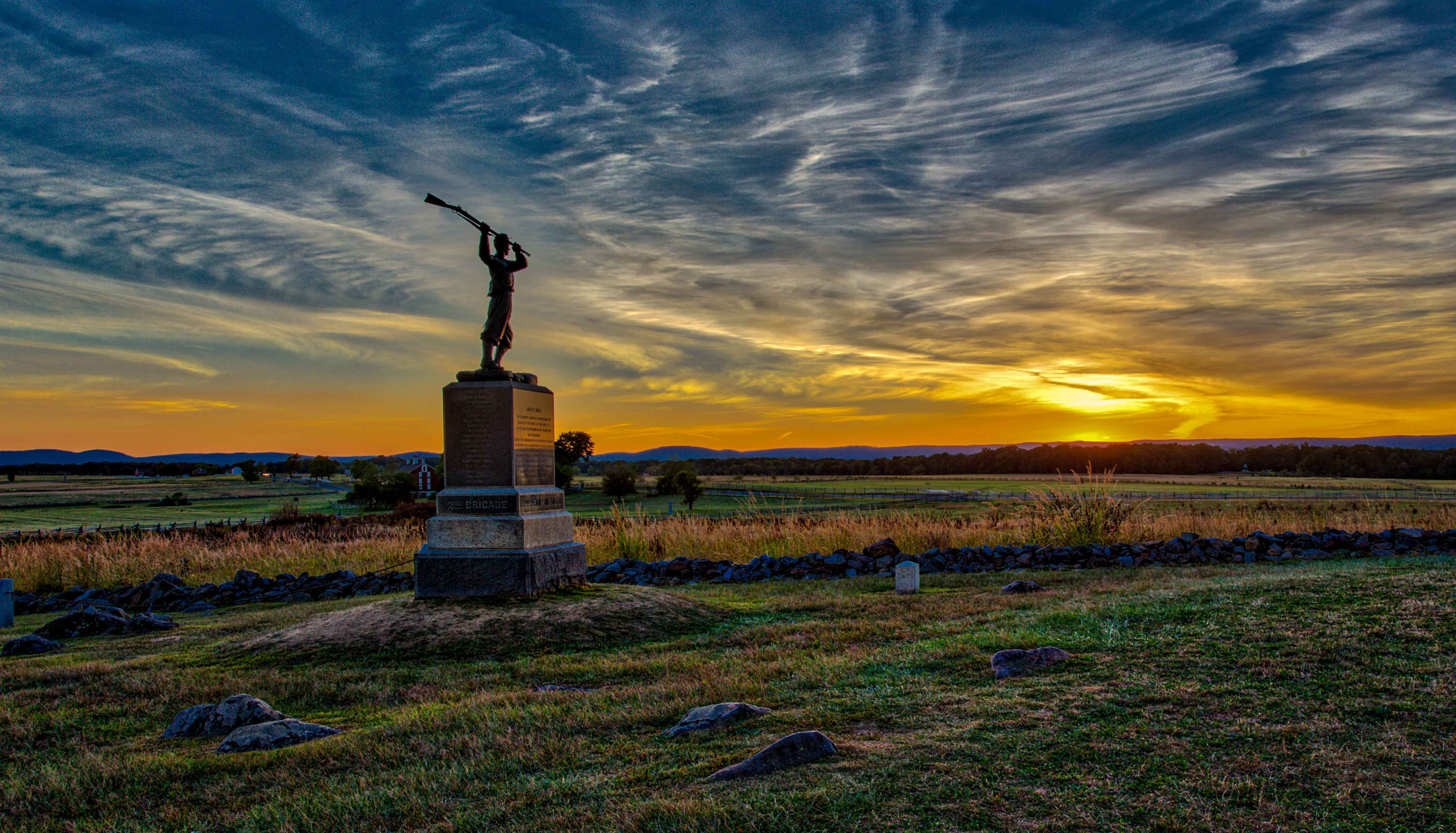
The 72nd Pennsylvania Infantry Monument on the Gettysburg Battlefield

The 72nd Pennsylvania Infantry (originally raised as the 3rd California) was a volunteer infantry regiment which served in the Union Army during the American Civil War. It was part of the famous Philadelphia Brigade.

Members of this regiment wore a modified zouave-style uniform, consisting of a zouave jacket trimmed with red without a tombeaux on the jacket, sky-blue trousers with a red stripe down the leg, a sky-blue zouave vest trimmed in red, white gaiters, and a dark blue kepi with red piping. The jacket was decorated with 16 ball brass buttons down the front of the jacket, which were not part of the original French Zouave uniform.

== History ==
Colonel Edward D. Baker, powerful congressman and close friend of President Lincoln, organized the Third California Volunteer Infantry Regiment in Philadelphia, one of four regiments of the California Brigade. Baker wanted the brigade to represent and give credit to California in the Federal army. The regiment was recruited from among the firemen of Philadelphia, Pennsylvania in early August 1861. DeWitt Clinton Baxter was its colonel, Theodore Hesser lieutenant colonel, and J. M. De Witt major.

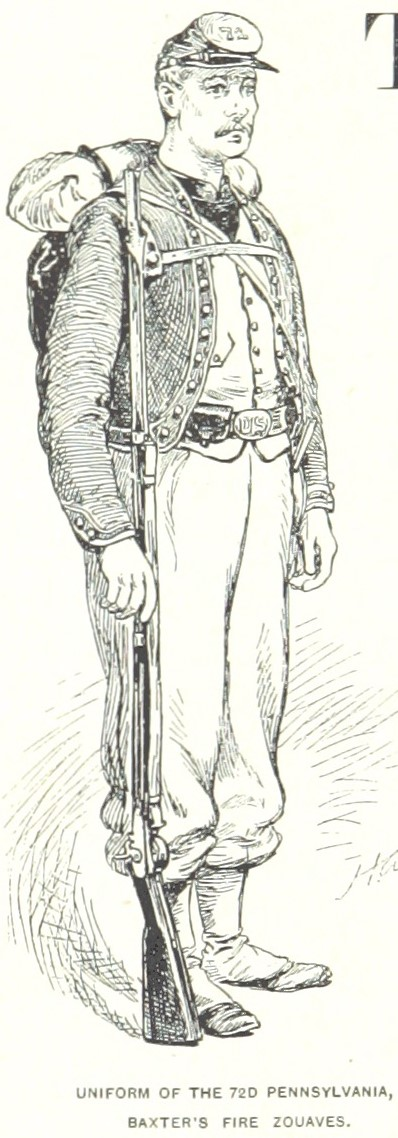
The uniform of the regiment

After Baker's death October 21, 1861 at the Battle of Ball's Bluff, Pennsylvania reclaimed the regiments as its own. The California Brigade became the Philadelphia Brigade and each unit was given a new number. The Third California Regiment became the 72nd Pennsylvania Regiment. After some months of patrolling along the Potomac River, the 72nd was transported to the Peninsula. It saw its first action at the Battle of Seven Pines on May 1, 1862. During the Seven Days Battles, it supported the army's rear guard.

The 72nd saw light skirmishing at the Battle of Chantilly. At the Battle of Antietam, the regiment participated in the attack on the West Woods, being routed along with much of the rest of the division. Nearly half of the regiment was lost, including several officers killed.

At the Battle of Gettysburg, it defended the Angle on July 2 and 3. On the evening of the 2nd, it helped defeat Confederate Brigade General Ambrose R. Wright's attack, advancing just over the stone wall. The next day, it was placed in reserve for the brigade near the copse of trees. During Pickett's Charge, its position served as a rallying point for the left wing of the 71st and two companies of the 106th Pennsylvania, which had been driven back. Despite Brigadier General Alexander S. Webb's best efforts, these troops refused to counterattack for several minutes. This might have been due to the 71st's colorbearers being shot down. (Civil War regiments often followed the regimental flag since orders would have been difficult to hear on the battlefield.) The regiment though, after realizing the error and miscommunication charged and plugged in the gap. At Gettysburg, Col. Baxter replaced the wounded General Webb in command of the Brigade, and Lt. Col. Hesser replaced him in command of the 72nd Regiment.

The unit fought well during the Overland Campaign and in the beginning stages of the Siege of Petersburg. On June 24, 1864, the regiment was mustered out of service.

A total of 1,600 men fought in the 72nd, of whom 1,053 became casualties, a 65% casualty rate.

== Casualties during the war ==
- Killed and mortally wounded: 12 officers, 198 enlisted men
- Wounded: 25 officers, 533 enlisted men
- Died of disease: 1 officers, 119 enlisted men
- Captured or missing: 2 officers, 163 men
- Total casualties: 40 officers, 1,014 enlisted men

== See also ==
- List of Pennsylvania Civil War Units
- 72nd Pennsylvania Infantry Monument
