= David McConaughy =

American politician

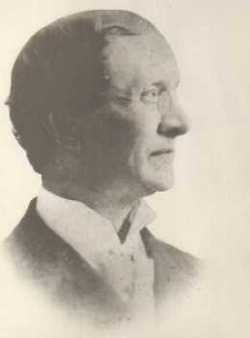
- Archived Photo from 1903 of David McConaughy

Member of the Pennsylvania Senate from the 19th district
- In office 1867- 1868

Personal details
- Born: July 13, 1823 Gettysburg, Pennsylvania, US
- Died: January 14, 1902 (aged 78) Gettysburg, Pennsylvania, US

David McConaughy (July 13, 1823 – January 14, 1902) was a noted attorney, state senator, cemetery president, and civic leader in Gettysburg, Pennsylvania and a part-time intelligence officer for the Union Army during the American Civil War. He was a driving force behind the creation of the Gettysburg National Cemetery following the Battle of Gettysburg. He also led early efforts to preserve the Gettysburg Battlefield for future generations.

== Early life ==
McConaughy was the grandson of Irish immigrants who had settled in Chester, Pennsylvania, in 1712. The McConaughy family was among the first settlers of Adams County and among the most prominent pioneers. He was the youngest of six children of John and Margaret (Patterson) McConaughy. His father died when he was four years old, and David was raised by foster parents. He attended Gettysburg College from 1834 until 1838, when he transferred to Washington College, where his uncle, also named David McConaughy, a former Presbyterian minister in Gettysburg, was the president. After graduating in 1840, he accepted a position as principal of a high school in Maryland, where he remained two years.

McConaughy then studied law under noted abolitionist Thaddeus Stevens and became an attorney in Adams County. He was active in politics as a Whig. He helped organize the Gettysburg chapter of the YMCA and often sponsored lectures to raise funds for the organization, which often used "McConaughy's Hall" as a meeting place. From 1853 until 1863, he served as president and chairman of the board of directors for the newly established Evergreen Cemetery, and oversaw the construction of its now famous brick gatehouse on Cemetery Hill. He joined the newly formed Republican Party, served as a delegate to the 1860 National Convention, and became an outspoken supporter of President Abraham Lincoln.

== Civil War ==
When the Civil War started in 1861, McConaughy formed and served as captain of the "Adams Rifles," a company of civilian scouts, primarily composed of his law clients. They were active in monitoring the region for signs of Confederate activity during several threatened incursions, including during the Maryland Campaign. McConaughy's scouts and spies were particularly active in late June 1863 during the early days of the Gettysburg campaign, when they shadowed oncoming enemy cavalry and, later, the main infantry columns. McConaughy gave this vital information to the local military commander, Maj. Granville O. Haller, who in turn relayed it to Maj. Gen. Darius N. Couch and Governor Andrew Curtin in Harrisburg. McConaughy stayed in Gettysburg during the Confederate occupation in early July, still rendering service to the Federal soldiers. Following the battle, Col. George H. Sharpe wrote a letter to McConaughy on behalf of Maj. Gen. George G. Meade, formally thanking him for the critical information on Confederate troop movements.

The year before the Battle of Gettysburg, McConaughy had envisioned a Soldiers' Cemetery as part of Evergreen Cemetery. At the time, only two Gettysburg men had been killed in combat, so there was not enough support from the community to fund the project. In the days after the battle, he ordered Elizabeth Thorn, wife of cemetery caretaker Peter Thorn (who was off serving in the army) to bury nearly one hundred soldiers' bodies in Evergreen Cemetery. Within six weeks, McConaughy initiated efforts to form a National Cemetery as a central resting place for the thousands of slain Union soldiers that had been buried at widely scattered graves throughout the Gettysburg region. Having already laid the groundwork for his concept by previously talking to the adjoining landowners, McConaughy acquired purchasing rights for the 17 acres (69,000 m^{2}) of land immediately north of Evergreen Cemetery. By doing so, McConaughy foiled rival lawyer David Wills's plans to purchase the land for the Commonwealth of Pennsylvania. He began buying lots on Cemetery Hill with his own money and asked veterans to contribute financially. The National Cemetery was dedicated November 19, 1863, in ceremonies that included Lincoln's Gettysburg Address. McConaughy soon left the presidency of the Evergreen Cemetery Association to help establish the Gettysburg Battlefield Memorial Association, serving as its first president for ten years. He served as an Elector for Lincoln in the 1864 presidential campaign.

== Postbellum career ==
After the war, McConaughy served as a member of the Pennsylvania State Senate for Adams and Franklin counties. He commissioned a famous painting of the Battle of Gettysburg by artist Peter F. Rothermel. In late August 1869, McConaughy organized a reunion of the soldiers who fought at Gettysburg to recount their experiences and locate specific historic sites on the battlefield.

McConaughy was buried in Evergreen Cemetery.
