= Gettysburg National Military Park =

Larger area encompassing the National Cemetery and Battlefield

Gettysburg National Military Park Gettysburg National Park (1893) Gettysburg Park
- IUCN category III (natural monument or feature)
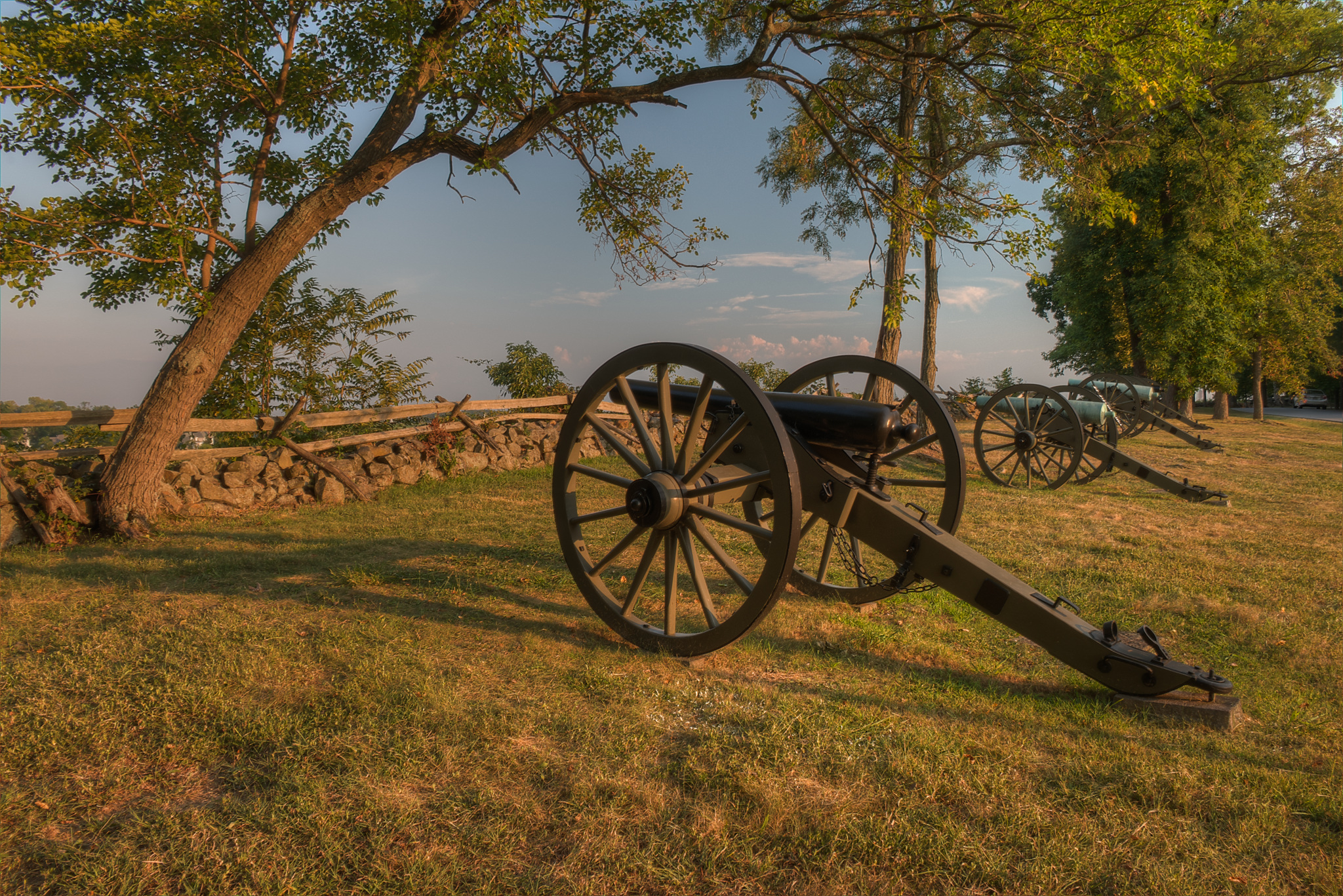
- Artillery on Seminary Ridge at Gettysburg National Military Park

- Location within Pennsylvania Location within the United States
- Nearest city: Gettysburg, Pennsylvania, U.S.
- Coordinates: 39°48′31″N 77°14′12″W
- Area: 6,032 acres (24.41 km^{2}) (as of 2020); 2009: 3,965 acres 1963: 2,871 acres 1932: 2,530 acres 1916: ~2,302 acres 1900: 1,221 acres 1888: 540 acres
- Established: 1966: added to NRHP; 1895: national park designation 1893: federal protection 1864: GBMA protection 1863: initial protection
- Visitors: 730,398 (in 2025)
- Governing body: 1933: National Park Service; 1896: War Department; 1864: Gettysburg Battlefield; Memorial Association
- Website: Gettysburg National Military Park

- Gettysburg National Military Park
- U.S. National Register of Historic Places
- U.S. Historic district
- Architects: Emmor Bradley Cope; William Saunders
- NRHP reference No.: 66000642
- Added to NRHP: October 15, 1966

Gettysburg National Military Park protects and interprets the landscape of the Battle of Gettysburg, fought over three days between July 1 and July 3, 1863, during the American Civil War. The park, in the Gettysburg, Pennsylvania, area, is managed by the National Park Service. Totaling 3,785 acres (1,532 ha) of area, it is mostly located in Cumberland Township, Adams County, Pennsylvania, where it takes up almost 20% of the municipality's area. Portions of the park extend into the Gettysburg borough limits, including the Soldiers' National Cemetery, and an exclave is in Mount Pleasant Township.

The park's properties include most of the Gettysburg Battlefield, many of the battle's support areas during the battle, including reserve, supply, and hospital locations, and several non-battle areas associated with the battle's aftermath and commemoration, including Gettysburg National Cemetery, where the Gettysburg Address was delivered by then president Abraham Lincoln on November 19, 1863. Many of the park's 43,000 American Civil War artifacts are displayed in the Gettysburg Museum and Visitor Center.

The park has more wooded land than in 1863, and the National Park Service has an ongoing program to restore portions of the battlefield to their historical non-wooded conditions, as well as to replant historic orchards and woodlots that are now missing. In addition, the NPS is restoring native plants to meadows and edges of roads, to encourage habitat as well as provide for historic landscape. There are also considerably more roads and facilities for the benefit of tourists visiting the battlefield park.

Attendance in 2018 was 950,000, a decline of 86% since 1970. The five major Civil War battlefield parks operated by the National Park Service (Gettysburg, Antietam, Shiloh, Chickamauga/Chattanooga and Vicksburg) had a combined 3.1 million visitors in 2018, down 70% from 10.2 million in 1970.

The park was added to the National Register of Historic Places on October 15, 1966.

== Federal land acquisition ==
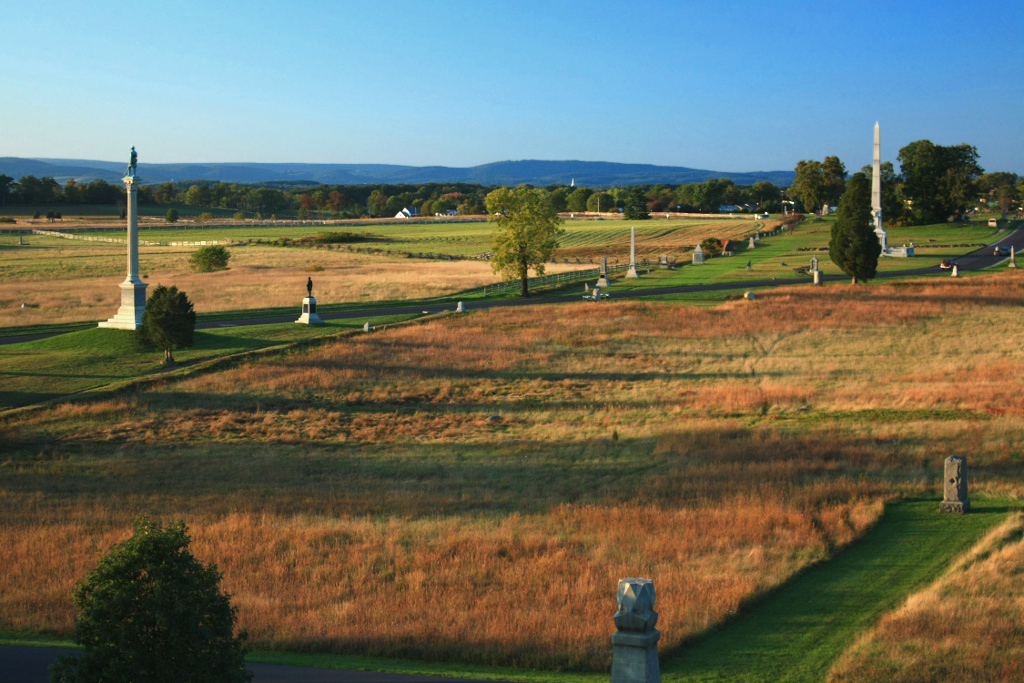
The battlefield and monuments visible from the park's Pennsylvania Memorial

The battlefield from Ziegler's Grove Tower looking south. April 1933.

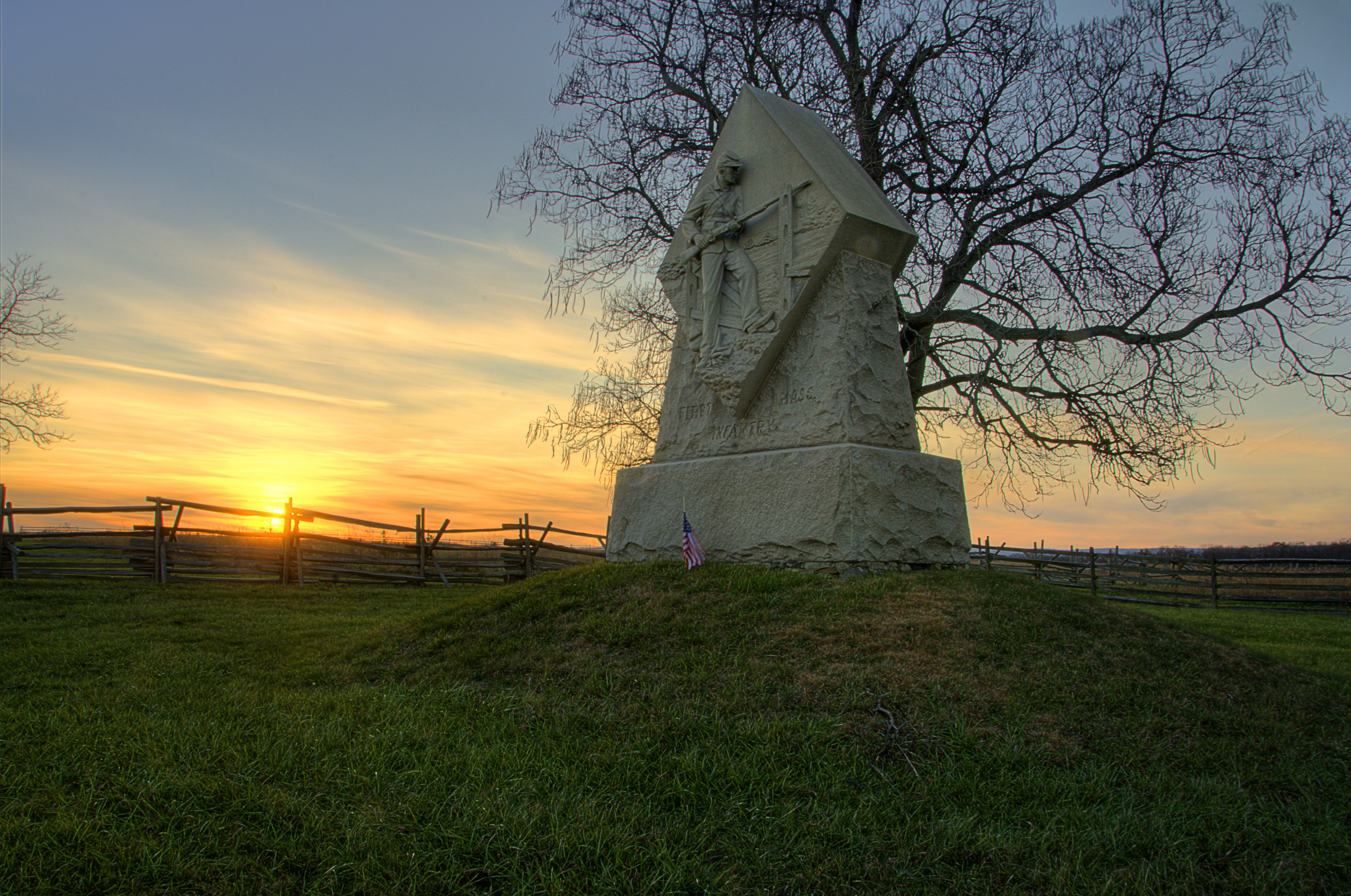
1st Massachusetts Monument at sunset

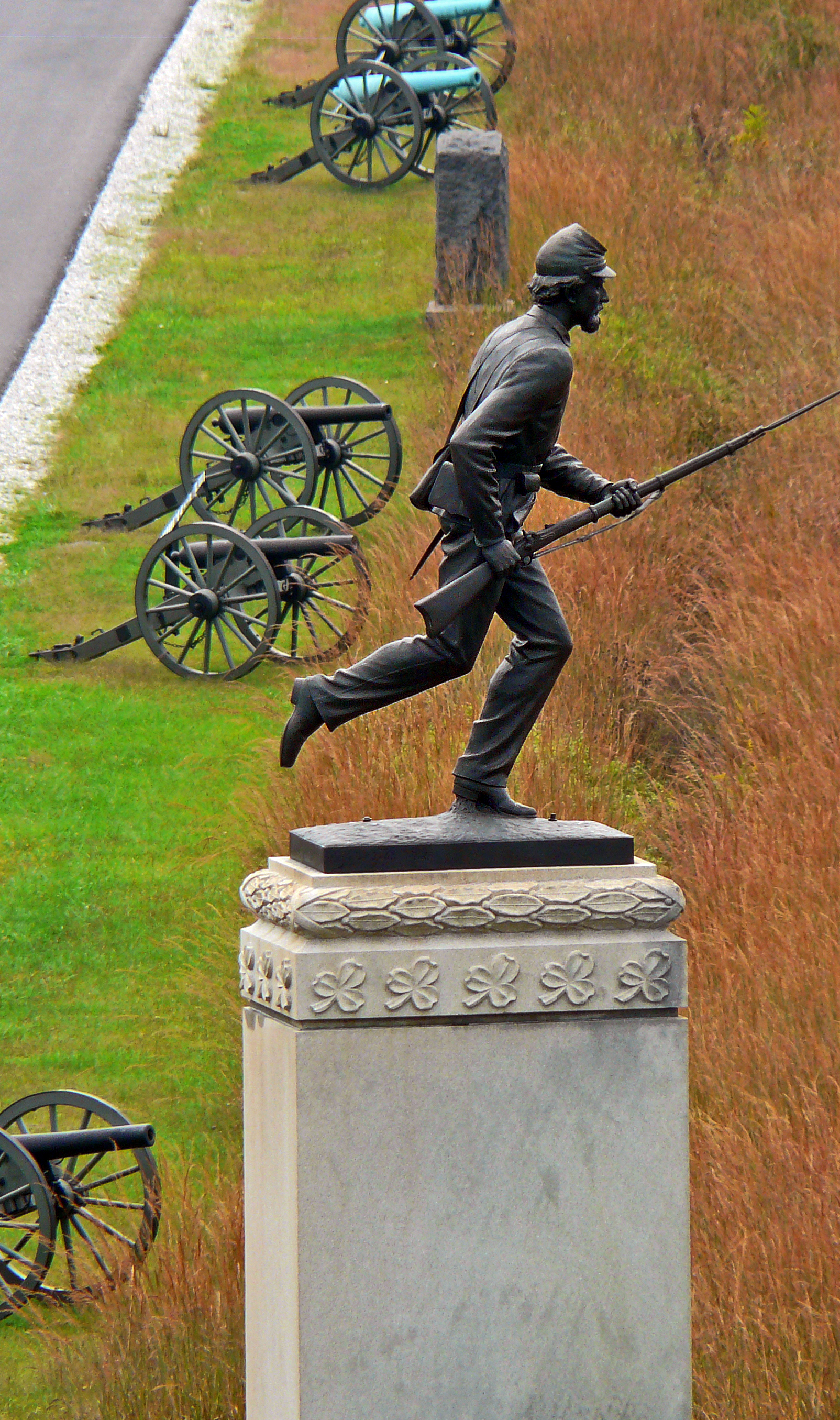
1st Minnesota Monument at the park's Cemetery Ridge

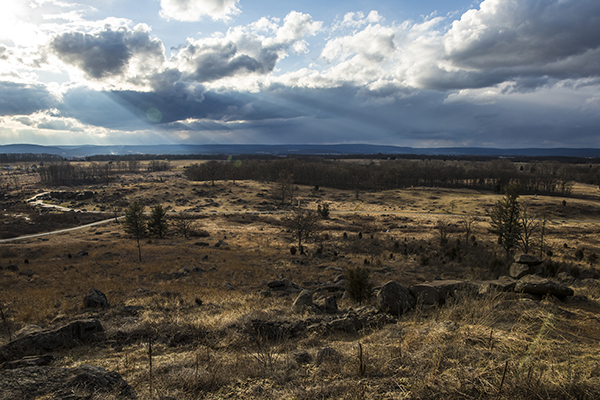
View From Little Round Top 2013

The 1864 Gettysburg Battlefield Memorial Association and later veteran's associations acquired land for memorials and preservation (e.g., the 72nd Pennsylvania Infantry Monument tract with the statuary memorial depicted on the 2011 America the Beautiful Quarter dollar). Federal acquisition of land that would become the 1895 national park began on June 7, 1893, with nine monument tracts of 625 sq ft (58.1 m^{2}) each and a larger 10th lot of 1.2 acres (4,900 m^{2}) from the Association, as well as 0.275 acres (1,110 m^{2}) from Samuel M Bushman. In addition to land purchases, federal eminent domain takings include the Gettysburg Electric Railway right-of-ways in 1917 (cf. 1896 United States v. Gettysburg Electric Ry. Co.). Donated land included 160 acres from the 1959 Gettysburg Battlefield Preservation Association and 264 acres (107 ha) from the W. Alton Jones Foundation. The Gettysburg Foundation is a 501(c)(3) non-profit philanthropic, educational organization that operates in partnership with the National Park Service to preserve Gettysburg National Military Park and the Eisenhower National Historic Site, and to educate the public about their significance. The Foundation raised funds for and built the new Museum and Visitor Center, opened in 2008, and secured funds for the creation of a new cannon shop that daily preserves the nearly 400 cannons representing actual artillery lines on the battlefield. In addition, the Gettysburg Foundation has provided approximately $20 million in direct support of the National Park Service just since 2009. The Visitor Center houses the Gettysburg Museum of the American Civil War and the 19th century, painting in the round, the Gettysburg Cyclorama.

The park officially came under federal control on February 11, 1895, with a piece of legislation titled, "An Act To establish a national military park at Gettysburg, Pennsylvania". This piece of legislation officially allowed the transfer of the deed for the park to go from the Gettysburg Battlefield Memorial National Park Association, to the Secretary of War.

In February 2009, The David Wills House where Lincoln completed his Gettysburg Address was added to the national park and is operated by Gettysburg Foundation. In 2010, an effort to expand the amount of the federally-owned GNMP land failed in Congress.

== Memorials and remembrance ==
The Park has been a highly symbolic venue for memorials and remembrance. On November 19, 1963, a parade and ceremony was held in Gettysburg commemorating the centennial of President Lincoln's Gettysburg Address, given less than five months after the Battle of Gettysburg. The actor, Raymond Massey, playing the role of President Lincoln, arrived by 1860s period steam train at the Gettysburg station. He rode, in the parade as did Lincoln, on horseback to the national cemetery where actor Massey gave the president's famous address (this time for brevity, Edward Everett's preceding two-hour speech was not read). The parade followed the same route that President Lincoln and Gov. Andrew G. Curtin took 100 years before. Former President Dwight D. Eisenhower—who lived nearby—was there, accompanied by Gov. William W. Scranton. The attendance at the 1963 commemoration was lower than the 20,000 to 30,000 persons who attended the original address by President Lincoln in 1863. Thousands of photographers attended the 1963 event while U.S. Air Force aircraft passed overhead. Also attending the event were the 28th Division of the Pennsylvania National Guard headed by Maj. Gen. Henry F. Fluck, the U.S. Marine Band, and the 3rd Infantry Regiment (The Old Guard) of the U.S. Army. The parade ended at the rear entrance into Gettysburg National Cemetery. It was not until the installation of a monument to General Lee in 1917 that Confederate memorials were included, which first took the form of individual monuments symbolizing a specific Confederate state.

== Administrative history ==
Gettysburg National Military Park is administered in the North Atlantic–Appalachian region, also known as the Northeast region.

Former and current Superintendents of Gettysburg National Military Park.

- John P. Nicholson: 1895–1922
- Colonel Emmor B. Cope: 1922–1927
- James B. Aumen: 1927–1927
- Colonel E. E. Davis: 1927–1932
- J. Frank Barber: 1932–1933
- James R. McConaghie: 1933–1941
- J. Walter Coleman: 1941–1958
- James B. Myers: 1958–1963
- Kittridge A. Wing: 1963–1966
- George F. Emery: 1966–1970
- Jerry L. Schober: 1970–1974
- John R. Earnst: 1974–1988
- Daniel Kuehn: 1988 (Sept)-1989 (Sept)
- Jose Cisneros: 1990 (Feb)-1994
- John Latschar: 1994 (Aug)–2009
- Brion Fitzgerald: 2009–2010
- Robert Kirby: 2010–2014
- Zach Bolitho: 2014-2014
- Ed Clark: 2014–2017
- Charles E. "Chuck" Hunt: 2017–2018
- Chris Stein: 2018–2018
- Lewis H. Rogers Jr: 2018–2018
- Ed Wenschhof Jr: 2018–2019
- Kristina Heister: 2019–2019
- Zach Bolitho: 2019-2019
- Steven D. Sims: 2019–Present

== Ecological challenges ==
Gettysburg National Military Park has run into ecological changes caused by its popularity and also natural causes. Natural areas like wooded areas, thickets and wetlands, have been stressed by pollution caused by traffic, and invasive species threatening the ecology of the park.

Vandalism at Gettysburg National Military Park is also a challenge to the integrity of the premises. The National Park Service released a statement on August 21, 2024, that spray paint and graffiti caused damage to the War Department Observation Tower and a large rock. The park staff were able to clean and revive both objects to their original condition.
