= New York State Monument =

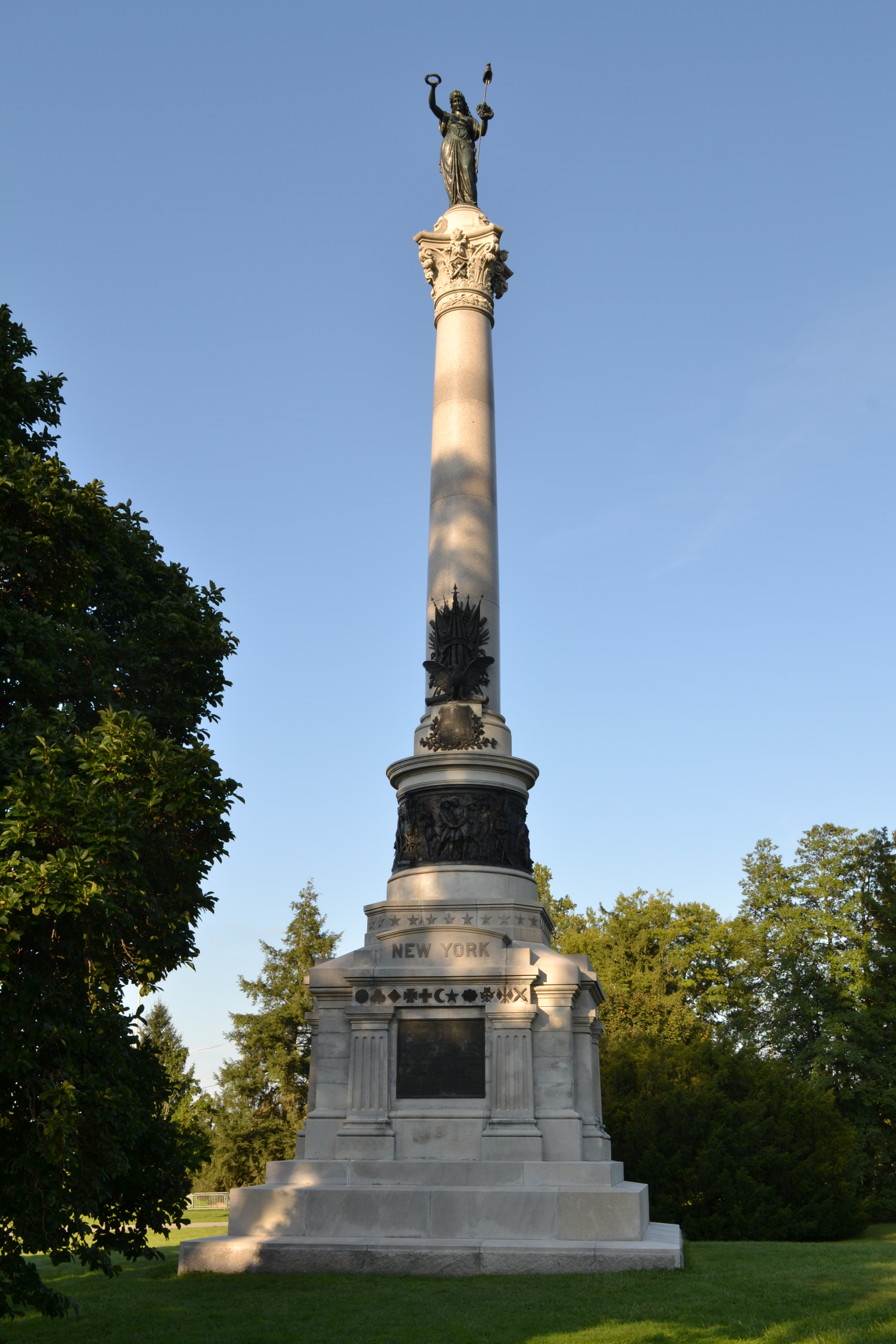
- The monument in 2018
- Interactive map of New York State Monument
- Location: Gettysburg National Cemetery, Gettysburg National Military Park, Pennsylvania, United States
- Coordinates: 39.820789°N 77.230596°W
- Designer: Caspar Buberl; Maurice J. Power (Some bronze works)
- Fabricator: Hallowell Granite Works; Henry-Bonnard Bronze Company
- Material: Bronze; Granite
- Length: 27.5 feet (8.4 m) (Base)
- Width: 27.5 feet (8.4 m) (Base)
- Height: 93 feet (28 m)
- Dedicated date: July 2, 1893
- Dedicated to: New York soldiers who died at the Battle of Gettysburg

The New York State Monument is a large monument at the Gettysburg National Cemetery in Pennsylvania. The granite and marble monument was dedicated in 1893 honors the soldiers from New York who died at the Battle of Gettysburg during the American Civil War. It was commissioned by the New York Monuments Commission and designed by sculptor Caspar Buberl, with some additional bronze-works designed by Maurice J. Power.

== History ==
=== Background and creation ===
During the American Civil War, over 475,000 soldiers in the Union Army were from the state of New York, more than any other state. Many New York soldiers participated in the Battle of Gettysburg, and New York constitutes the largest state group in the Gettysburg National Cemetery. Following the war, the state erected many monuments and memorials honoring their soldiers who died in the battle. In the late 1800s, the government of New York appropriated US$50,000 for the erection of a large monument in the cemetery. The New York Monuments Commission, headed by former Union General Daniel Sickles, solicited designs from several prominent sculptors, offering $500 for the winning design and $300 and $200 for the second and third place entries, respectively. Sculptor Caspar Buberl, who was well-known at the time for his military monuments, was selected to design the monument. Construction on the monument was underway by 1891. The stonework was executed by the Hallowell Granite Works, while the Henry-Bonnard Bronze Company cast the bronze-works. New York City-based sculptor Maurice J. Power was contracted to design some of the bronze pieces on the monument. H. A. Zabriskie, an assistant to General Sickles, served as the directing engineer for the overall project. The monument was dedicated on July 2, 1893. (Note: One source gives the date as July 3.) According to the New York Monuments Commission, the total cost for the monument was $59,095.30. (Note: One source gives the cost as $59,095.03.)

=== Later history ===
In 1995, the monument was surveyed as part of the Save Outdoor Sculpture! project. In mid-2011, the statue at the top of the monument was repaired and cleaned, and in June of the following year, the monument underwent steam-cleaning and a coating of protective wax was added to the bronze pieces.

== Design ==
The monument is primarily in the form of a victory column, modeled after Trajan's Column, topped by a bronze statue. The total height of the structure is approximately 93 feet (28 m). (Note: One source gives the height as 96 feet (29 m).) It is one of the tallest monuments at the site, even exceeding the height of the Soldiers' National Monument. The statue at the top is of a woman, resembling one of the women found in the Coat of arms of New York, holding flowers for the dead in one hand and a staff in the other. She stands approximately 13 feet (4.0 m) tall and faces towards the New York section of the National Cemetery.

"NEW YORK" is inscribed on the front of the monument's base, while a bronze plaque affixed to the front bears the following inscription: "TO THE OFFICERS AND SOLDIERS / OF THE / STATE OF NEW YORK / WHO FELL IN THE / BATTLE OF GETTYSBURG JULY 1,2,3, 1863 / MANY OF WHOM ARE HERE BURIED. / THIS MONUMENT IS / ERECTED BY A GRATEFUL COMMONWEALTH", in addition to a listing of casualties. A plaque on the rear of the base bears the names of officers from the state who died at Gettysburg. A number of Corps Badges are also present on the base. In total, this base, made of Hallowell granite, measures approximately 27 feet 8 inches (8.43 m) tall. Each side of the base measures roughly 27.5 feet (8.4 m). Above the base, wrapped around the start of the column is a ring of bronze tablets that depict four scenes from the battle: the wounding of General Daniel Sickles, the wounding of General Winfield Scott Hancock, the death of General John F. Reynolds, and a war council convened by General Henry Warner Slocum. This bronze drum measures 9 feet 9 inches (2.97 m) tall and has a diameter of 5 feet 3 inches (1.60 m). Above this bronze imagery is another bronze ornament, composed of the seal of New York, battle flags, and an eagle. The column, which issculpted from Fox Island granite, rises approximately 33 feet (10 m) tall and is made up of four sections.

=== Gallery ===
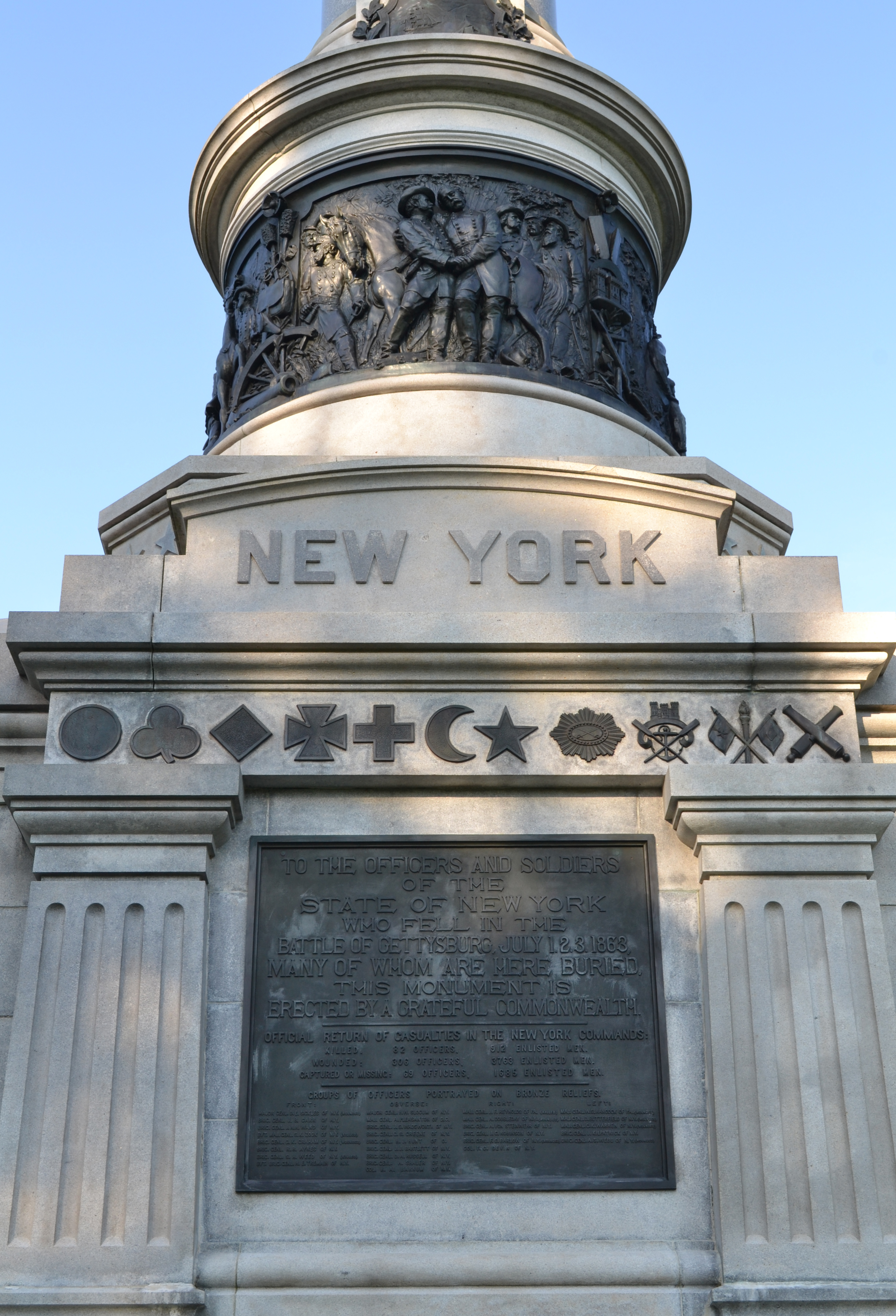
Front of the base

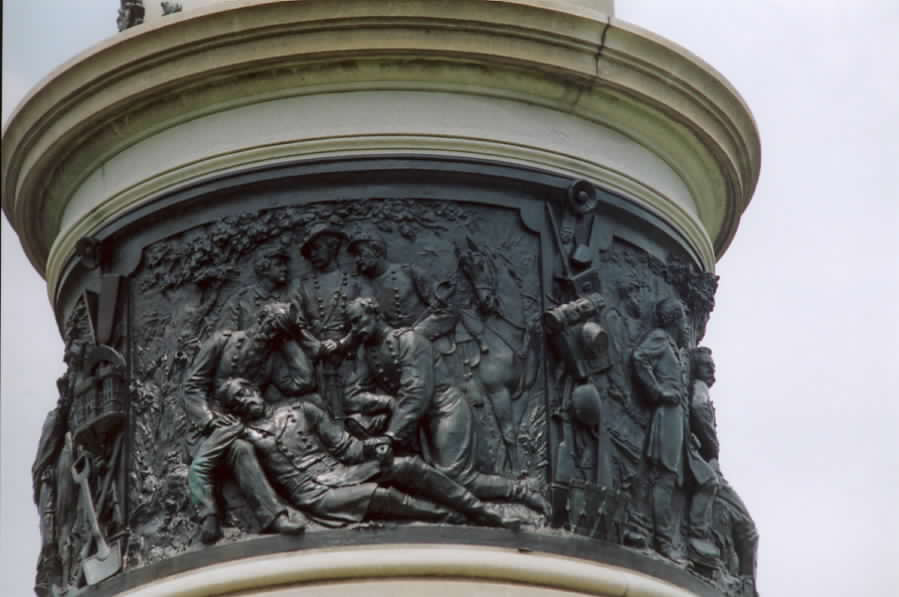
Bronze drum

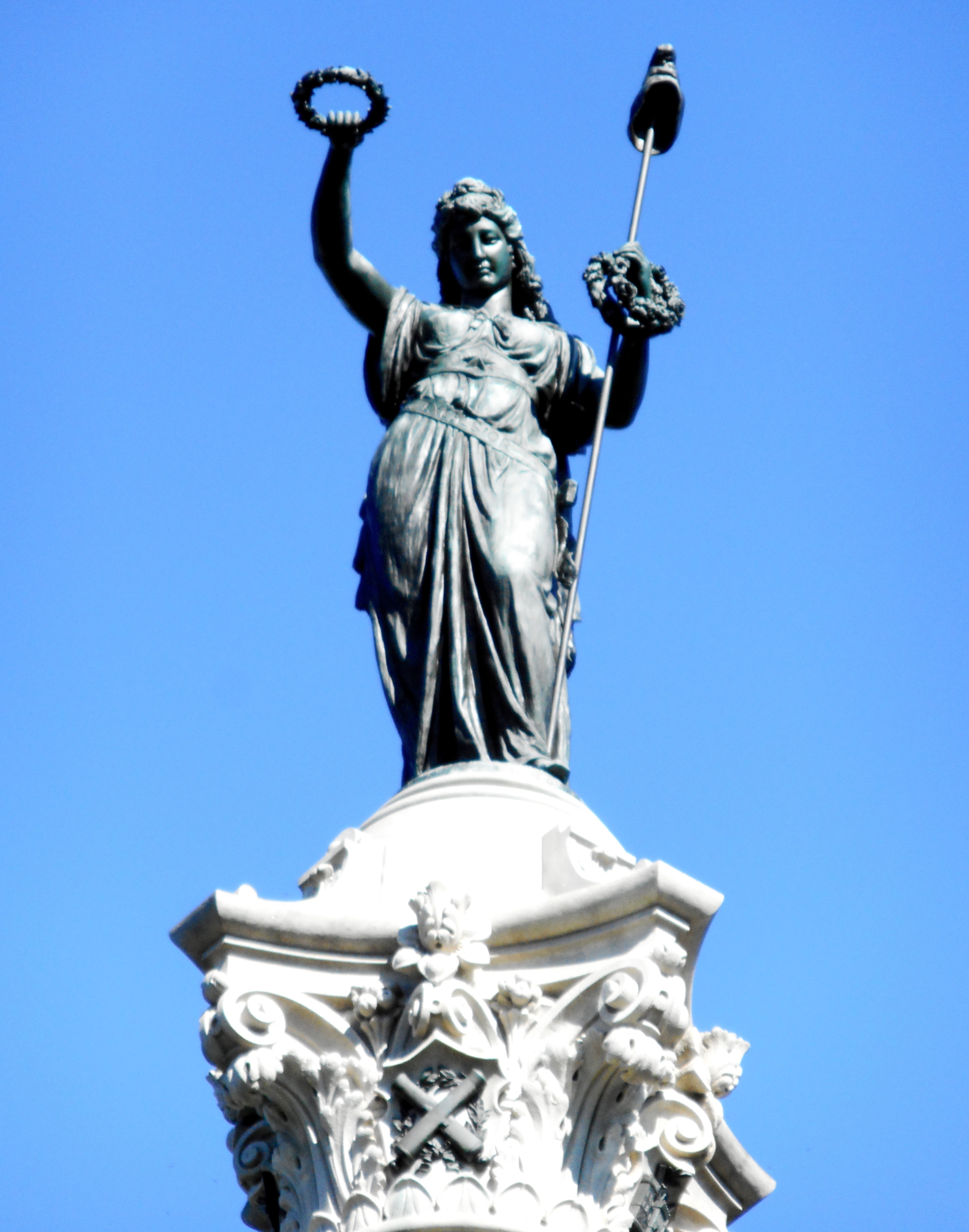
Statue

== See also ==
- List of monuments of the Gettysburg Battlefield
- New York in the American Civil War

== Sources ==
- "The New York State Monument at Gettysburg". Frank Leslie's Illustrated Newspaper. LXXII (1853). New York City: 112. March 21, 1891.
- Gettysburg Battlefield Monuments: The Embodiment of One of America's Most Memorable Battles. Gettysburg, Pennsylvania: Americana Souvenirs and Gifts. 1999. ISBN 978-1-890541-06-4.
- Guide to Gettysburg Battlefield Monuments. Monument Descriptions by Tom Huntington (1st ed.). Mechanicsburg, Pennsylvania: Stackpole Books. 2013. ISBN 978-0-8117-1233-0.
- Lawhon, Katie (May 14, 2012). "Three of Gettysburg's Tallest Monuments to be Washed and Polished in June". National Park Service.
- Final Report on the Battlefield of Gettysburg. Vol. III. New York Monuments Commission for the Battlefields of Gettysburg and Chattanooga. Albany, New York: J.B. Lyon Company. 1900.
- "New York State Monument, (sculpture)". Smithsonian Institution Research Information System.
