= Rostrum =

Rostrum may refer to:

- Any kind of a platform for a speaker:
  - dais
  - pulpit
  - podium
- Rostrum (anatomy), a beak, or anatomical structure resembling a beak, as in the mouthparts of many sucking insects
  - Rostrum of corpus callosum, a commissural fiber in the brain
- Rostrum, a Naval ram, a ship-weapon on ancient oared warships
- Rostrum Records, an American record label
- Australian Rostrum, an association of public speaking clubs
- International Rostrum of Composers
- Gettysburg Rostrum, Gettysburg Battlefield venue for historical commemorations
- Rostrum camera, to animate a still picture or object
- Rostrum Peak, a mountain summit of the Rockies in British Columbia

== See also ==
- Rastrum, a musical writing implement used to draw staff lines
- Rostra, a large platform built in the ancient city of Rome
- Rostral (disambiguation)
