= Henry H. Bingham =

American politician (1841–1912)

Henry Harrison Bingham
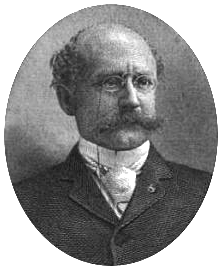

Dean of the United States House of Representatives
- In office March 6, 1900 – March 22, 1912
- Preceded by: Alfred C. Harmer
- Succeeded by: John Dalzell

Member of the U.S. House of Representatives from Pennsylvania's 1st district
- In office March 4, 1879 – March 22, 1912
- Preceded by: Chapman Freeman
- Succeeded by: William Scott Vare

Personal details
- Born: December 4, 1841 Philadelphia, Pennsylvania, U.S.
- Died: March 22, 1912 (aged 70) Philadelphia, Pennsylvania, U.S.
- Resting place: Laurel Hill Cemetery, Philadelphia, Pennsylvania, U.S.
- Education: Washington and Jefferson College (LLD)
- Awards: Medal of Honor

Military service
- Allegiance: United States; Union
- Branch/service: United States Army; Union army
- Years of service: 1862–1866
- Rank: Major; Brevet Brigadier General
- Unit: 140th Regiment Pennsylvania Volunteer Infantry
- Battles/wars: American Civil War; Battle of Gettysburg; Battle of the Wilderness; Battle of Spotsylvania; Battle of Fair Oaks & Darbytown Road

Henry Harrison Bingham (December 4, 1841 – March 22, 1912) was an American politician from Pennsylvania who served as a Republican member of the U.S. House of Representatives for Pennsylvania's 1st congressional district from 1879 to 1912. He was a Union army officer in the American Civil War, fought in some of the key battles of the war and received the United States Military's highest award for valor, the Medal of Honor, for his actions at the Battle of the Wilderness.

== Early life ==
Bingham was born in Philadelphia, Pennsylvania on December 4, 1841. He graduated from Jefferson College in Canonsburg, Pennsylvania, in 1862, where he became a member of the Phi Kappa Psi fraternity. He received a LLD degree in 1902 from Washington and Jefferson College in Washington, Pennsylvania.

== U.S. Civil War service ==
Bingham enlisted in the Union army and received a commission as a first lieutenant in the 140th Pennsylvania Volunteer Infantry on August 22, 1862.

During the Battle of Gettysburg on July 1–3, 1863, he was serving as captain and Judge-Advocate on the staff of Major General Winfield Scott Hancock's II Corps. During the battle he witnessed Pickett's Charge, and was near The Angle where the Confederates reached the high-water mark. He received the personal effects from the wounded Confederate Brigadier General Lewis Armistead and carried the news to General Hancock, Armistead's friend from before the war. Bingham was a Mason (Chartiers Lodge #297, Canonsburg, PA), and the story of how he provided assistance to the dying fellow Mason, General Armistead, was used in Masonic literature, and commemorated with the Friend to Friend Masonic Memorial at Gettysburg National Cemetery. On the other hand, recent scholarship in 2010 by Michael Halleran shows that while Armistead and Bingham were both Masons, Bingham's encounter with Armistead occurred while the mortally wounded Armistead was being carried from the field by several men and happened purely by chance not because of any appeal of Masonic significance. Bingham never claimed otherwise. Bingham did take Armistead's personal effects and forwarded them to Major General Winfield S. Hancock as Armistead had requested because Hancock was a pre-war friend. Bingham also was wounded on July 3, 1863 at the Battle of Gettysburg.

In 1864, Bingham became aide-de-camp to Major General Gouverneur K. Warren. During the Battle of the Wilderness during the Virginia Overland Campaign, on May 6, 1864, as captain of Company G, 140th Pennsylvania Infantry, he "rallied and led into action a portion of the troops who had given way under fierce assaults of the enemy." He was awarded a Medal of Honor on August 26, 1893, for these actions.

Bingham was wounded again at the Battle of Spotsylvania, May 12, 1864. On September 25, 1864, Bingham was discharged from his company for promotion and appointed Major and Judge Advocate of the First Division. Bingham was captured at Dabney's Mill, Virginia on October 27, 1864 during the Battle of Fair Oaks & Darbytown Road but escaped the same day.

Bingham was wounded a third time during his service at Farmville, Virginia in 1865.

Bingham was mustered out of the service on July 2, 1866 and returned home to Philadelphia. On December 3, 1867, President Andrew Johnson nominated Bingham for appointment to the brevet grade of brigadier general of volunteers, to rank from April 9, 1865, and the U.S. Senate confirmed the appointment on February 14, 1868.

== Career ==
Henry Bingham was appointed postmaster of Philadelphia by President Andrew Johnson in March 1867 and served until December 1872, when he resigned to accept the clerkship of the courts of oyer and terminer and quarter sessions of the peace in Philadelphia. He was a delegate to the Republican National Conventions of 1872 though 1900. He was elected to Congress as a Republican in 1878, and served until his death. In Congress, he served as Chairman of the Committee on the Post Office and Post Roads, and on the Committee on Expenditures in the Post Office Department.

He died in Pennsylvania March 22, 1912 and is buried in Laurel Hill Cemetery Philadelphia, Pennsylvania.

== Honors and awards ==
=== Medal of Honor citation ===
Rank and organization: Captain, Company G, 140th Pennsylvania Infantry. Place and date: At Wilderness, Va., May 6, 1864. Entered service at: Cannonsburg, Pa. Born: December 4, 1841, Philadelphia, Pa. Date of issue: August 31, 1893.

Citation: Rallied and led into action a portion of the troops who had given way under the fierce assaults of the enemy.

=== Other honors ===
Bingham County, Idaho was named in his honor.

== See also ==
- List of Medal of Honor recipients
- List of American Civil War Medal of Honor recipients: A–F
- List of American Civil War brevet generals (Union)
- List of members of the United States Congress who died in office (1900–1949)

== Notes ==
U.S. House of Representatives
| Preceded by Chapman Freeman | Member of the U.S. House of Representatives from Pennsylvania's 1st congressional district 1879–1912 | Succeeded by William S. Vare |
