= Memorialization =

Process of preserving memories of people or events

Memorialization (also spelt memorialisation) is the process of preserving memories, especially the collective memory, of people or events. It can be a form of a memorial, and address or petition, or a ceremony of remembrance or commemoration.

== Memorialisation and transitional justice ==
In the context of transitional justice, memorialisation honours the victims of human rights abuses. Memorials can help governments reconcile tensions with victims by demonstrating respect and acknowledging the past. They can also help to establish a record of history, and to prevent the recurrence of abuse.

Memorials can also be serious social and political forces in democracy-building efforts.

Memorials are also a form of reparations, or compensation efforts that seek to address past human rights violations. They aim to provide compensation for losses endured by victims of abuse, and remedy prior wrongdoing. They also publicly recognize that victims are entitled to redress and respect. The United Nations Basic Principles on the Right to a Remedy and Reparation recognizes “commemorations and tributes to the victims” as a form of reparation.

There are numerous types of memorials used as transitional justice initiatives. These include architectural memorials, museums, and other commemorative events. For instance, in northern Uganda, monuments, annual prayer ceremonies, and a mass grave were created in response to the war conducted by and against the Lord’s Resistance Army there.

Another example is the Museum of Memory and Human Rights in Chile, which was created to document abuses by the former military dictatorship there.

== Challenges of memorialization ==
Memorialization can arouse controversy and present certain risks. In unstable political situations, memorials may increase desire for revenge and catalyze further violence. They are highly politicized processes that represent the will of those in power. They are thus difficult to shape, and international relief workers, peacekeepers, and NGOs risk being drawn into disputes about the creation or maintenance of memorial sites. Yet they also have the potential to redress historical grievances and enable societies to progress.

Guy Beiner has introduced a concept of decommemorating in reference to hostility towards acts of commemoration that can result in violent assaults and in iconoclastic defacement or destruction of monuments. Beiner's studies suggest that rather than stamping out memorialization, decommemorating can paradoxically, function as a form of ambiguous remembrance, sustaining interest in controversial memorials. Destruction of monuments can also trigger renewed acts of memorialization (which Beiner labelled "re-commemorating").

== See also ==
- Cenotaph
- Commemorative coin
- Commemorative stamp
- Culture of Remembrance
- De-commemoration
- Moment of silence
- Mortuary roll
- Truth-seeking
- Transitional Justice
- Transitional Justice Institute
- Reparations (transitional justice)
- Holocaust Memorial Days
- Stolperstein 'Stumbling stone'
- Yom HaShoah (Holocaust and Heroism Remembrance Day) Israel
- National Day of Commemoration (Ireland)
- Commemoration of Husayn ibn Ali
- Khojaly Massacre Commemoration Day
- Commemorations of the Mountain Meadows massacre
- International Commemoration Day for Dead and Injured
- Gettysburg Rostrum (Battlefield venue for historical commemorations)
- Crime Victims' Rights Week Annual United States commemoration that promotes victims' rights and services.
- Maaveerar Day or Heroes' Day. Commemoration observed by Tamil people to remember the deaths of militants.
- Sacred Defence Week Iranian annual commemoration of the 1980-1988 Iran-Iraq war.
- Bataan Memorial Death March Annual commemoration of the Bataan Death March.
