= Remembrance Day at the Gettysburg Battlefield =

Annual event in Pennsylvania, US

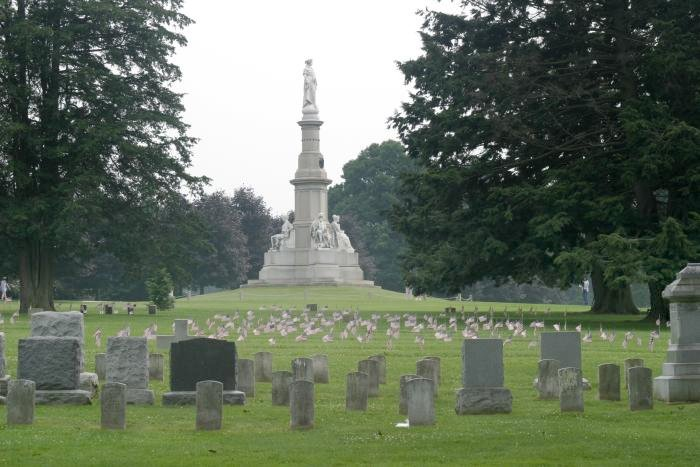
Soldiers National Monument at the center of Gettysburg National Cemetery

Remembrance Day is an annual Gettysburg Battlefield event for the anniversary of the 1863 Consecration of the National Cemetery at Gettysburg during which President Abraham Lincoln delivered the Gettysburg Address. Starting in 1868, the ceremonies and Memorial Day address at Gettysburg National Park became nationally known.

Because the cemetery dedication at Gettysburg occurred on November 19, that day (or the closest weekend) has been designated as Remembrance Day. Initially coordinated the Grand Army of the Republic, Remembrance Day is held on a weekend. and the Consecration anniversary was resolved "Dedication Day" by the U.S. Congress in 1949.

== Associated events ==
A number of affiliated events are held in conjunction with Remembrance Day, including a costume ball the prior Friday evening, a "Remembrance Illumination" of Gettysburg National Cemetery graves, a fundraiser at the Gettysburg Cyclorama, a Citizenship Ceremony, and other events promote tourism to Gettysburg, Pennsylvania.

== Reunion in 1913 ==
In July 1913, veterans of the United States and Confederate armies gathered in Gettysburg to commemorate the fifty-year anniversary of the Battle of Gettysburg.
