= Lewis R. Stegman =

American politician

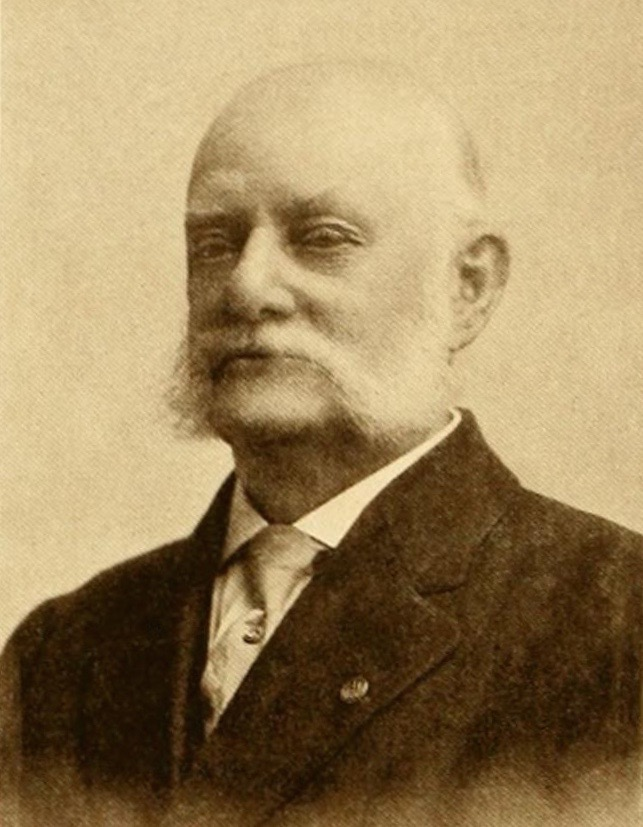
- Stegman circa 1900

Sheriff of Kings County, New York
- In office 1881–1884

Personal details
- Born: January 18, 1839 Brooklyn, New York
- Died: October 7, 1923 (aged 84) Brooklyn, New York
- Party: Republican
- Parent(s): Andrew Stegman; Meta Margaretha Rust

Lewis R. Stegman (January 18, 1839 – October 7, 1923), was a Union officer in the American Civil War. He later served as Sheriff of Kings County, New York.

== Biography ==
Lewis R. Stegman was born January 18, 1839, in Brooklyn, New York, to Andrew Stegman and Meta Margaretha Rust, both German immigrants. Stegman was educated in public schools and attended Marpe's Academy before studying law. Excessive studying, however, had an adverse effect on Stegman's health and he thus pursued work as a surveyor to allow himself more time outdoors. By 1861, he had returned to practicing law.

With the outbreak of the Civil War, Stegman enlisted in the Van Buren Light Infantry. Like many young men then joining the army, he hoped to secure an officer's commission by recruiting men for the regiment. He was tireless in this endeavor, enlisting his own brother Andrew, as well as men from New Jersey and even as far away as Vermont to fill the ranks of what later became Company E, 102nd New York Volunteer Infantry. After enlisting the requisite number of men, Stegman was elected captain.

The 102nd New York left its camp in East New York in March 1862, after a long period of organization. Much of the following spring was spent in camp around Washington. While Stonewall Jackson terrorized Federal troops the Shenandoah Valley, Stegman and his comrades guarded the various routes that supplied the Union Army. During this time, he was reportedly engaged in reconnaissance duty, no doubt due to his surveying experience.

Stegman was wounded in the regiment's first battle on August 9, 1862, the Battle of Cedar Mountain. As the leftmost unit during the Union advance on the southern portion of the battlefield, the 102nd New York was exposed to Confederate artillery fire. A shell exploded near Stegman and a fragment struck him in the head. Nevertheless, Stegman refused to sit out the Battle of Antietam the following month and went into action with a bandage on his head. He remained in command of Company E throughout the rest of 1862 and into 1863, leading it in the battles of Chancellorsville and Gettysburg. In the latter engagement, Stegman took command of the regiment when Col. James C. Lane was wounded.

Following Gettysburg, Col. Lane recovered from his Gettysburg wound and returned to command of the regiment. Also, at around this time Capt. Gilbert M. Elliott, once a lieutenant under Stegman, was promoted to the rank of major. The reasons for Elliott's promotion over his former company commander are unclear, but they perhaps stem from previous incidents in which Stegman was charged with "conduct prejudicial to military order and discipline." Stegman, on the other hand, had little respect for Col. Lane, whom he considered unfit for command. However, other officers outside the regiment must have trusted his judgment; during this period, Stegman was appointed judge advocate on his division's court martial.

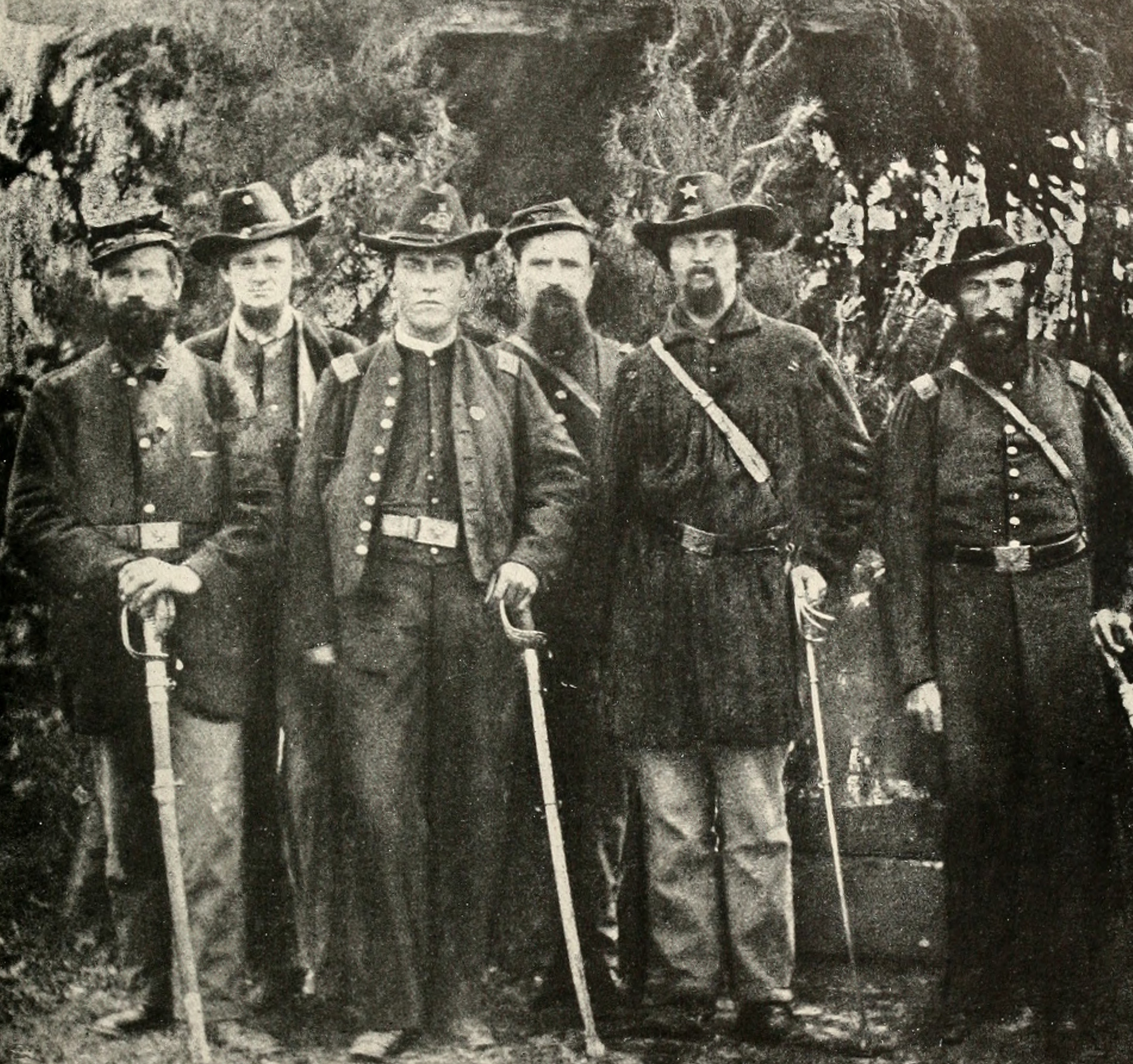
Stegman, second from left, with the other officers of the court martial, Second Division, Twelfth Corps, during the summer of 1863.

That autumn, the 102nd New York, along with the rest of the Union XII Corps was sent west to relieve the siege of Chattanooga. On November 24, 1863, Stegman led his company during the successful assault on Lookout Mountain. Three days later, at the Battle of Ringgold Gap, he distinguished himself by leading 40 men to prevent the Confederates from burning a bridge as the enemy retreated.

During the winter of 1863-1864, XI Corps and XII Corps were combined to form XX Corps, which was incorporated into the Union Army of the Cumberland. During this period of reorganization, Stegman was promoted to major and was de facto second in command of the 102nd New York during the subsequent Atlanta Campaign. He participated in the battles at Resaca and New Hope Church in May 1864. On June 14, 1864, after a long bout of illness, Col. Lane resigned for medical reasons, and Stegman took command of the regiment. The following afternoon, he led it in a charge against strong Confederate earthworks at Pine Knob (also called Pine Mountain or Gilgal Church), where the regiment was caught in a crossfire and subsequently pinned down. On the morning of June 16, 1864, Stegman was shot through the thigh while commanding the skirmish line.

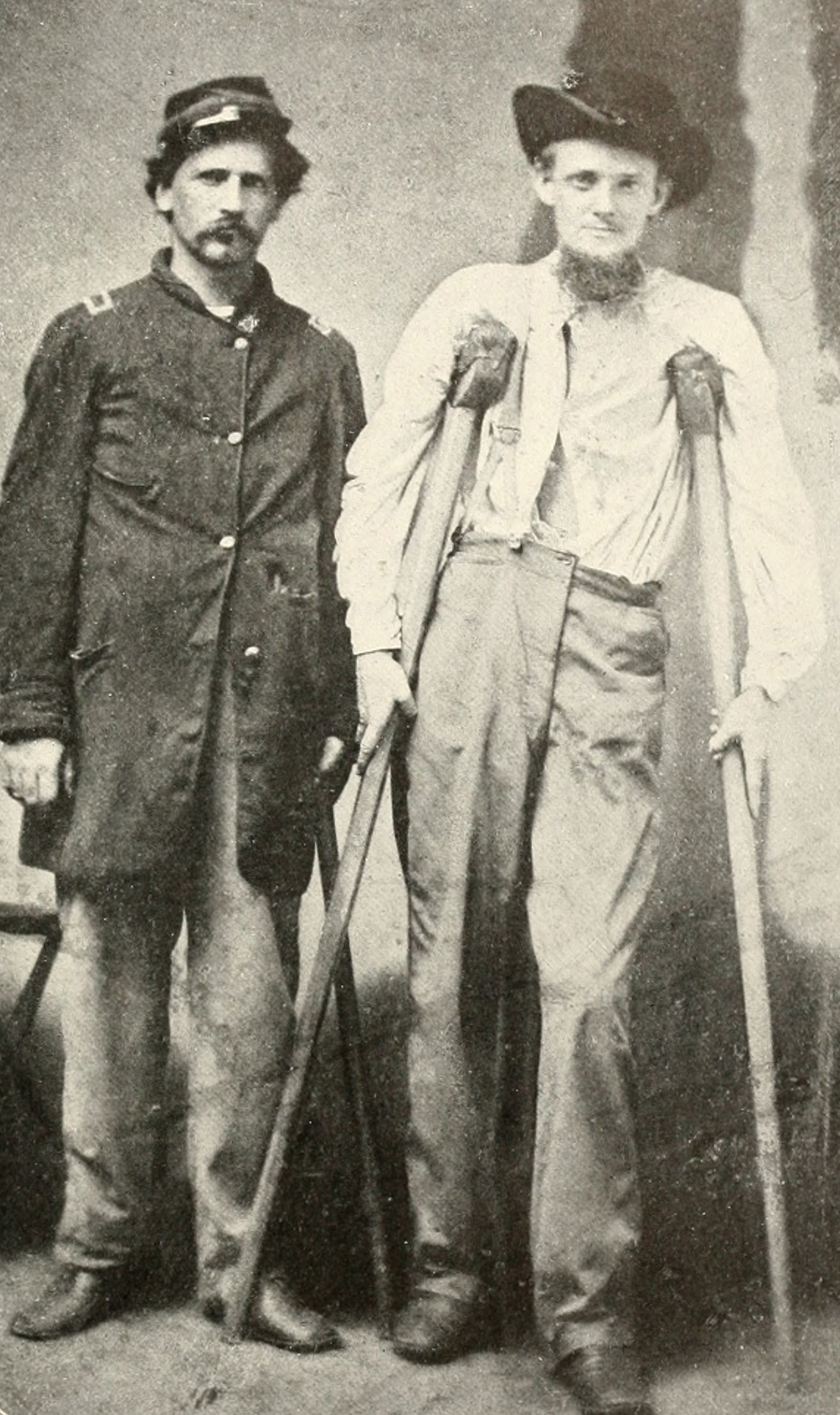
Lieutenant Donner of Ohio (left) and Maj. Lewis R. Stegman, 102nd New York (right), both wounded in the thigh, the latter at Pine Knob, Georgia, June 16, 1864.

His wound at Pine Knob forced Stegman to resign from the 102nd New York. In October 1864, he became major of the 1st United States Veteran Volunteers serving in the Shenandoah Valley and Loudoun County, Virginia, but saw no major action. After the war concluded in 1865, he applied for a commission in the regular army but was denied. Like many veteran officers, Stegman received brevet promotions for gallantry and went home a colonel of U.S. Volunteers.

After the Civil War, Stegman returned to New York and made his home in Brooklyn, where he worked in various professions, most often as a journalist. In 1876, he became under-Sheriff of Kings County, New York, thus beginning a career in public service that included serving in the New York State Assembly (Kings Co., 6th D.) in 1879 and as Sheriff of Kings County beginning in 1881. His election as Sheriff was noteworthy as he was elected as a Republican in a largely Democratic district. In 1886, he was indicted for stealing from an estate.

During his final years, Stegman was a prominent member of the New York Monuments Commission, working to commemorate the sacrifices of New York soldiers during the Civil War. He wrote numerous historical essays and biographies during this period, and he was a featured speaker at many veterans' events, including monument dedications at Gettysburg and Antietam. Stegman became chairman of the commission in 1912 after a financial scandal ousted chairman Daniel E. Sickles.

Lewis R. Stegman died on October 7, 1923, in Brooklyn, New York. He was buried in Cedar Grove Cemetery, in Flushing, New York.

New York State Assembly
Preceded by Jacob Worth	New York State Assembly; Kings County, 6th District; 1879	Succeeded by Patrick J. Tully
