= Chapman Freeman =

American politician

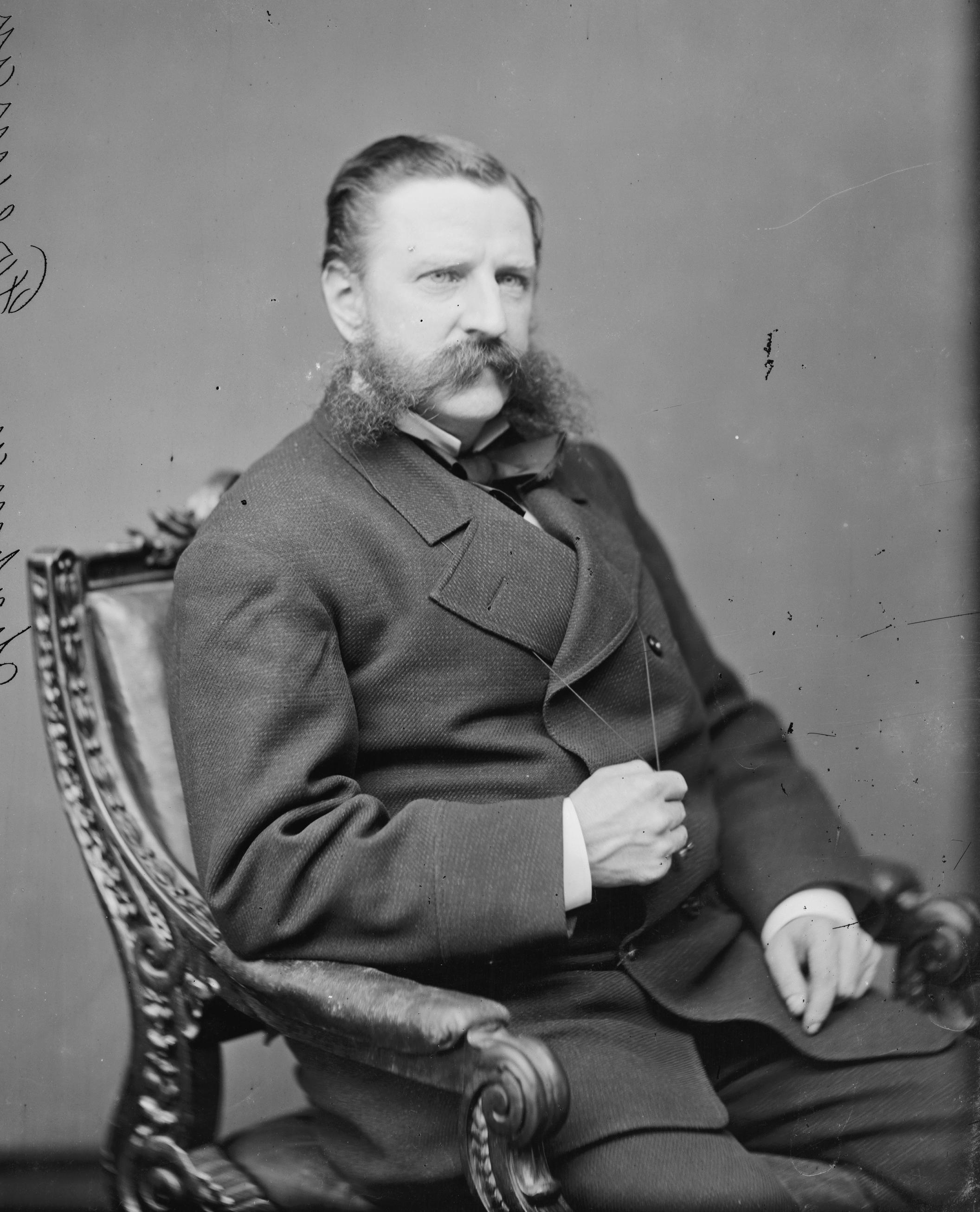

Member of the U.S. House of Representatives from Pennsylvania's 1st district
- In office March 4, 1875 – March 3, 1879
- Preceded by: Samuel J. Randall
- Succeeded by: Henry H. Bingham

Personal details
- Born: Nathaniel Chapman Freeman; October 8, 1832 Philadelphia, Pennsylvania, U.S.
- Died: March 22, 1904 (aged 71) Strafford, Pennsylvania, U.S.
- Party: Republican

Chapman Freeman (October 8, 1832 – March 22, 1904) was a Republican member of the U.S. House of Representatives from Pennsylvania.

== Biography ==
Chapman Freeman was born in Philadelphia. In 1851, he graduated from Central High School as a "distinguished student" of the 26th session, giving a speech at the graduation ceremony, which was held at the Musical Fund Hall. He went on to study law, but engaged in mercantile pursuits until he entered the United States Navy as acting assistant paymaster in 1863.

In 1864, he resigned due to his impaired health, and subsequently resumed the study of law. He was then admitted to the bar in 1867 and, in 1873, became one of the commissioners of the Centennial in Vienna, Austria, during which time he represented the city of Philadelphia.

He was elected in 1874 as a Republican to the 44th Congress and served two terms. He declined to be a candidate for renomination in 1878.

U.S. House of Representatives
Preceded by Samuel J. Randall	Member of the U.S. House of Representatives from Pennsylvania's 1st congressional district 1875–1879	Succeeded by Henry H. Bingham
