= Friend to Friend Masonic Memorial =

- Interactive map of Friend to Friend Masonic Memorial
- Location: Gettysburg National Cemetery
- Coordinates: 39°49′15.5″N 77°13′54.5″W
- Designer: Ron Tunison
- Type: Historic structure
- Dedicated date: August 21, 1993

The Friend to Friend Masonic Memorial is a Gettysburg Battlefield monument depicting the "Armistead-Bingham incident" in which Union Army Captain Henry H. Bingham assisted wounded Confederate Brigadier General Lewis Addison Armistead. Both men were Freemasons. This event occurred shortly after Pickett's Charge on July 3, 1863. However, the memorial statue was not created until more than 130 years later, in 1993.

== History ==
=== July 3, 1863 ===
Armistead was wounded at the Battle of Gettysburg. His sword was captured by Union forces and later returned in 1906. Armistead entrusted his other personal effects, including his spurs, watch chain, seal and pocketbook to Union Army Captain Bingham. This occurred while he was en route to a Union field hospital on the Spangler Farm, where he would die two days later. During his journey Armistead briefly met Capt. Bingham, and after learning that he was on the staff of General Winfield Scott Hancock, who was a Freemason as well, he asked Bingham to pass along the items with a message to Hancock. General Hancock was a "valued friend" of Armistead's from before the war, and they served together in the Federal army. Hancock was also wounded at Gettysburg and he would not see Armistead before he died.

=== Later Accounts ===
In 1870, James Walker painted the 20 ft × 7.5 ft (6.1 m × 2.3 m) The Repulse of Longstreet's Assault at the Battle of Gettysburg where "Armistead, mortally wounded, is seated on the grass, and is in the act of giving his watch and spurs to his friend, Captain Bingham." As of 2023, the painting is located in Spartanburg, South Carolina.

In 1887, the Lewis A. Armistead marker was placed at the high water mark of the Confederacy, referring to an area on Cemetery Ridge near Gettysburg, Pennsylvania, marking the farthest point reached by Confederate forces during Pickett's Charge.

According to Masonic scholar Paul Bessel, it was said that "as he went down he gave a Masonic sign asking for assistance" although others believe this occurred after Armistead was carried from the battlefield.

== 1993 Memorial ==
The memorial was dedicated on August 21, 1993 and was commissioned by the Grand Lodge of Pennsylvania.

The sculpture depicts Bingham at the side of Armistead and has a plaque on the reverse with information regarding the dedication: "This monument is presented by the Right Worshipful Grand Lodge of Free and Accepted Masons of Pennsylvania and dedicated as a memorial to the Freemasons of the Union and the Confederacy. Their unique bonds of friendship enabled them to remain a brotherhood undivided, even as they fought in a divided nation, faithfully supporting the respective governments under which they lived."
