= Podium =

Platform used to raise something above its surroundings

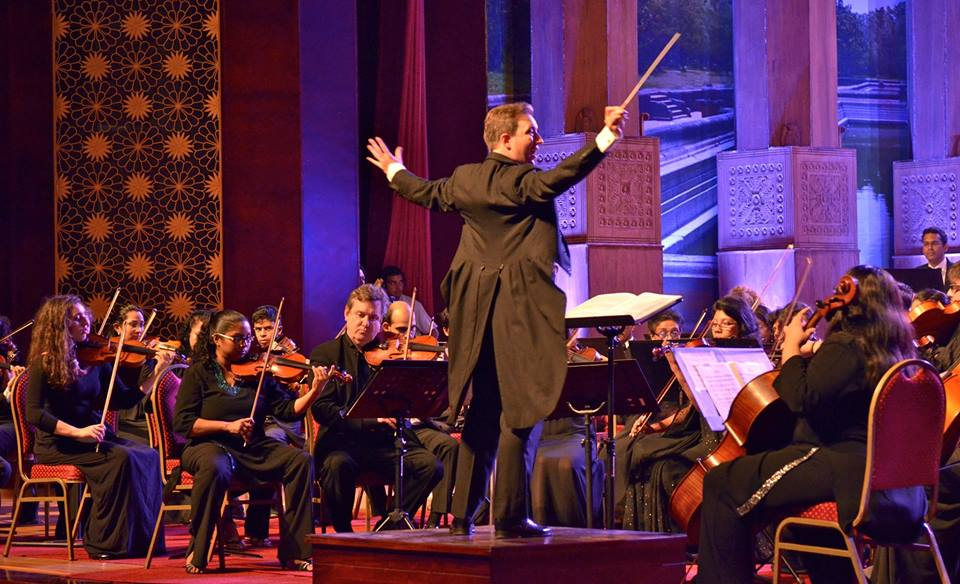
An orchestra conductor stands on a podium so he can both see and be seen by the musicians

A podium (pl.: podiums or podia) is a platform used to raise something to a short distance above its surroundings. In architecture a building can rest on a large podium. Podiums can also be used to raise people, for instance the conductor of an orchestra stands on a podium as do many public speakers. Common parlance has shown an increasing use of podium in North American English to describe a lectern.

In sports, a type of podium can be used to honor the top three competitors in events. In the modern Olympics a tri-level podium is used. Traditionally, the highest platform is in the center for the gold medalist. To their right is a lower platform for the silver medalist, and to the left of the gold medalist is a lower platform for the bronze medalist. At the 2016 Rio Summer Olympics, the Silver and Bronze podium places were of equal elevation. In many sports, results in the top three of a competition are often referred to as podiums or podium finishes. In some individual sports, podiums is an official statistic, referring to the number of top three results an athlete has achieved over the course of a season or career. The word may also be used, chiefly in the United States, as a verb, "to podium", meaning to attain a podium place.

== Etymology ==
The word podium derives from Latin, which in turn borrowed it from Ancient Greek πόδιον (podion), a word derived from πούς (pous, "foot", with a stem pod-).

== Use at modern Olympics ==
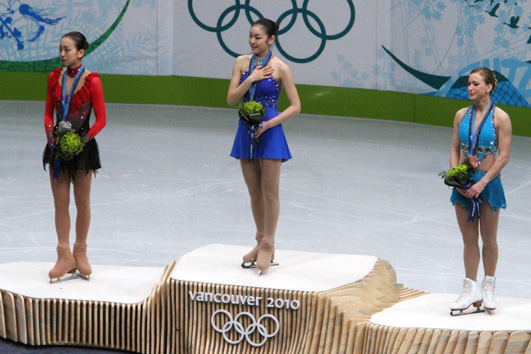
A podium at the 2010 Winter Olympics. The medallists of the ladies' single figure skating: Mao Asada (left, silver), Yuna Kim (center, gold), Joannie Rochette (right, bronze).

Podiums were first used at the 1930 British Empire Games (now Commonwealth Games) in Hamilton, Ontario and subsequently during the 1932 Winter Olympics in Lake Placid and the 1932 Summer Olympics in Los Angeles.

Podiuming has become a slang term for finishing a contest within the first three places. The use of the word podium as a verb instead of noun is controversial. The New York Times wrote on the very subject of the correct use of the word podium during its Winter Olympic coverage in 2010.

== In motorsport ==
In many forms of motorsport, the three top-placed drivers in a race stand on a podium for the trophy ceremony. The winner stands in the middle, with the second placed driver to their right and the third place driver to their left. Also present are the dignitaries selected by the race organisers who will present the trophies.

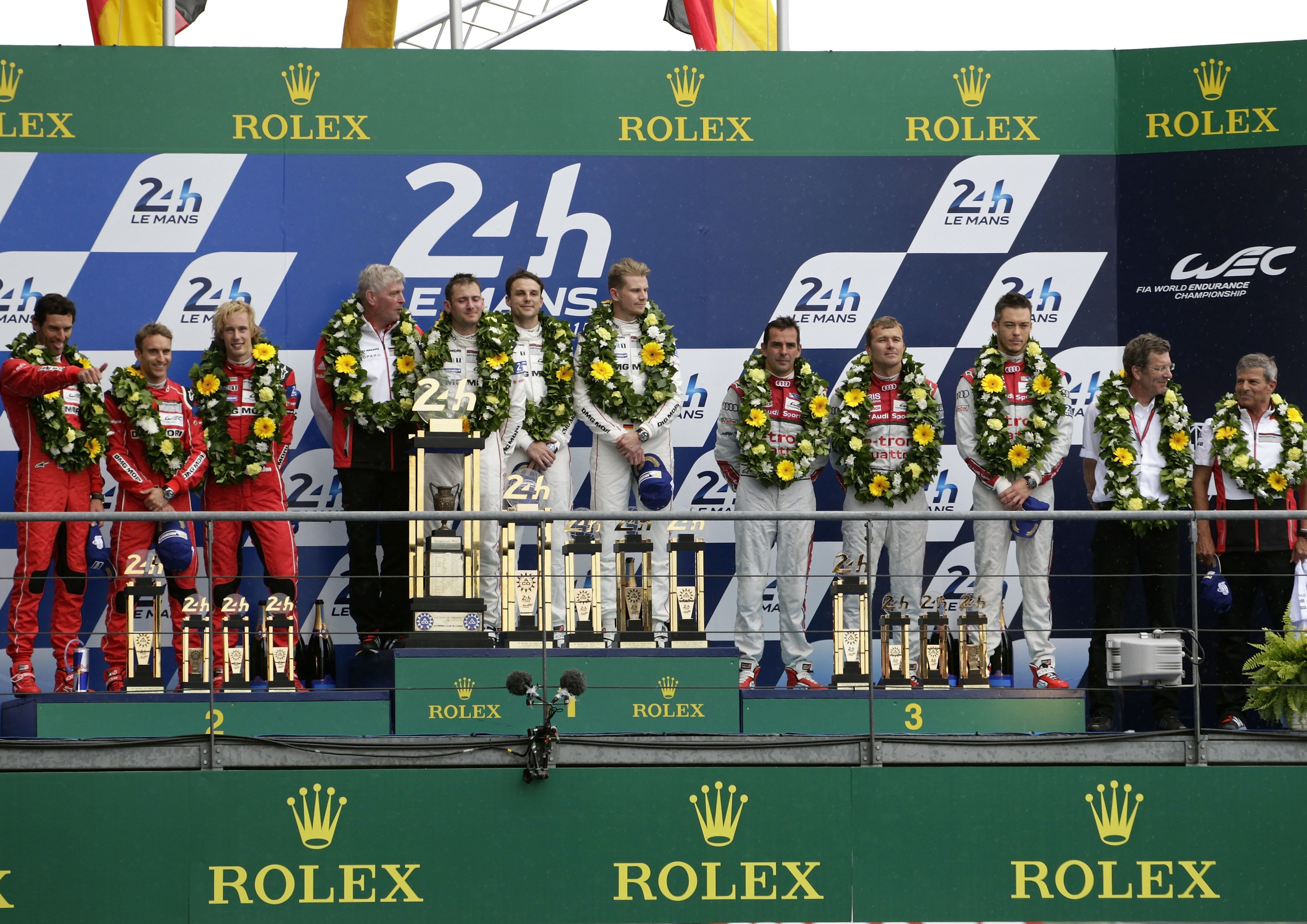
Le Mans winners' podium, 2015

In some motorsport events, including Formula One, a representative of the team that won the race will also be present at the podium, with a fourth podium step, trophy and champagne. In some series, drivers are provided with a baseball cap with the logo of the series' tyre provider to wear while on the podium. In an international series, the national anthem of the winning driver, and the winning team or constructor may be played over a public address system and the flags of the drivers' countries are hoisted above them. The recordings are short versions of the national anthems, ensuring the podium ceremony stays within its allocated time. Should a driver experience problems with his car on a slow lap in Formula One, that driver is transported to the pit lane via road car by the Formula One Administration security officer.

Following the presentation of the trophies, the drivers will often spray Champagne over each other and their team members watching below, a tradition started by Dan Gurney following the 1967 24 Hours of Le Mans race. The drivers will generally refrain from spraying champagne if a fatality or major accident occurs during the event. Also, in countries where alcohol sponsorship or drinking is prohibited, alcoholic beverages may be replaced by other drinks, for example rose water.

The term has become common parlance in the media, where a driver may be said to "be heading for a podium finish" or "just missing out on a podium" when he is heading for, or just misses out on a top three finish. The NASCAR Cup Series, the highest level of stock car racing in the United States, does not use a podium in post-game events or statistics. Instead, the winning team celebrates in victory lane, and top-five and top-ten finishes are recognized statistically. Those finishing second to fifth are required to stop in a media bullpen located on pit lane for interviews. The INDYCAR NTT IndyCar Series does not use a podium at either the Indianapolis 500 or at Texas Motor Speedway. The Indy 500 has a long tradition of the winning driver and team celebrating in victory lane, while Texas Motor Speedway president Eddie Gossage has stated that victory lane should be reserved for the winner of the race. The series uses a podium at all other races, particularly road course events.

== In architecture ==
Architectural podiums consist of a projecting base or pedestal at ground level, and they have been used since ancient times. Originally sometimes only meters tall, architectural podiums have become more prominent in buildings over time, as illustrated in the gallery.

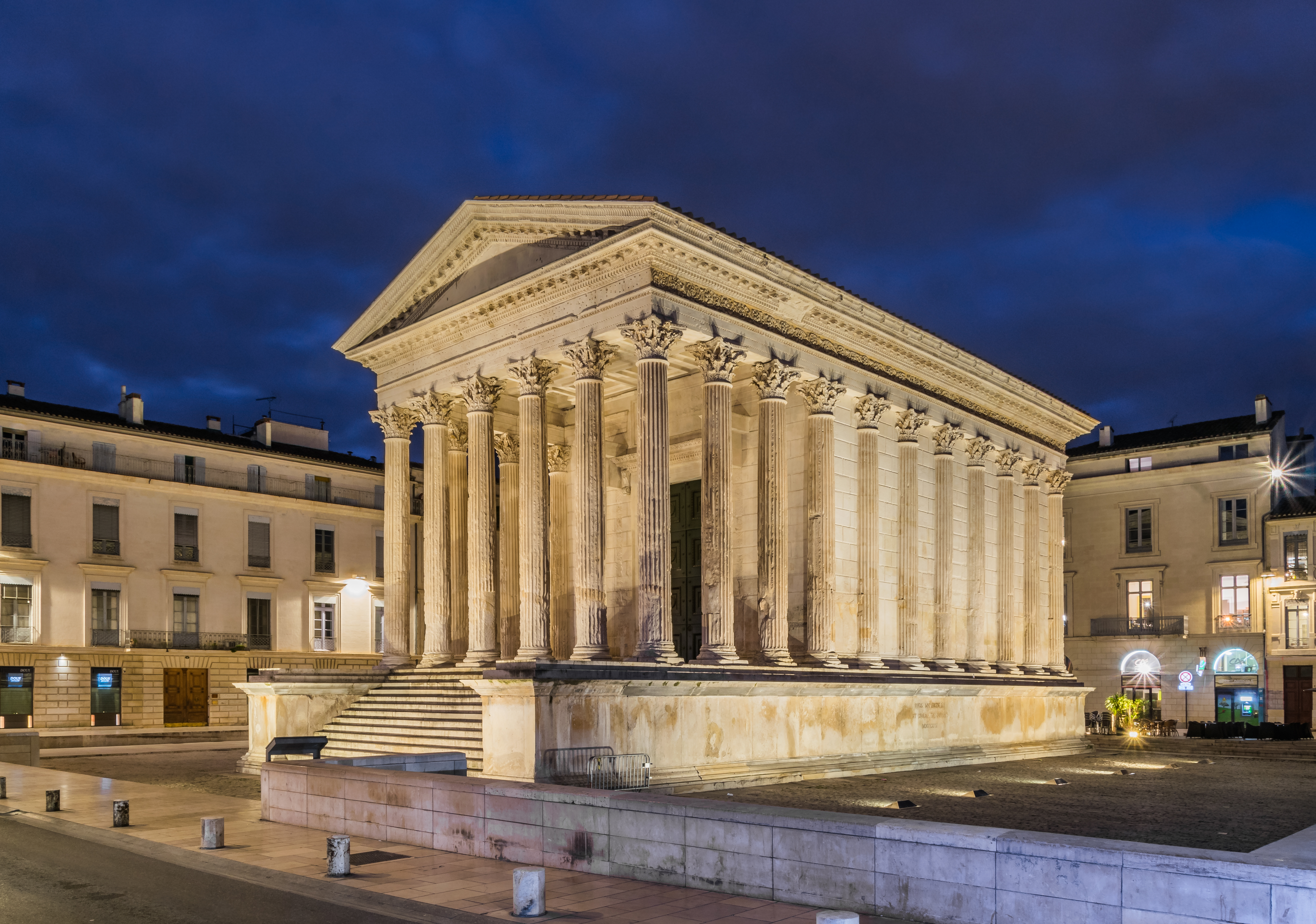
Maison Carrée, a Roman temple (4–7 AD)

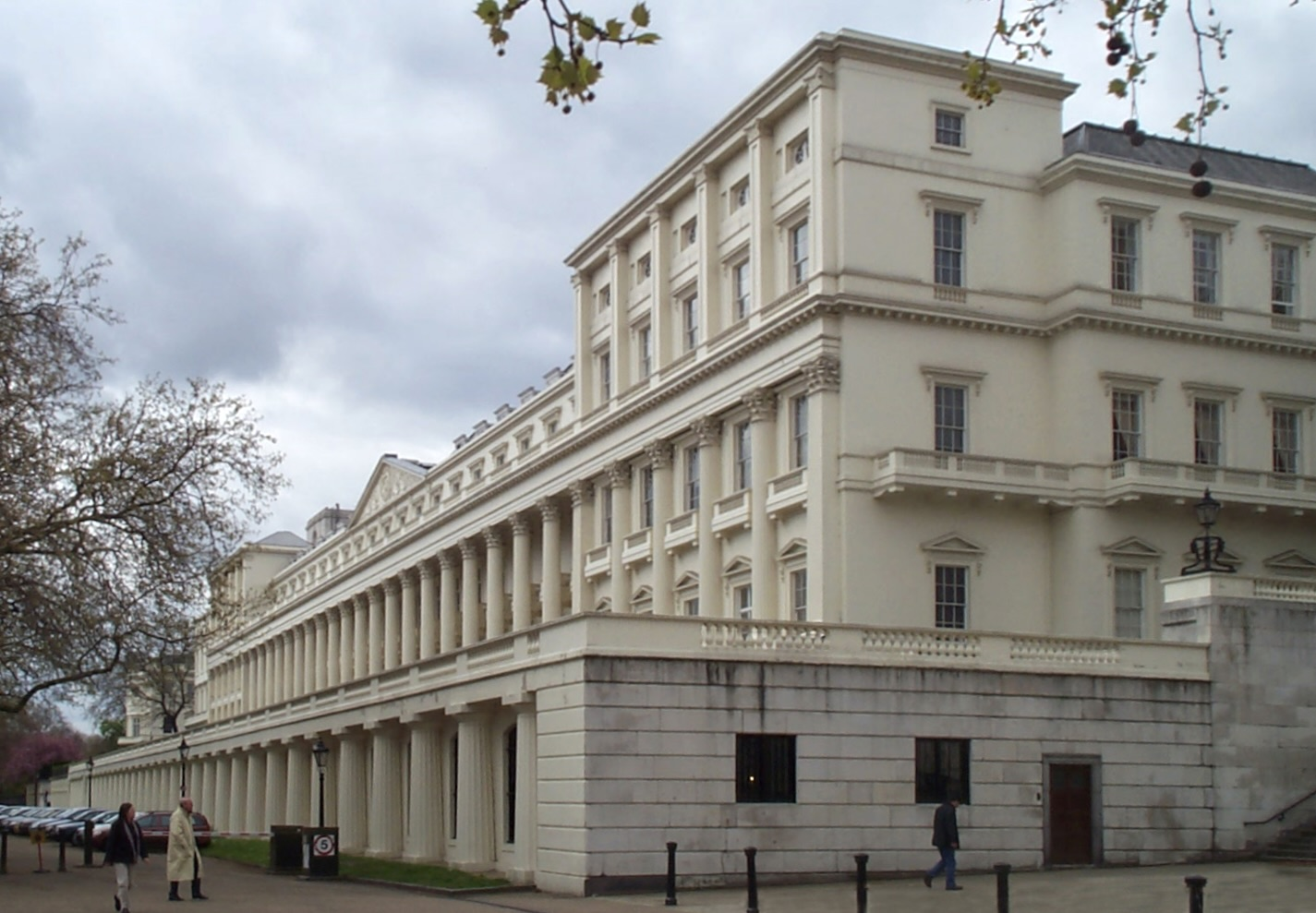
London terrace housing (18th century)

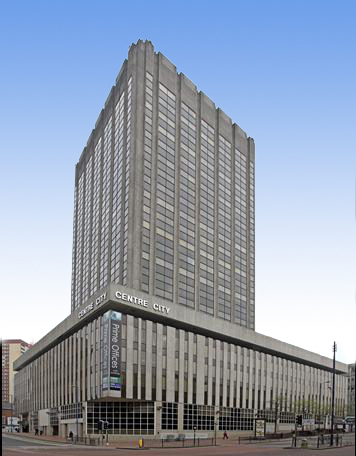
Centre City Tower, Birmingham (1975)

== See also ==
- Dais
- Lectern
- Pedestal
- Pulpit
- Rostrum
- Soapbox
