= Rostral =

Rostral may refer to:

== Anatomy ==
- Rostral (anatomical term), situated toward the oral or nasal region
- Rostral bone, in fish and some tetrapods including ceratopsian dinosaurs
- Rostral organ, of certain fish
- Rostral scale, in snakes and scaled reptiles

== Other uses ==
- Rostral column, a victory column commemorating a naval military victory

== See also ==
- Rostrum (disambiguation)
