= Soldiers' National Monument =

Memorial in Gettysburg, Pennsylvania, US

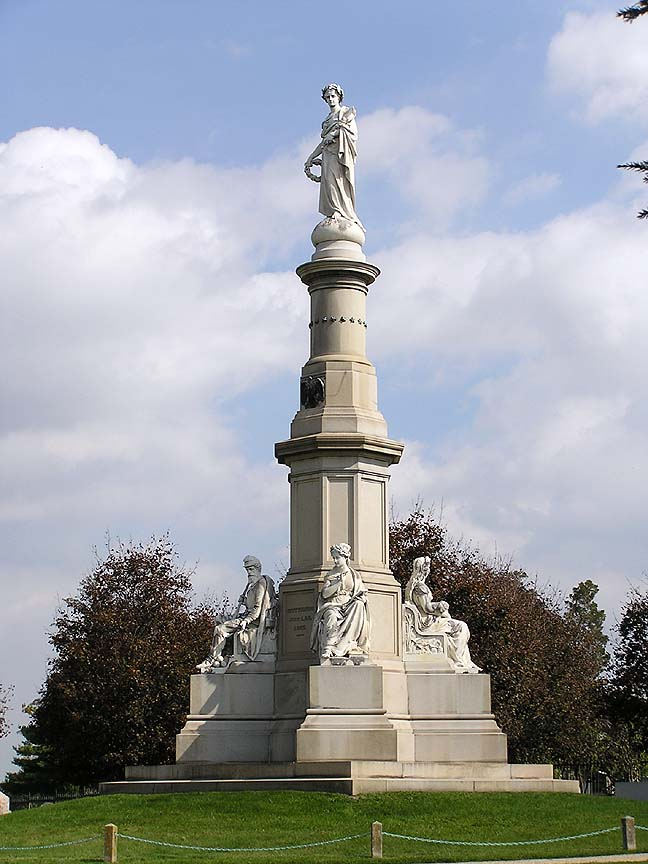
- Interactive map of Soldiers' National Monument
- Location: Gettysburg National Cemetery
- Coordinates: 39.819767°N 77.231217°W
- Designer: Randolph Rogers; George Keller (architect)
- Beginning date: July 4, 1865
- Dedicated date: July 1, 1869

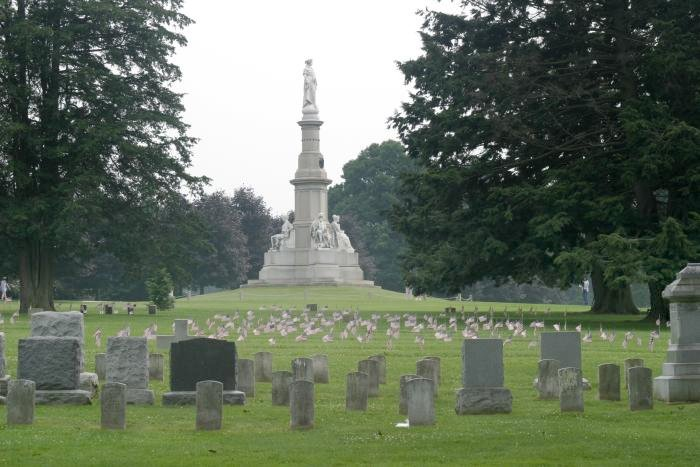
Southward view of monument at the center of the semicircle of Gettysburg graves of the Union's Army of the Potomac (midground) and beyond subsequent veteran graves (foreground) added to the cemetery.

The Soldiers' National Monument is a Gettysburg Battlefield memorial which is located at the central point of Gettysburg National Cemetery. It honors the battle's soldiers and tells an allegory of "peace and plenty under freedom … following a heroic struggle." In addition to an inscription with the last 4 lines of the Gettysburg Address, the shaft with 4 buttresses has 5 statues:

A large statue representing the concept of Liberty surmounts the pedestal. Eighteen large bronze stars circling the pedestal below this statue represent the eighteen Union states with buried dead. A statue is located at each corner near the base. They represent War, History, Peace, and Plenty. War is represented by a statue of an American soldier who recounts the story of the battle to History. In turn, History records, with stylus and tablet, the achievements of the battle and the names of the honored dead. A statue of an American mechanic and his tools illustrates Peace. Plenty is a female figure with a sheaf of wheat and the fruits of the earth that typify peace and abundance as the soldier's crowning triumph.

== History ==
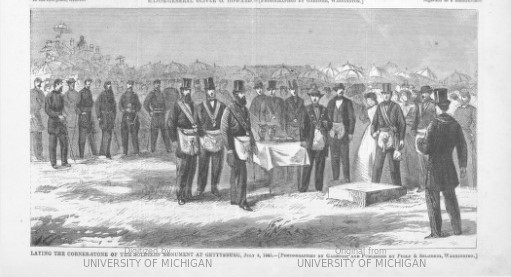
Masonic Conescecration of Solder Monument Gettysburg PA July 1865 (Made from Alexander Gardner Photograph Harper's Weekly July 22,1865 p.453)

Massachusetts approved appropriations to the Gettysburg Soldiers' National Monument Association on March 14, 1865; and in May, David Wills invited veterans organizations for the extensive July 4 cornerstone ceremony (lithographs of the "design proposed by J. G. Batterson" were available by July 19, 1865.) The monument structure was built at Batterson's works at Westerly, Rhode Island, and the Genius of Liberty grasping sword and laurel wreath was sculpted in Rome (arrived October 1868). The monument without the "Plenty" or "Peace" statues was dedicated in 1869 with the prayer by Rev. Henry Ward Beecher, followed by an address by Gen. George G. Meade, oration by Senator Oliver P. Morton, and poem by Bayard Taylor. The monument's "Plenty" statue was placed on August 26, 1869; and a record of the cornerstone and dedication ceremonies was published in 1874. Contrary to popular belief, the monument does not rest on the site of the oration of the Gettysburg Address (nor does the Gettysburg address monument, 300 yards to the south). Modern scholarship places the site of the speech about 40 yards east of the soldier's monument. When he gave the speech, at a spot that is now within the civilian cemetery, he was facing west, toward a flagpole that stood where the soldier's monument was later erected.

== Photo gallery ==
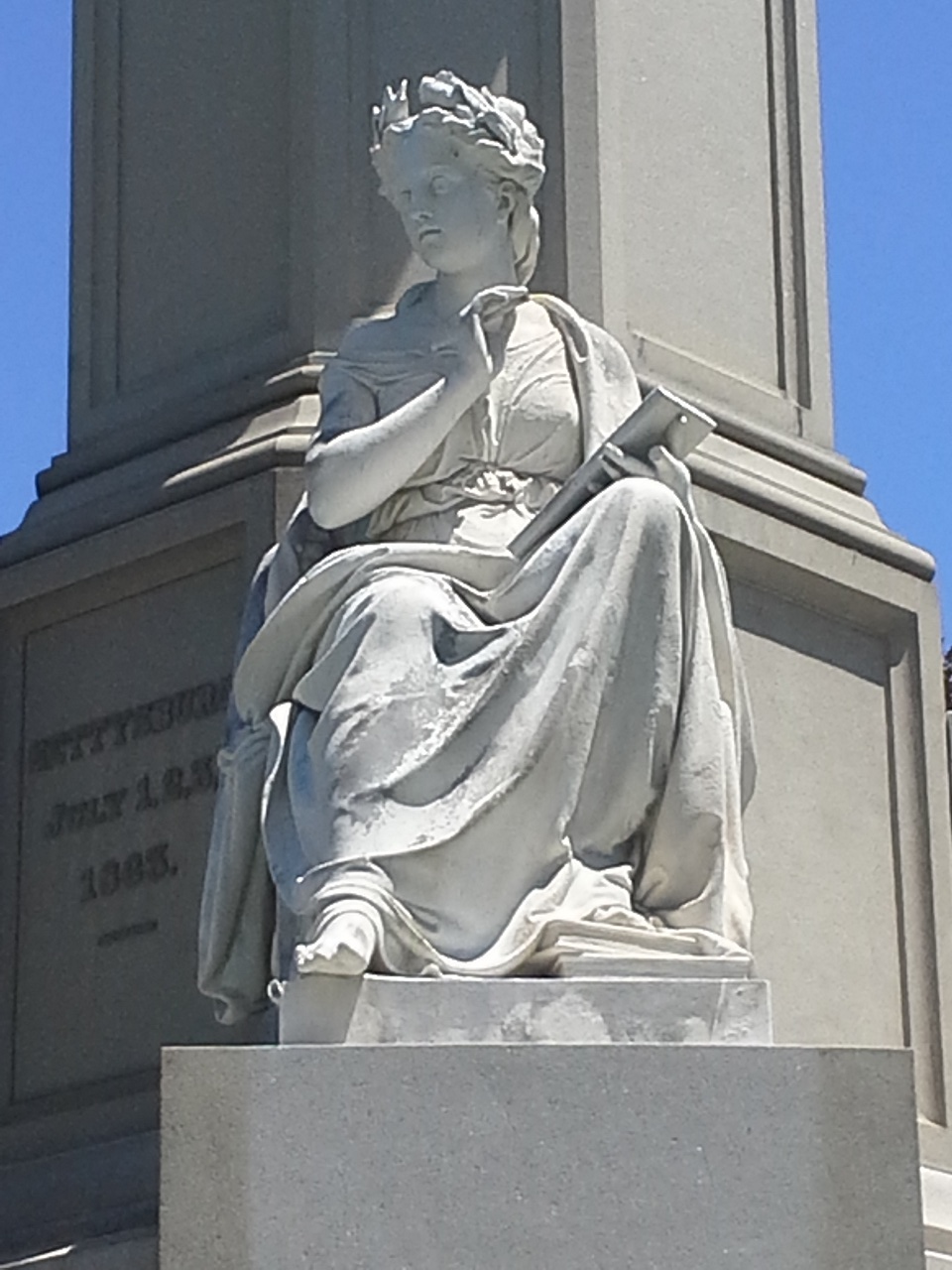
History

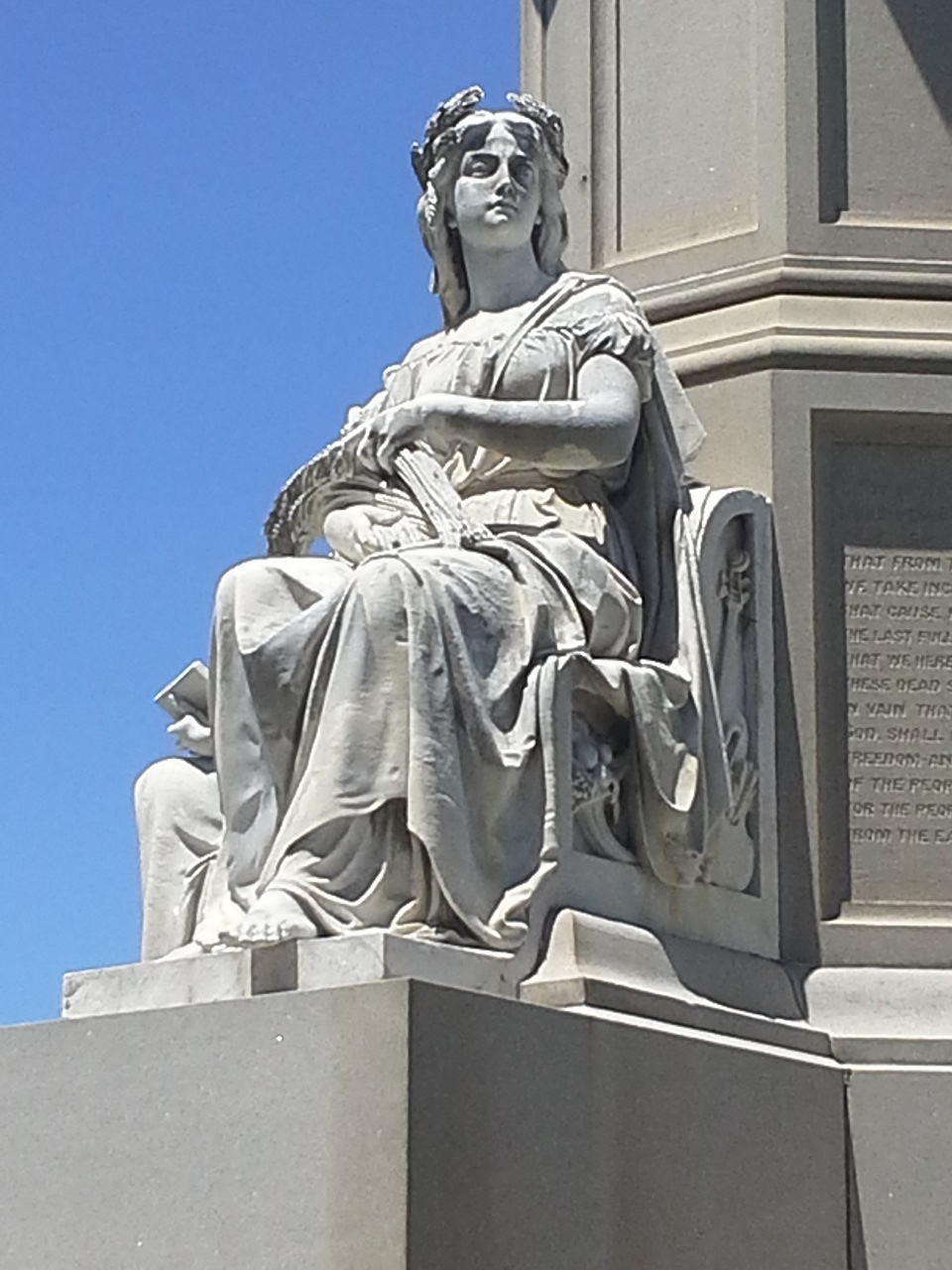
Plenty

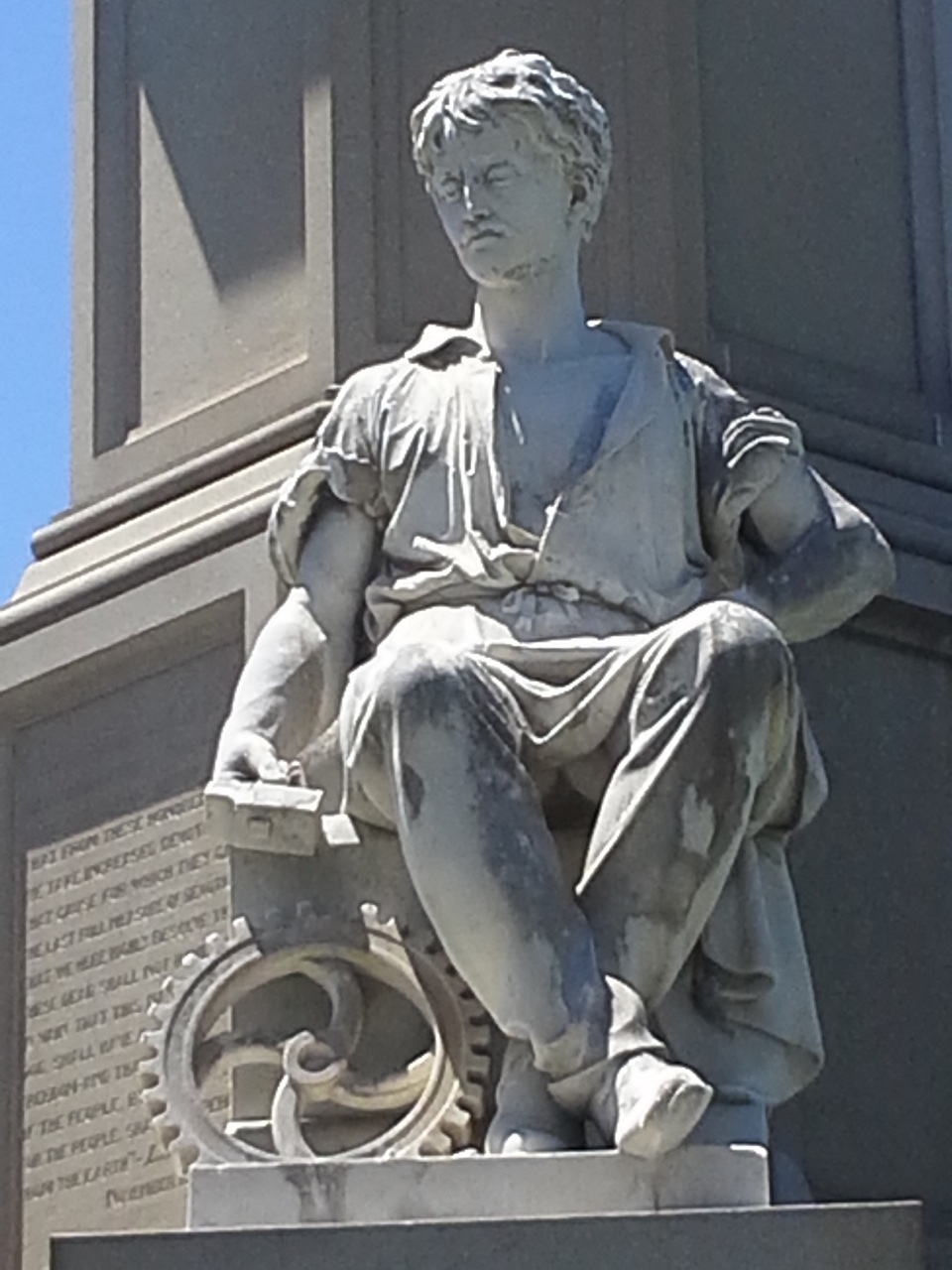
Peace

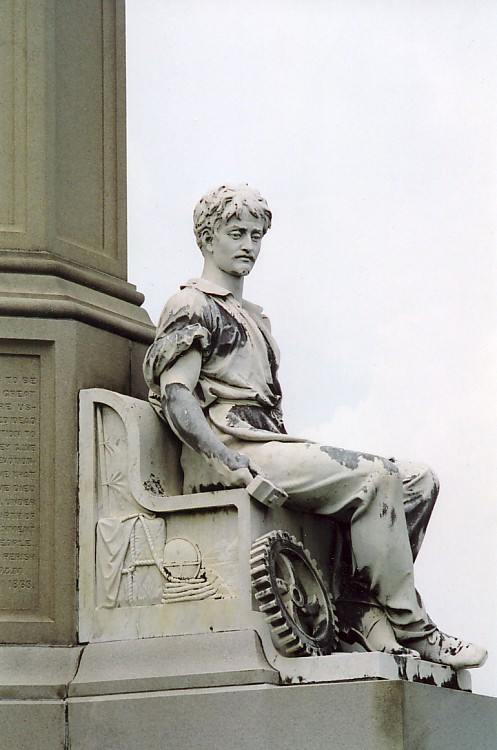
Peace, statue of mechanic holding a mallet in right hand.

External media

Images
- illustration with fence & uphill steps

Video
- 1955 MGM film (minute 9:09)
