= Maurice J. Power =

American sculptor

Maurice J. Power (c. 1836 – September 8, 1902) was a New York-based sculptor, politician and owner of the National Fine Art Foundry, New York City.

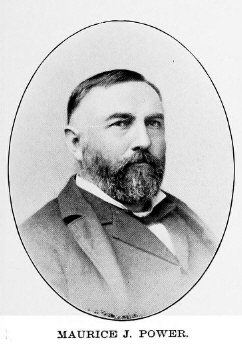

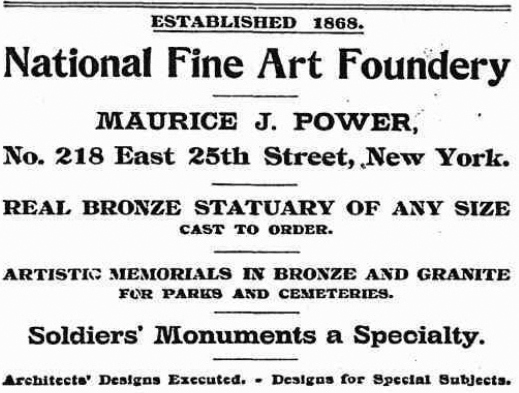
Advertisement in The Sun, October 9, 1892

== Early life and education ==
Power was born in Rosscarbery, Cork, Ireland. His parents emigrated to Utica, New York, when he was three years old.

He studied monumental sculpture under Robert Eberhard Launitz – at the same time as Casper Buberl, with whom he would later collaborate.

== Career ==
Power worked as a sculptor before, in 1868, establishing the National Fine Art Foundry at 218 East 25th Street in New York City. Many notable works of public art were produced by the foundry, including several American Civil War battle memorials.

Power entered politics and became involved with Tammany Hall during the William M. Tweed era, later joining the other Democratic Party factions: Irving Hall and the County Democracy, becoming chairman of the latter. He was a protégé of Samuel J. Tilden, worked for Hubert O. Thomson and held public offices, including: Police Court Justice for ten years from 1880, Shipping Commissioner for the Port of New York from 1893 and Aqueduct Commissioner from 1897.

His political influence helped artists such as sculptor William Rudolf O'Donovan gain sponsorship for public works of art, many of which were soldier monuments commemorating the American Civil War. These were often cast at Power's foundry. Power was the artist himself for similar works.

== Death ==
Power died at his home at 317 East 19th Street on September 8, 1902. He wife of 34 years, Mary F. O'Brien died in 1911. They had no children.
