= New York Monuments Commission =

Commission of the New York state government

The New York Monuments Commission for the Battlefields of Gettysburg, Chattanooga and Antietam was a commission set up by New York State in 1886 to honor the dead from Battle of Gettysburg, Battle of Chattanooga and Battle of Antietam. General Daniel Edgar Sickles served as chairman until forced out over accusations of embezzling $27,000 from the commission. Lewis R. Stegman replaced him as chairman in 1912.

== Chairmen ==
- General Daniel Edgar Sickles 1886 - 1912
- Colonel Lewis R. Stegman 1912 - ?
