= Gettysburg National Cemetery =

Battlefield cemetery created following the Battle of Gettysburg

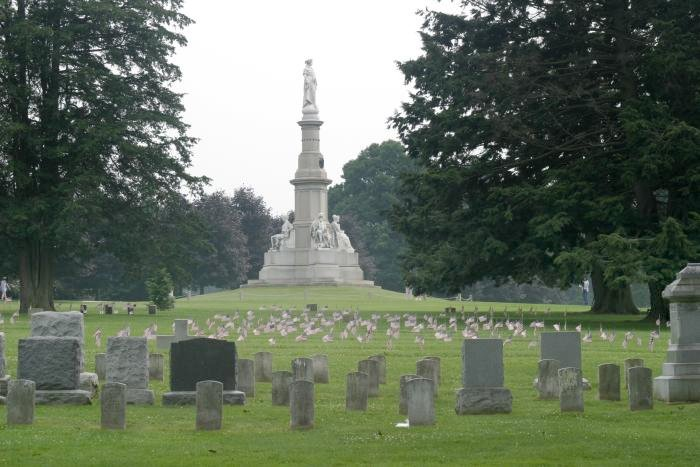
- The Soldiers' National Monument at the center of Gettysburg National Cemetery with 18 Union states' areas, one U.S. Regulars area, and three areas for graves of the unknown
- Interactive map of Gettysburg National Cemetery

Details
- Established: 19 November 1863; 162 years ago
- Location: Gettysburg National Military Park, Gettysburg, Pennsylvania
- Country: United States
- Coordinates: 39°49′2″N 77°13′55″W
- Type: National Cemetery
- Owned by: National Park Service
- Size: 17 acres (6.9 ha)

Gettysburg National Cemetery, originally called Soldiers' National Cemetery, is a United States national cemetery in Gettysburg, Pennsylvania, created for Union army casualties sustained in the Battle of Gettysburg during the American Civil War. The Battle of Gettysburg was fought over three days between July 1 to 3, 1863, and proved both the Civil War's deadliest and most significant battle. It resulted in over 50,000 casualties, the most of any battle in both the Civil War and all of American military history. But the battle also proved to be the war's turning point, turning the Civil War decisively in the Union's favor and leading ultimately to the nation's preservation.

On November 19, 1863, four and a half months after the Battle of Gettysburg, Abraham Lincoln, the 16th U.S. president, traveled to Gettysburg National Cemetery, where he participated in a ceremonial consecration of it and delivered the Gettysburg Address, which is now considered one of the most famous and historically significant speeches in American history. The day of Lincoln's Gettysburg Address is observed annually at the cemetery and in Gettysburg as "Remembrance Day", which includes a parade, procession, and memorial ceremonies by thousands of Civil War reenactor troops representing both Union and Confederate armies and descendant heritage organizations led by the Sons of Union Veterans of the Civil War (SUVCW) and the Sons of Confederate Veterans (SCV).

The cemetery contains 3,512 interments from the Civil War, including the graves of 979 unknowns. It also has sections for veterans of subsequent wars, including the Spanish–American War (1898), World War I (1917–1918), and others, and includes graves of the veterans' spouses and children. The total number of interments exceeds 6,000.

Battlefield monuments, memorials, and markers are scattered throughout the cemetery, and its stone walls, iron fences and gates, burial and section markers, and brick sidewalk are listed as contributing structures within Gettysburg Battlefield Historic District.

The land on which the cemetery is located was part of the Gettysburg Battlefield, and the cemetery is within Gettysburg National Military Park, which is administered by the National Park Service, a U.S. government agency administered by the U.S. Department of Interior.

== Description ==
The centerpiece of Gettysburg National Cemetery is Soldiers' National Monument (1869), a 60-foot-tall (18 m) granite monument designed by sculptor Randolph Rogers and architect George Keller. It is surrounded by concentric semicircles of graves, divided into 18 sections for Union states (1 each), a section for United States Regulars, and three sections for unknown soldiers.

Battlefield monuments within Gettysburg National Cemetery include those of the 1st United States Artillery Battery H, the 2nd Maine Battery, the 1st Massachusetts Battery (Cook's Battery), the 1st Minnesota Infantry, the 1st New Hampshire Light Battery, the 5th New York Independent Light Artillery, the 136th New York Volunteer Infantry, the 1st Ohio Battery H, the 55th Ohio Infantry, the 73rd Ohio Infantry, and the 75th Pennsylvania Infantry; and markers for the 1st Ohio Battery I and the 3rd Volunteer Brigade Artillery Reserve (Huntington's Brigade). Other monuments include the New York State Monument (1893), the Kentucky State Monument (1975), the Lincoln Address Monument (1912), the Friend to Friend Masonic Memorial (1994), the Major-General John F. Reynolds Statue (1872), and the Major-General Charles Collis Memorial (1906).

== History ==
In 1863, William Saunders was selected by a committee of Union governors to design the Soldiers National Cemetery. Saunders' radial plan of "simple grandeur," grouped the Union dead by states and focused on a central monument. The graves were marked with simple, unadorned, rectangular slabs of gray granite inscribed with the name, rank, company, and regiment of each soldier. Saunders noted in his description of the design that this repetition of "objects in themselves simple and common place" was meant to evoke a sense of "solemnity" which "is an attribute of the sublime." Officers and enlisted men were buried alongside one another to symbolize the egalitarian nature of the Union Army, which consisted mostly of volunteer citizen soldiers.

=== Reinterments ===
Union remains were transferred from the Gettysburg Battlefield burial plots, local church cemeteries, field hospital burial sites, including Camp Letterman, Rock Creek-White Run Union Hospital Complex, USA General Hospital, and the "Valley of Death" below Little Round Top, where unburied soldiers decomposed in place. Samuel Weaver, as "Superintendent of the exhuming of the bodies", personally observed the contractor's workers opening graves, placing remains in coffins, and burying them in the cemetery, and at least one reinterment from neighboring Evergreen Cemetery.

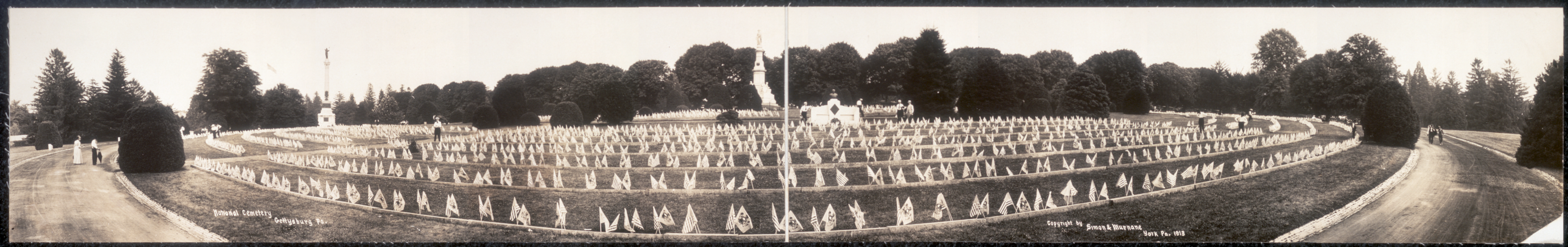
Gettysburg National Cemetery on the 50th anniversary of the Battle of Gettysburg in July 1913

=== Consecration ===
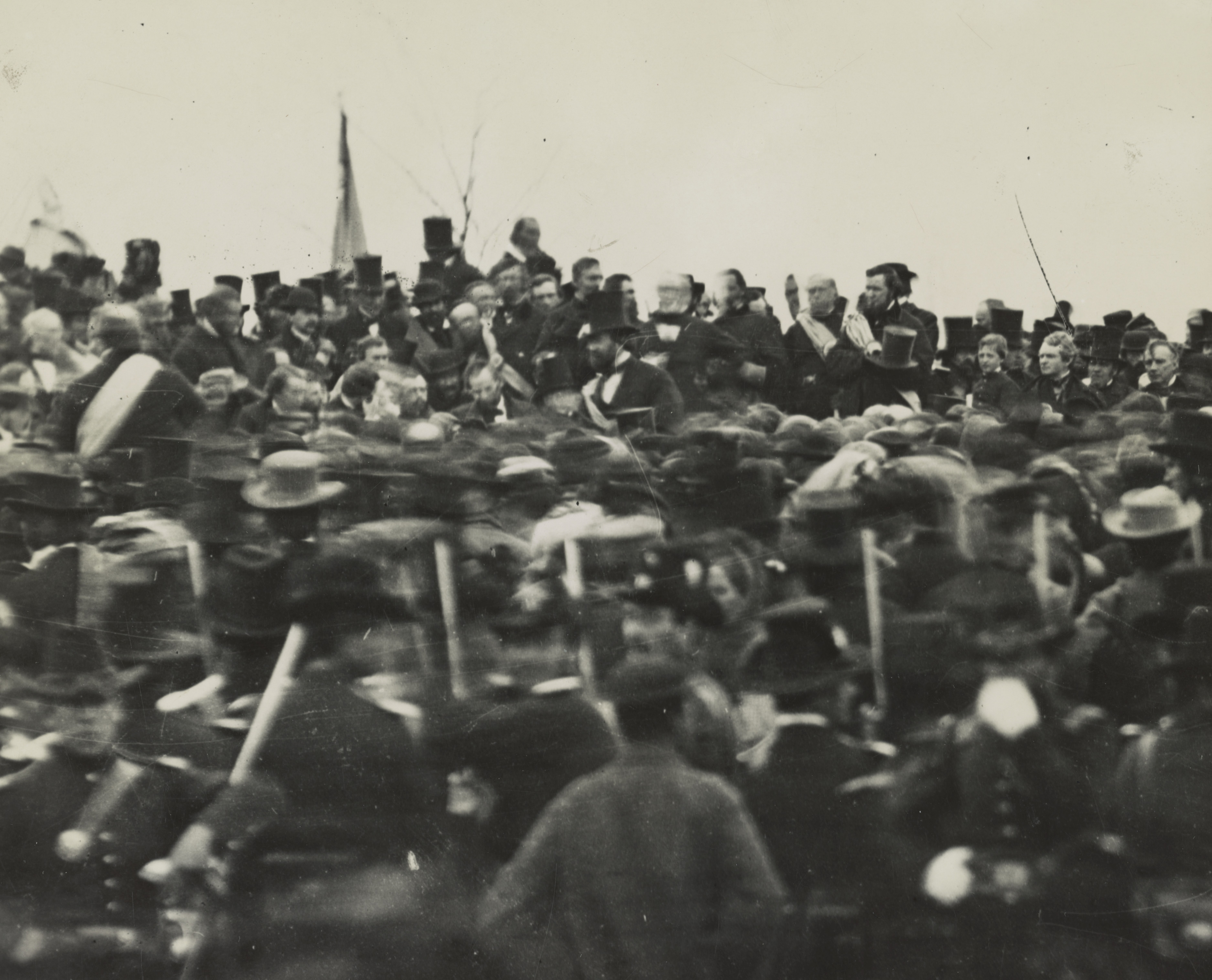
President Lincoln (seated, left of center) at the cemetery's consecration on November 19, 1863, several hours before he delivered his famed Gettysburg Address

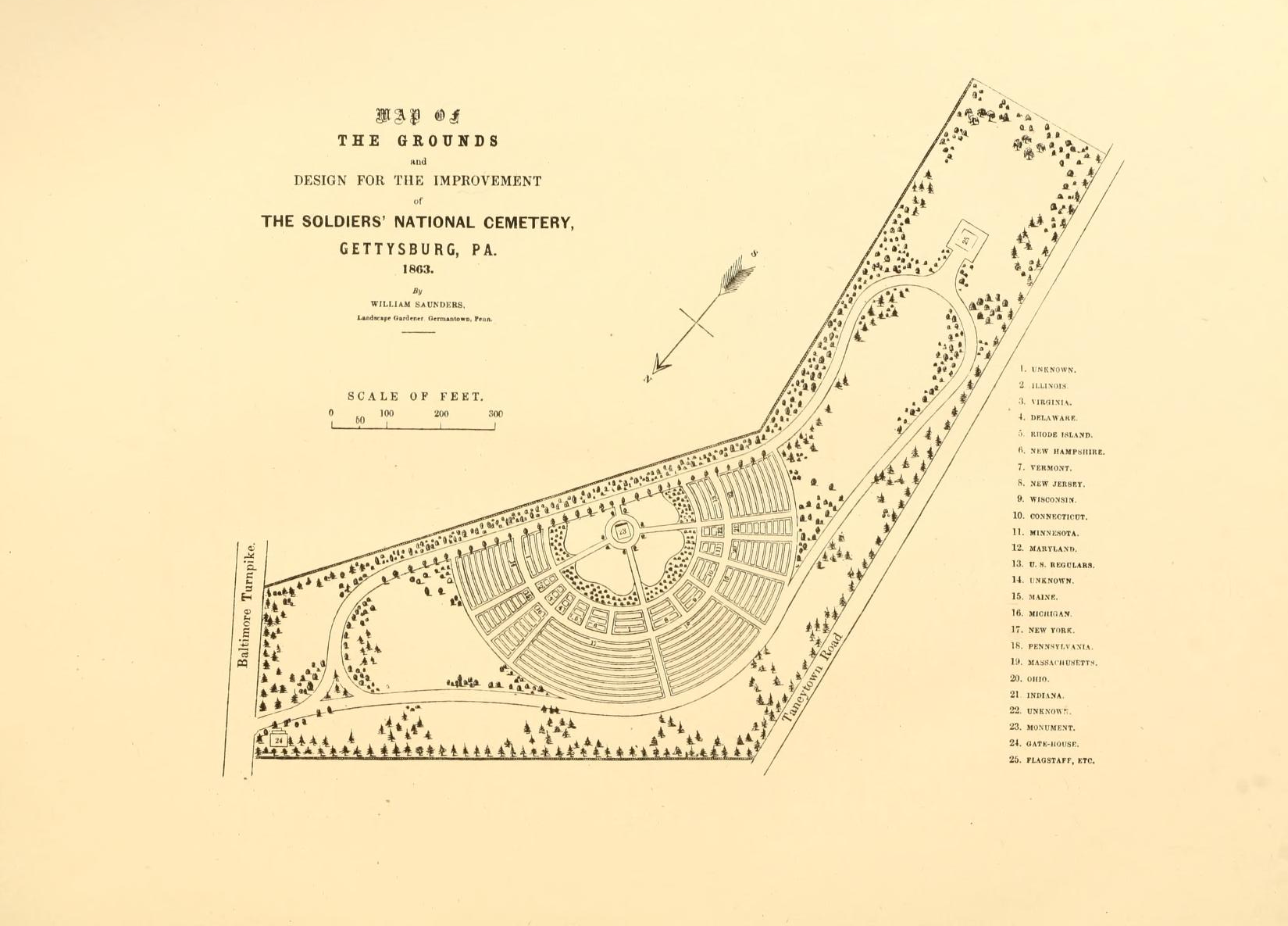
An 1863 map of Soldiers' National Cemetery

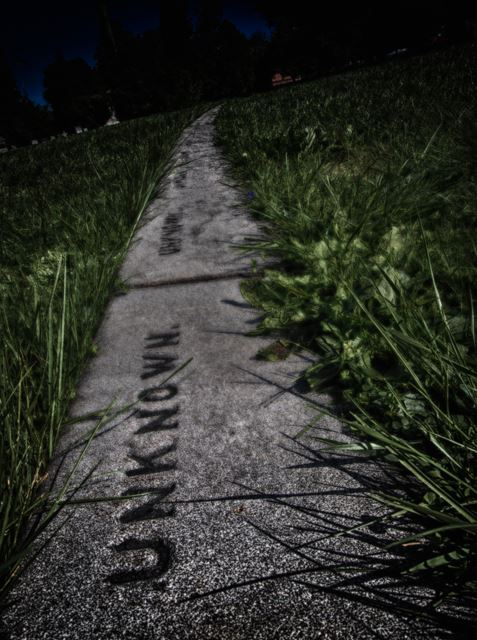
Granite bands mark the graves of unknown soldiers.

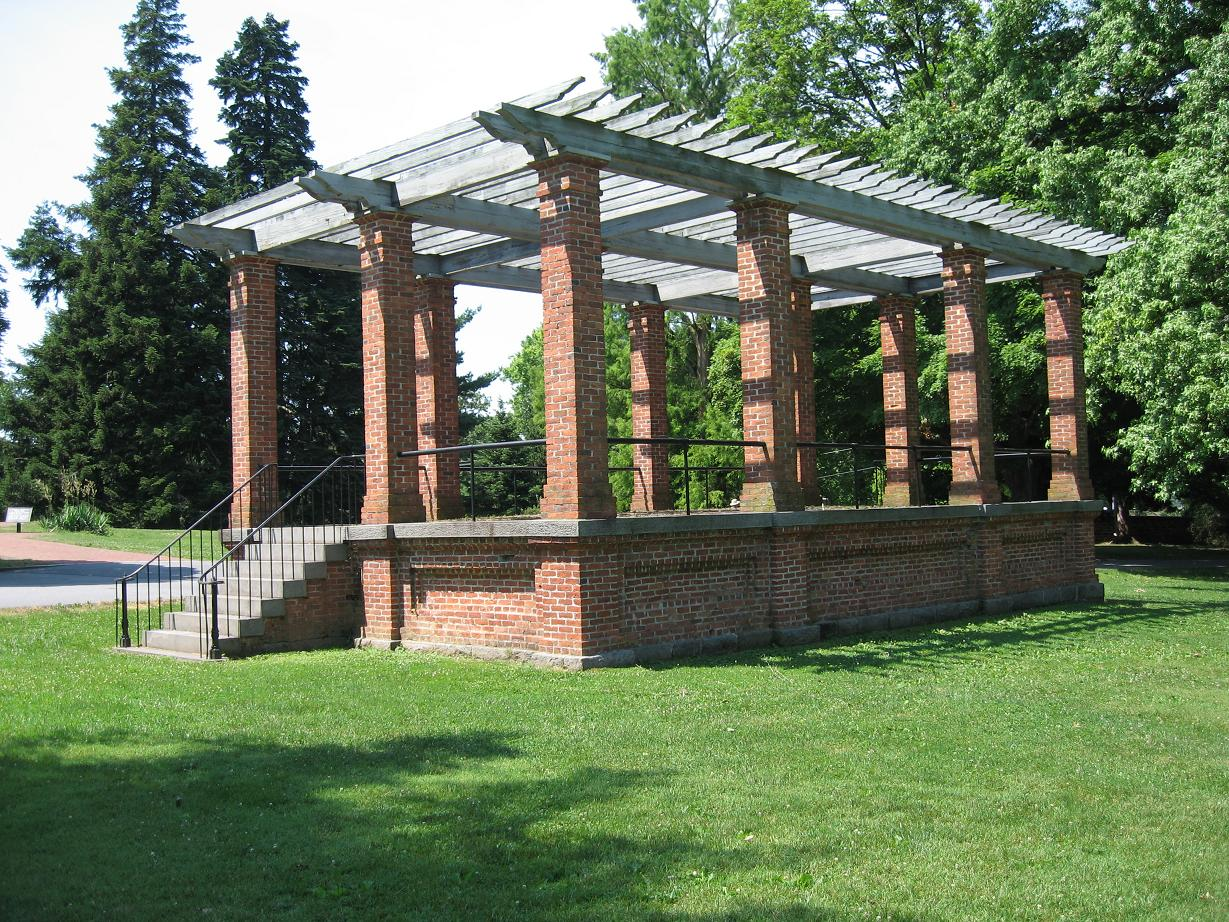
National Cemetery rostrum (1879)

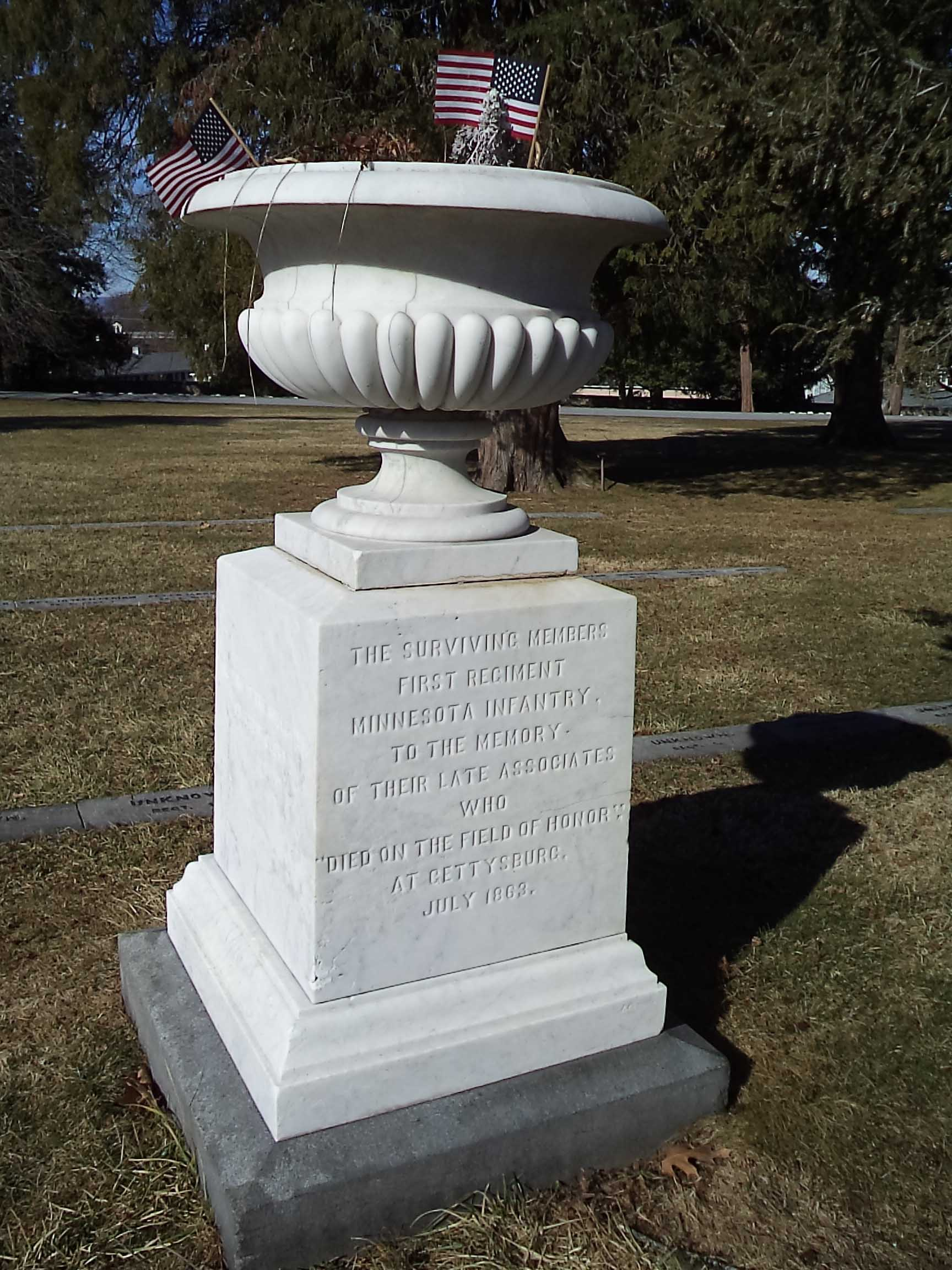
1st Minnesota Infantry Memorial Urn (1867), first battlefield monument installed in the national cemetery

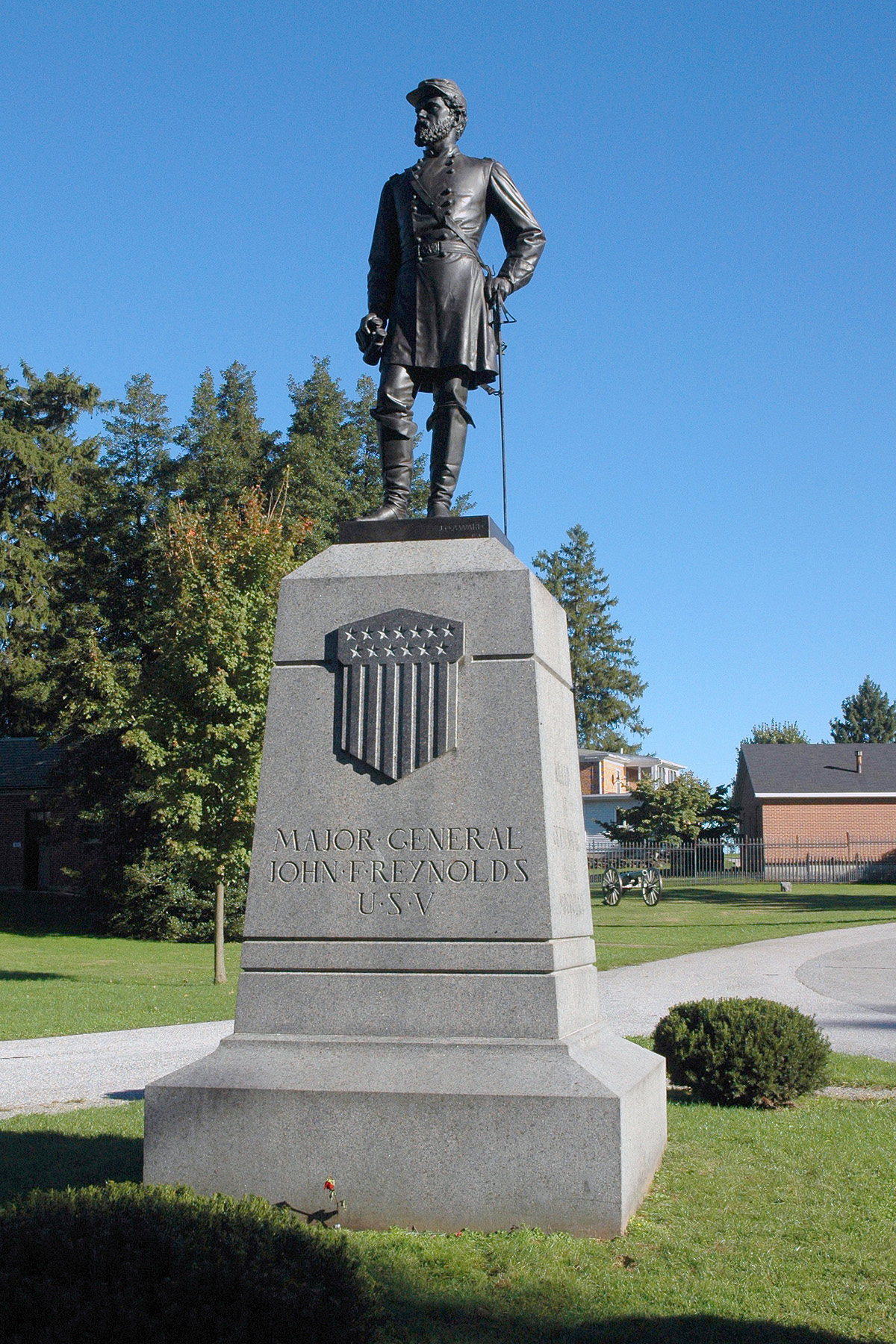
Major-General John F. Reynolds (1872) by John Quincy Adams Ward

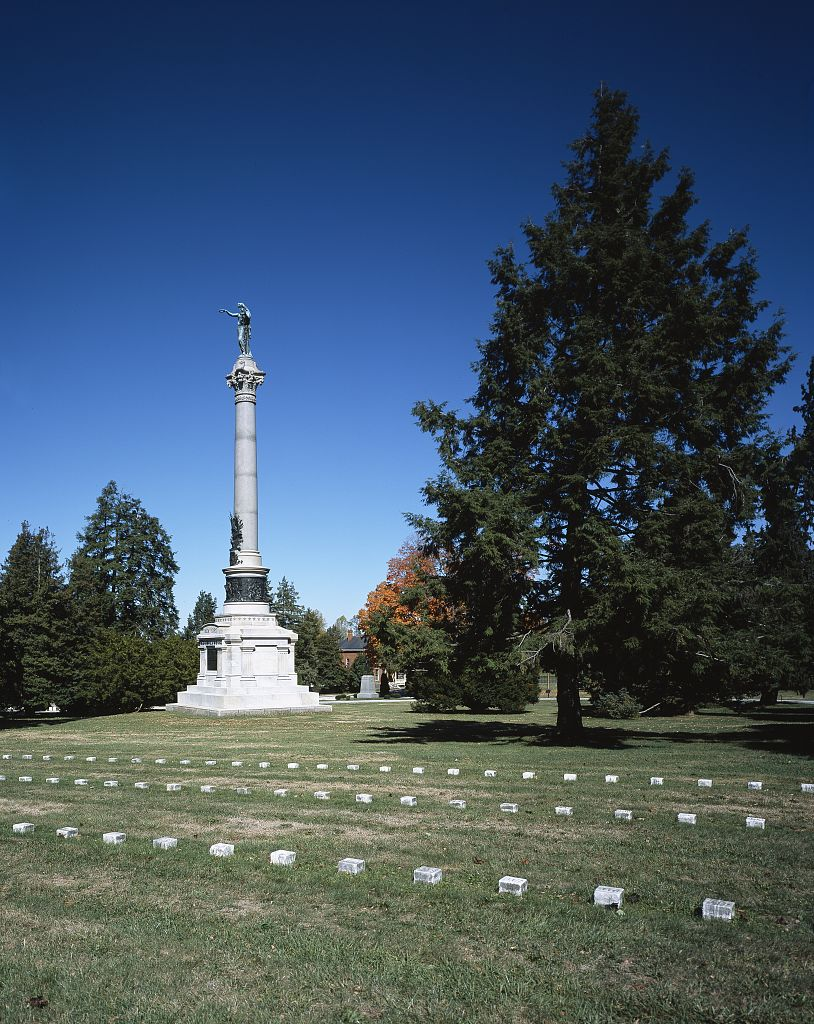
New York State Monument (1893)

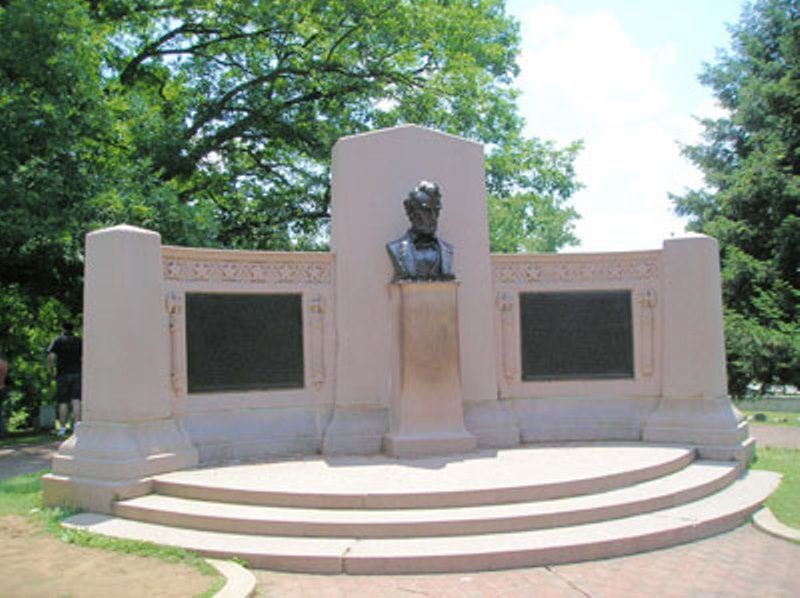
Lincoln Address Memorial (1912)

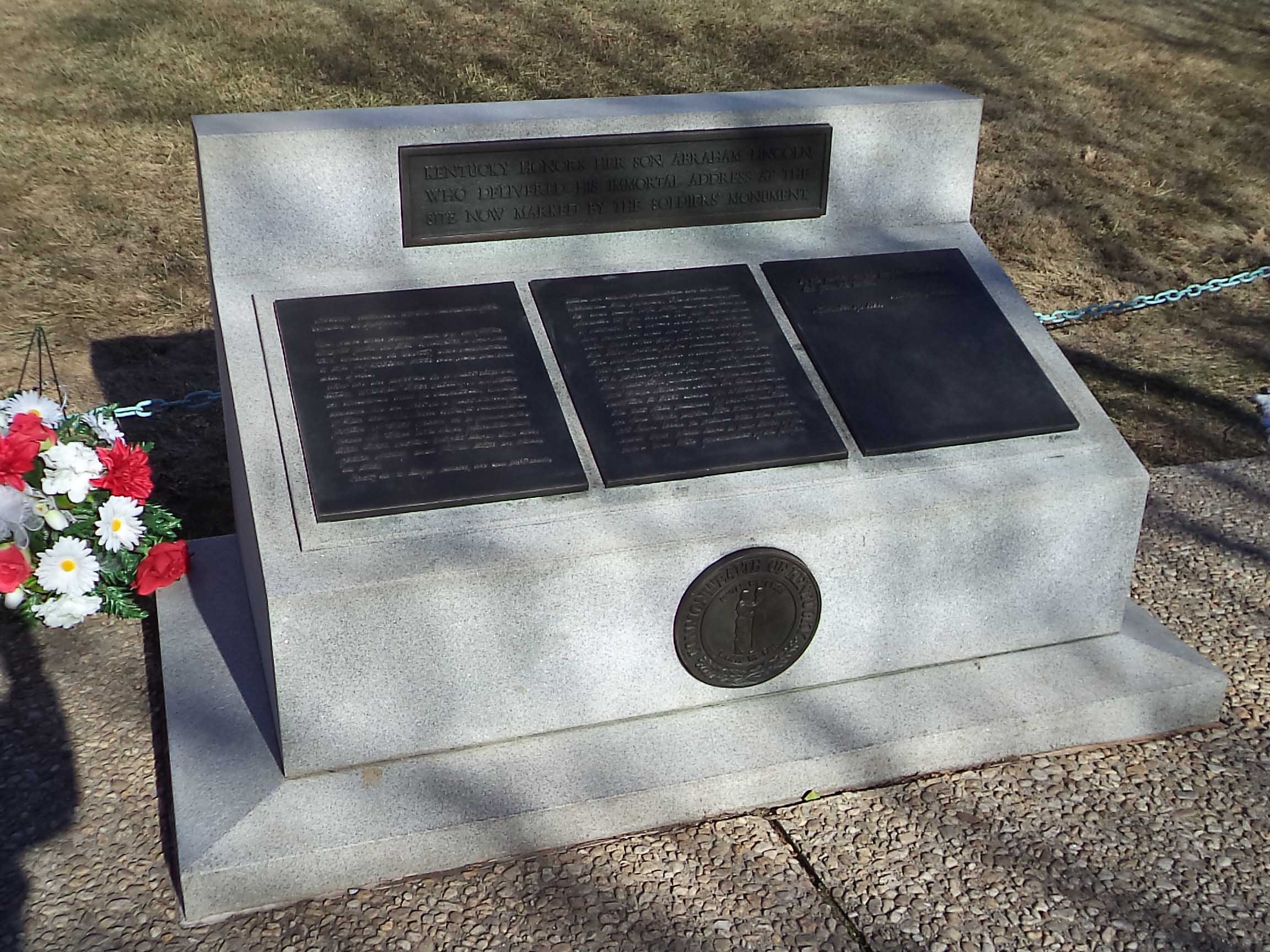
Kentucky State Monument (1975)

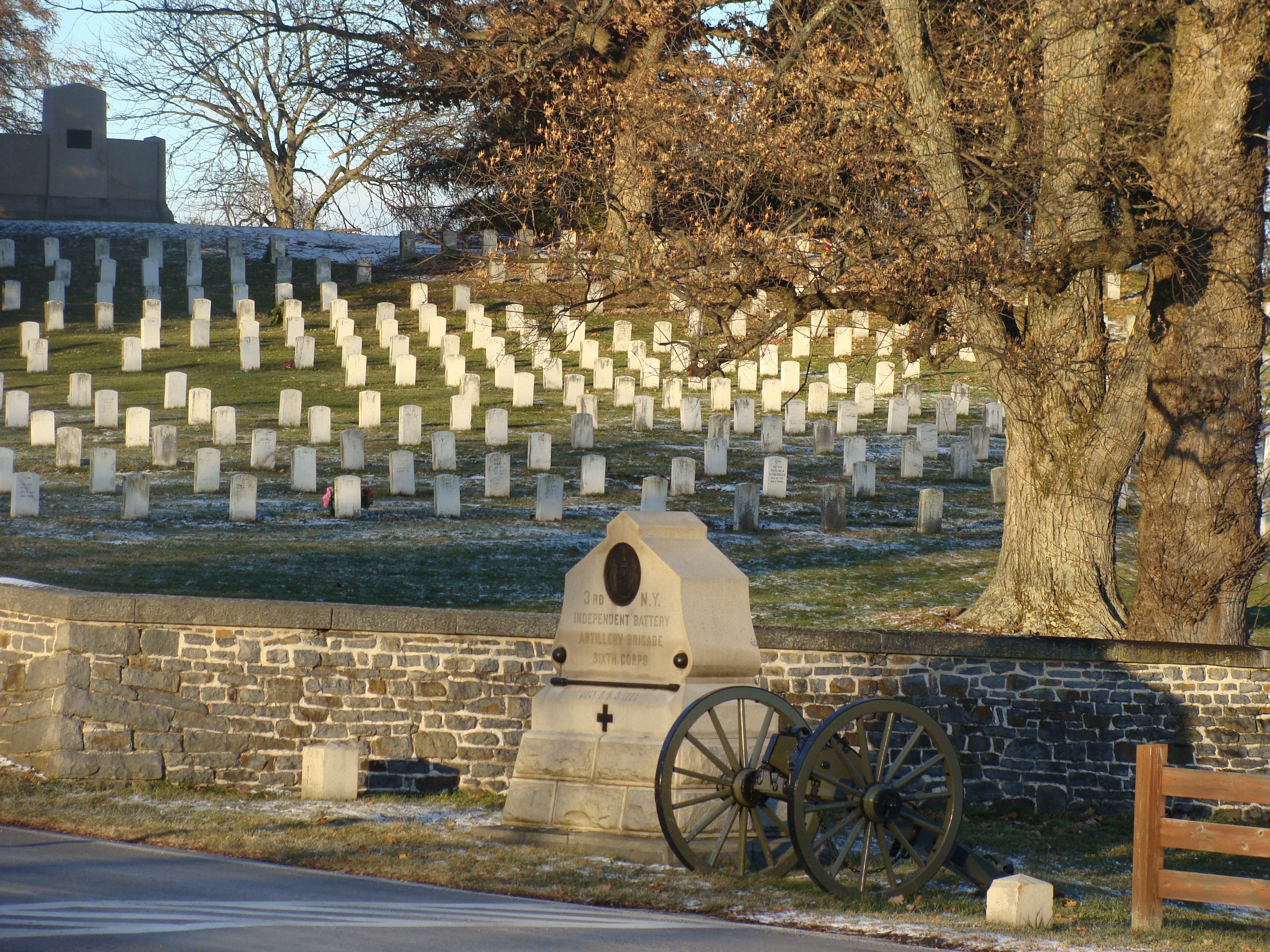
The cemetery's south end contains graves of soldiers from more recent wars. The back of the Lincoln Address Memorial is at upper left.

=== Chronology ===
Chronology
| Date | Event Symbols: †-interments ۩-structures §-superintendents |
|---|---|
| 1863-07-01 | Union artillery in the summit's cornfield at the subsequent cemetery site counterfired on Confederates west of Gettysburg at the seminary and railway cut. On July 2, Confederate sharpshooters in Gettysburg were "picking off" Federals on the hill. |
| 1863-07-04 | 8,900 dead soldiers were on the battlefield, and townspeople and farmers buried some of them at battlefield sites (e.g., along fences and stone walls). |
| 1863-07-07 | The local Provost Marshal solicited "Men, Horses, and Wagons…to bury the dead" in various Gettysburg Battlefield plots. |
| 1863-07-10 | The last "Rebel dead" were interred on the battlefield (horse carcasses remained to be buried). |
| | Battlefield land preservation began by August 5 with attorney David McConaughy's purchases including "the heights of Cemetery Hill" which he planned for a soldiers' cemetery where lots could be purchased for reinterring soldiers. |
| 1863-07-20 | "Peter Thorn", [sic] who was deployed from Gettysburg in a combat unit, began weekly newspaper ads for "removals into Ever Green Cemetery". |
| 1863-07-24 | David Wills, a Gettysburg attorney, recommended a state-funded cemetery at the south slope of East Cemetery Hill "on the Baltimore turnpike, opposite the Cemetery"—the open, sloped tract of 8 acres (3.2 ha) was sold by Peter Thorn in 1899. |
| 1863-07-28 | State funds regarding "Pennsylvanians killed [were for] furnishing transportation for the body and one attendant" to home cemeteries (600–700 coffins were used.) |
| 1863-08-14 | Wills, after being designated Pennsylvania Governor Andrew Curtin's agent, purchased McConaughy's summit tract and a day or so later a 2nd tract "between Evergreen and the five-acre tract of Miller's apple orchard" totalling 17 acres (6.9 ha) for $2,475.87 ($64,740 in 2025 dollars). |
| 1863-08-21 | Wills had contacted William Saunders about designing the cemetery. |
| 1863 | The reinterment contract was issued and required wooden boards nailed to the head of the coffins to protrude from the ground for displaying identities. |
| 1863-10-17 | † In a former cornfield of the battle, the first reinterments (Cpl Story & Pvt James) were from the 1804 "United Presbyterian Burying Ground". The "Associate Reformed Graveyard" closed in 1899 (at least five others are identified as reinterred from that graveyard.) |
| 1863-11-16 | ۩ A flagpole was erected "near the stand prepared for the world-renowned Orator, Hon. Edward Everett". The 12 ft × 20 ft (3.7 m × 6.1 m) "platform" was "on the spot where the monument is to be built…"fronting away from the cemetery [toward the subsequent] vast audience" (in Evergreen Cemetery). |
| 1863-11 | Joseph Becker sketched the flagpole, the "grand stand" ("speaker will face this way"), and East Cemetery Hill graves. |
| 1863-11-19 | ¶ President Abraham Lincoln delivered the Gettysburg Address after the Everett oration at the Consecration of the National Cemetery at Gettysburg. |
| 1863-11-24 | † 1188 remains, including 582 unknown, "had already been interred in the Cemetery". |
| 1863-12-07 | Wills advertised for farmers to report graves on their property. |
| 1863-12-17 | The Board of Commissioners of the Soldiers' National Cemetery at Gettysburg was organized at Harrisburg and incorporated on March 25, 1864. |
| 1864-02-03 | Michigan appropriated the first payment from a state for the cemetery. By the federal turnover in 1872, 18 states had contributed $129,523.24. |
| | The "city of Boston" exhumed 158 soldiers' remains for reinterment in Massachusetts. |
| 1864-03-19 | † Samuel Weaver reported 3,512 total Union bodies "taken up and removed to the Soldiers' National Cemetery" October 27-March 18. |
| 1864-03-21 | † Wills identified the cemetery had 3,564 total burials, including those buried directly in the cemetery (not exhumed) (e.g., Major George Tate's leg amputated at a hospital was buried in the cemetery which he annually visited from Massachusetts.) |
| 1864-12 | † 37 more bodies had been located and reinterred, the stone walls had been completed (the lodge nearly so), and the "main avenue" was "ready for macadamizing". |
| 1865 | Wills had iron fencing erected between the Soldiers' and Evergreen cemeteries contrary to the condition when Pennsylvania purchased McConaughy's tract. |
| 1865-03-06 | ۩ The cemetery's 3 stone walls and the brick "gate house" (lodge) were complete, and the gate was ready to be erected. |
| 1865-05 | § Daniel K. Snyder was appointed the cemetery superintendent, and was replaced in November by Sgt John McAllister. |
| 1865 | ۩ The wooden marker boards for each grave were replaced with gravestones (the CCC reset gravestones into concrete in 1934). |
| | † A Union soldier buried July 5, 1863, at South Mountain's Monterey toll house was reinterred at the cemetery (his wife visited both sites for the 1913 reunion). |
| 1865-07-04 | ۩ The "Exercises Incidental to the Laying of the Corner Stone" for the Soldiers' National Monument were conducted after designs had been requested in 1864. |
| 1867-06-19 | To plan the transfer to the federal government, the "Board of Managers" appointed a committee (Blake, Carr, Ferry, Hebard, McCurdy, Selleck, and Wills). |
| 1867-06-20 | The Committee of Arrangement of the Board of Commissioners of the National Cemetery met Governor Geary, who with General Grant visited the cemetery. |
| 1867 | ۩ The marble urn in the National Cemetery was dedicated to the 1st Minnesota Infantry. |
| 1869-07-01 | ۩ The Soldiers' National Monument was dedicated after the crowning statue of the Genius of Liberty had arrived in October 1868. On August 26, the "Plenty" statue was added to the monument, and the "Peace" statue was added between August 30, 1869, and September 21, 1887. |
| c. 1870 | ۩ The 2nd floor of the stone "gatehouse" (Greek Revival architecture) was expanded with a Mansard roof. |
| 1870-07-14 | "A Resolution Authorizing the Secretary of War to take charge of the Gettysburg and Antietam National Cemeteries" passed. |
| 1871-07-22 | The commissioners met ""to close up the business of the Board preparatory to its transfer to the National Government". |
| 1872-05-01 | Pennsylvania ceded the cemetery to the Department of War (the board of commissioners expired.) |
| 1872-08 | § Charles Stambaugh became the superintendent until July 1873. |
| 1872-08-31 | ۩ The Reynolds statue cast from bronze cannon tubes (Robert Wood & Co. foundry, J. Q. A. Ward design) was erected on a dark Quincy granite pedestal. |
| 1878-10 | ۩ 50 new iron settees were placed in the cemetery. |
| 1879-05 | ۩ The 1st rostrum of 20 ft × 40 ft (6.1 m × 12.2 m) was being completed by P. J. and J. J. Tawney, with 12 brick columns and a 5-foot-high (1.5 m) high floor. In addition to Decoration and Dedication days' observances, the building was used during military camps (e.g.,1882 Camp Burnside) and 1890 Camp Abe Patterson). |
| 1881-06 | † 20 skeletons plowed up on the Gelback Farm along the Emmitsburg Road were reinterred. |
| 1882 | ۩ 17 tablets were erected to display stanzas of Bivouac of the Dead (only 8 remain). |
| 1882-05-10 | † During Grand Central Avenue (now Hancock Avenue) construction, remains of a US soldier found on the Leister Farm were interred in the Cemetery. |
| 1884-11-08 | † First and only African-American veteran of the Civil War, Henry Gooden of the 127th Regiment United States Colored Troops, is buried among U.S. Regulars in the Civil War section. |
| 1887-10-01 | § Battlefield guide and assistant superintendent William Holtzworth replaced Supt. Nicholas G. Wilson who resigned to become the GBMA superintendent. |
| 1889 | † Remains found during avenue construction were reinterred in the cemetery, and the cemetery gate to the Taneytown Road was planned. |
| 1889-09 | Joseph H. Smith constructed the "grand stand…for use on Thursday, Pennsylvania Day – on the large lawn in front of the rostrum". |
| 1890 | ۩ Two "Act of Congress Tablets" were placed in the cemetery to commemorate the February 22, 1867 "act to establish and perfect National Cemeteries" (the congressional reburial program had been resolved on April 13, 1866). |
| 1891-02 | ۩ The cemetery's Taneytown Road (west) entrance was built at the summit curve of the Gettysburg Electric Railway. |
| 1891 | § Calvin Hamilton resigned as local school board president and became the cemetery superintendent after 2 years as assistant to W. D. Holtzworth. |
| 1892 | ۩ William H. Tipton photographed the cemetery's summer house near the west gate. |
| 1893-07-02 | ۩ After an October 1890 objection by Wills had been resolved, the Ionic New York State Monument was unveiled with the "statue of “Victory” in the presence of at least 12,000 persons". The ceremony concluded with an artillery salute by Battery C. |
| 1899 | † Remains found at the United Presbyterian Cemetery during construction of the shirt factory were reinterred in the cemetery. |
| 1899-09-23 | † Remains of 18 soldiers found on Culp's Hill were reinterred in the cemetery. |
| 1900 | † Remains found by fence builders on a farm were reinterred in the cemetery. |
| 1903 | ۩ A larger Gettysburg Rostrum was built 36.8 ft × 22 ft (11.2 m × 6.7 m) with a sod platform to replace the original 1879 rostrum. |
| 1904-05-30 | ¶ President Theodore Roosevelt delivered the Decoration Day address after detraining near the McPherson Ridge railway cut. |
| 1905 | The lodge at the Baltimore Pike entrance was dismantled (teacher Ruth Hamilton at the High Street School had lived at the lodge). |
| 1906 | ۩ $6000 was appropriated for a new lodge for the superintendent (Wm. H. Johns was the contractor). |
| 1908 | First placement of memorial flags on graves. |
| 1912-01-24 | ۩ The Lincoln Address Memorial was erected on the cemetery grounds "near site of original summer house". |
| | "A 205' macadam roadway [was] graded and piked around the Lincoln Memorial in 1909 [sic]." |
| 1914-04 | § Major M. M. Jefferys succeeded Calvin Hamilton as superintendent and the Jefferys family moved into the lodge. |
| 1915-05 | The "Three-Mile Picture Show" named for the length of film recorded wreath-laying at the Lincoln Address Memorial by local "colored residents". |
| 1915-05-06 | † Remains of a soldier discovered at Menchey's Spring on the base of East Cemetery Hill were reinterred in the cemetery. |
| 1915-05 | § Acting superintendent Harry E. Koch replaced Major Jefferys who resigned during illness while at "Johns Hopkins hospital". |
| 1915-09 | § Superintendent Austin. J. Chapman (1915 to 1918) prohibited hackmans' jitneys from carrying more than 15 persons into the cemetery. |
| 1928 | ¶ President Calvin Coolidge delivered the Memorial Day address in the rostrum. |
| 1928-09 | ۩ The brick comfort station at the cemetery opened. It was closed in 1931. (The 1st Gettysburg Parkitecture comfort station was built in 1933.) |
| 1930 | ¶ President Herbert Hoover delivered the Memorial Day address at the rostrum that had been temporarily extended by Army Quartermasters. |
| 1930-08-31 | § James W. Bodley retired after serving as superintendent since 1918. |
| 1933-06-10 | Executive Order 6166 combined management of the cemetery and military park with the Department of the Interior (Nine other cemeteries were transferred on July 28.) |
| 1933 | ۩ Lafayette Square fencing was moved to the cemetery after 1888 legislation had moved it to East Cemetery Hill in 1889 (installed by Calvin Gilbert). |
| 1936 | † A U.S. Colored Infantry soldier who died after the Civil War was reinterred from Yellow Hill Cemetery (Biglerville) into the cemetery. |
| 1938 | The National Park Service planted 200 rhododendron plants in the cemetery. |
| 1942 | § Captain Earl Taute was the cemetery superintendent. |
| 1947/48 | † 850 World War II dead were reinterred "from European and South Pacific theaters". |
| 1949 | Federal appropriations of $10,000 was planned to add 5 acres (2.0 ha) to the cemetery. |
| 1955 | ۩ The American Legion Tablet was placed in the cemetery to honor the "efforts of American fighting forces in preservation of freedom of all men." |
| 1955 | The Oscar-nominated The Battle of Gettysburg documentary filmed the cemetery. |
| 1963 | ¶ President Dwight D. Eisenhower was a dignitary in the Remembrance Day activities at the cemetery. |
| 1963-11-19 | Bethlehem Steel deeded 5 acres (2.0 ha) "to enlarge the present cemetery" during a luncheon for the Lincoln Fellowship's 25th anniversary. |
| 1967-04-15 | A design for the annex between the north wall of the cemetery and Steinwehr Avenue had plans for 1666 graves. |
| 1968-02 | † The first burial was completed at the annex (a 22-car parking lot had been contracted on January 23, 1968). |
| | † The last interment was made in the original cemetery area (closed October 27, 1972, except for spouse interments). |
| 1972 | The last formal speaker for a Decoration Day ceremony at the cemetery was in the rostrum. |
| 1976–08 | The National Park Service acquired the 4th of 6 houses along Steinwehr Avenue east of the Taneytown Road for the cemetery annex. |
| 1980 | ۩ The cemetery's 1864 stone walls were reconstructed. |
| 1993-08-21 | ۩ The Friend to Friend Masonic Memorial in the annex was dedicated by the Grand Lodge of Pennsylvania. |
| 1997-07-01 | † Remains of a soldier discovered in 1996 during Seminary Ridge excavation were interred in the cemetery. |
