= Gettysburg Rostrum =

Gettysburg Battlefield venue for historical commemorations

Coordinates: 39.81786°N 77.23191°W

External images
- c. 1903 photograph
- 1911 photograph

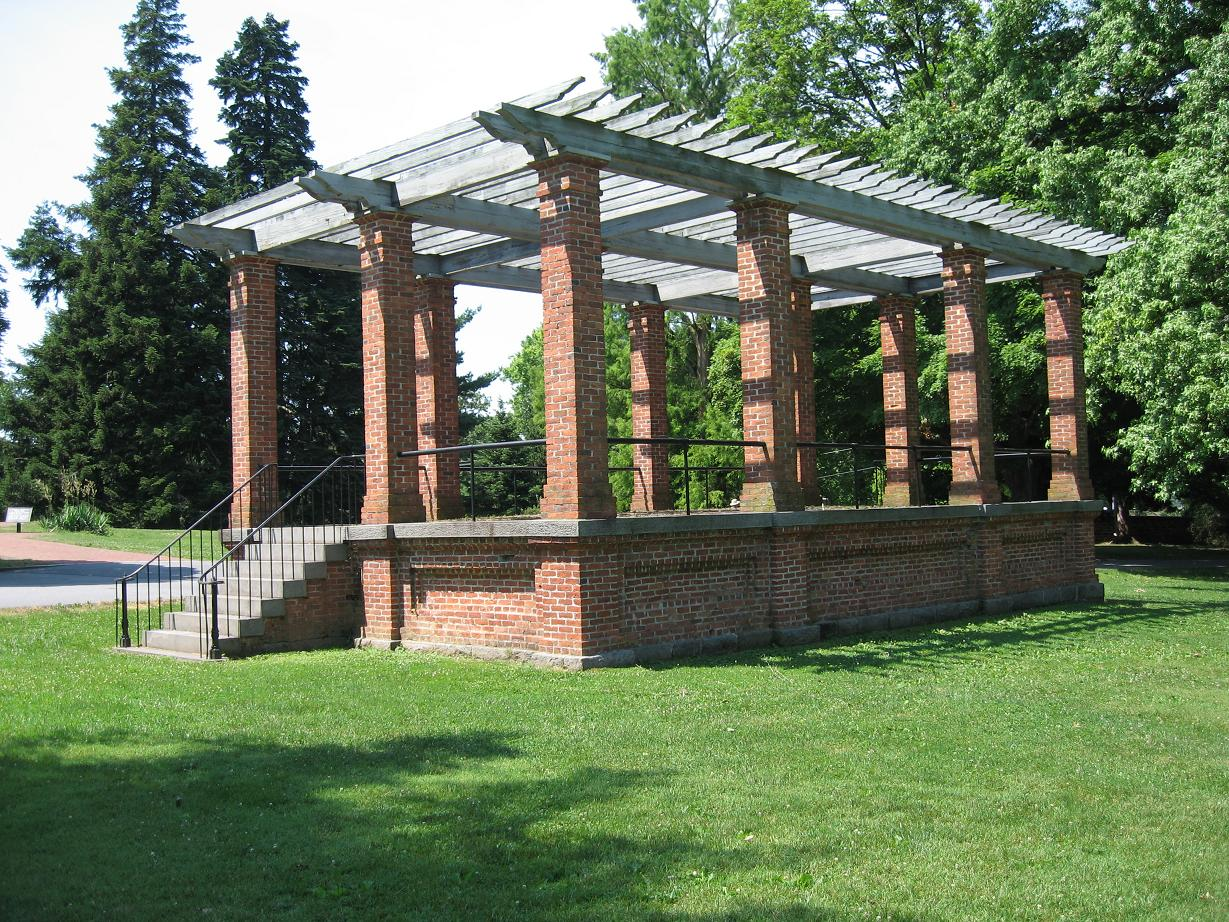
Gettysburg Rostrum

The Gettysburg Rostrum is a brick speaker's stand located at Gettysburg National Cemetery. It was Identified in 1908 as the location of the Gettysburg Address. However, it is now believed the address was given elsewhere. The pavilion was constructed in 1879 by P. J. and J. J. Tawney, extended in 1904, and was restored in 2013 for the 150th anniversary of the Gettysburg Address. The stand has been used by multiple presidents including Theodore Roosevelt (1904), William Howard Taft, Calvin Coolidge (1928), Herbert Hoover (1930), Franklin D. Roosevelt (1934), and Dwight D. Eisenhower (1955).
