= Window of Time =

- Cover of the 1991 White Mane Pub. Co. edition
- Author: Karen Weinberg
- Language: English
- Publication date: 1991

Window of Time is a children's book by Karen Weinberg and illustrated by Annelle Woggon Ratcliffe. It was published in 1991 by White Maine Publishing Company. Targeted to 8 to 12 year olds, the story follows a Westminster, Maryland-based boy living in 1988 who accidentally time traveled to the Battle of Gettysburg. The cover was designed by Harry A. West.
