= Harry W. Pfanz =

American historian

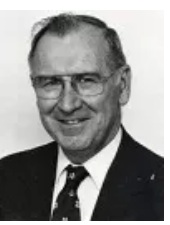
- Born: Harry Wilcox Pfanz; December 9, 1921; Bexley, Ohio, U.S.
- Died: January 27, 2015 (aged 93); Gaithersburg, Maryland, US
- Occupation: Historian
- Spouse: Letitia Earll Pfanz.
- Children: 3
- Awards: U.S. Department of the Interior Distingusied Service Award

Academic background
- Education: Ohio State University (BA); (PhD)
- Doctoral advisor: Harry Simms

Academic work
- Institutions: National Park Service
- Main interests: American Civil War

Harry W. Pfanz (December 9, 1921 - January 27, 2015) was an American historian who specialized in the American Civil War. It was said that he "probably knows as much about the Battle of Gettysburg as anyone."

== Early life ==
Pfanz was born in Bexley, Ohio. In 1943, he graduated from Ohio State University. He served in the U.S. Army during World War II and was badly wounded at the Battle of the Bulge. After the war, in 1958, he earned his Phd at Ohio State.

== Career ==
Pfanz worked at Gettysburg National Military Park1956 to 1966, including a portion of time as chief historian. Afterwards, he worked as the superintendent at Jefferson Expansion National Memorial. From 1974-1980, he was chief historian at the U.S. National Park Service In 1987, after he retired, he wrote Gettysburg: The Second Day. Richard Snow writing in The New York Times called the book "[an] admirable tapestry, and the result is a tribute worthy of the efforts of the men who took part..." Historian Gary W. Gallagher called the book "a standard for tactical studies..." In 2001, he finished his series on the Battle of Gettysburg with Gettysburg: The First Day.

== Personal life ==
Pfanz's son Donald was a retired National Park Service historian, as well, and editor of the letters of Confederate General Richard S. Ewell His son died on September 2, 2025.

== Works ==
=== Books ===
- Gettysburg: The Second Day, University of North Carolina Press, 1987, ISBN 978-0807817490
- Gettysburg: Culp's Hill & Cemetery Hill, University of North Carolina Press, 1993, ISBN 978-0807821183
- Gettysburg: The First Day, University of North Carolina Press, 2001, ISBN 978-0807826249

=== Selected articles ===
- "The Surrender Negotiations Between General Johnston and General Sherman, April 1865," Military Affairs, vol. 16, no. 2 (Summer, 1952), pp. 61–70. In JSTOR.
