= List of Canadian sports personalities =

The following is a list of Canadian sports personalities.

== Olympic athletes ==
- Jean-Paul Banos (born 1961), fencer
- Alex Baumann (born 1964), Sudbury, swimmer
- Josh Binstock (born 1981), volleyball player
- Patrick Chan (born 1990), Ottawa
- Victor Davis (1964–1989), Guelph, swimmer
- Andre De Grasse (born 1994), Scarborough/Markham
- Sarah Douglas (born 1994), Burlington sailor
- Lori Dupuis (born 1972), Cornwall, hockey player
- Dave Edge (born 1954), British-Canadian Olympic long-distance runner
- Terry Farnsworth (born 1942), Olympic judoka
- Mark Fawcett (born 1972), Nelson, British Columbia
- Shaul Gordon (born 1994), Canadian-Israeli Olympic sabre fencer
- Alex Harvey (born 1988), Saint-Ferréol-les-Neiges, cross-country skier
- Wendy Lumby (born 1966), Calgary, Alberta
- Rosie MacLennan (born 1988), King City
- Conlin McCabe (born 1990), Brockville, rower
- Scott Moir (born 1987), London
- Dylan Moscovitch (born 1984), medallist pairs skater
- Garth Pischke (born 1955), indoor beach volleyball player
- Sam Schachter (born 1990), Olympic beach volleyball player
- Elvis Stojko (born 1972), Richmond Hill
- Adam van Koeverden (born 1982), Oakville, kayaker
- Tessa Virtue (born 1989), London, ice dancer
- Simon Whitfield (born 1975), Kingston
- Curt Harnett (born 1965), Thunder Bay, cyclist

== Australian rules football ==
- Mike Pyke (born 1984), former Canada rugby union international and first Canadian to play for an AFL premiership (championship) team

== Automobile racing ==
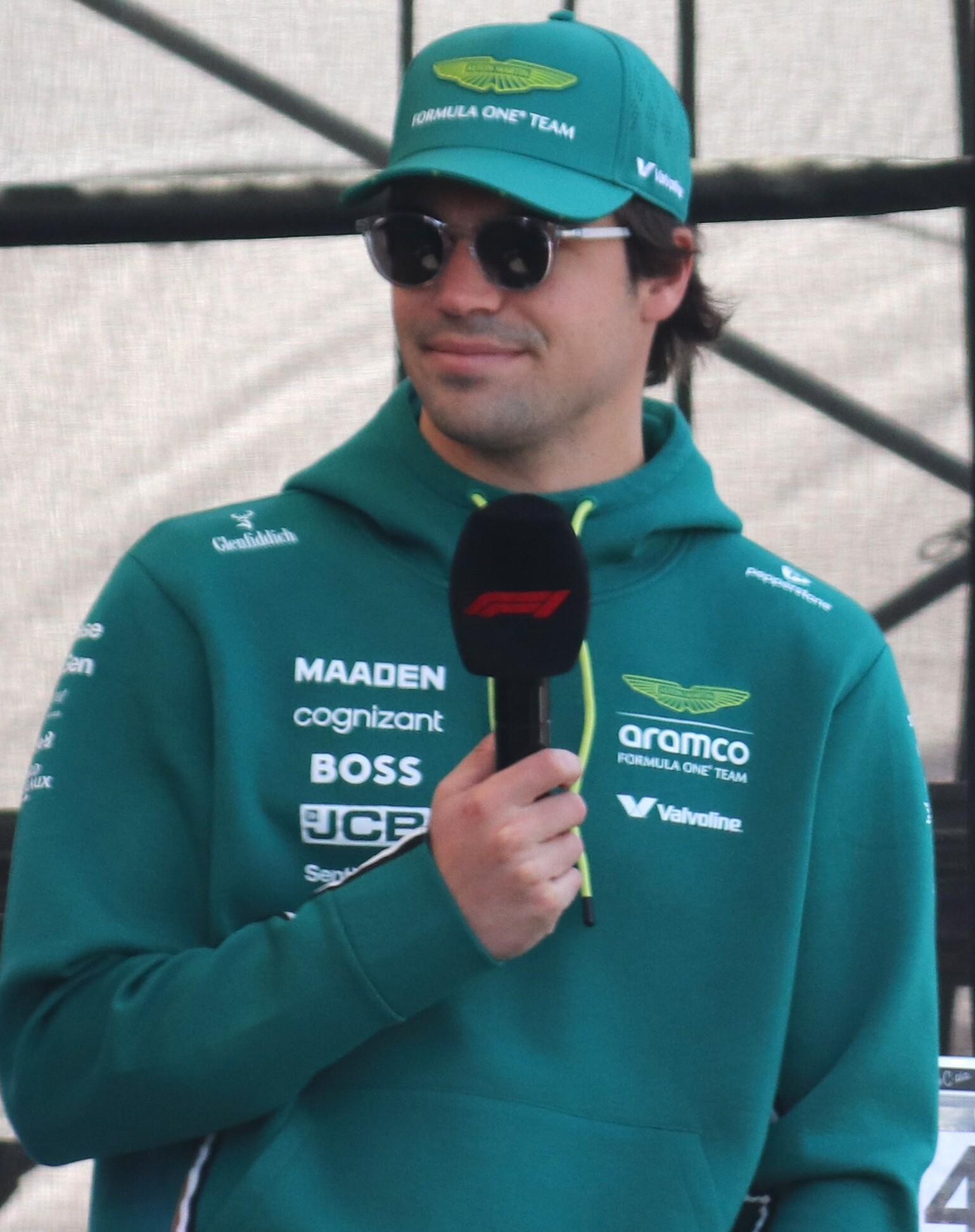
Lance Stroll

- Patrick Carpentier (born 1971)
- Ron Fellows (born 1959), 24 Hours of Le Mans GTS class winner
- Scott Goodyear (born 1959)
- James Hinchcliffe (born 1986)
- Nicholas Latifi (born 1995)
- Raphaël Lessard (born 2001)
- Greg Moore (1975–1999)
- Bruno Spengler (born 1983), DTM winner
- Lance Stroll (born 1998), Italian F4 champion in 2014, Toyota Racing Series champion in 2015, and 2016 FIA European Formula 3 champion
- Alex Tagliani (born 1972)
- Paul Tracy (born 1968), CART Champion 2003
- Gilles Villeneuve (1950–1982)
- Jacques Villeneuve (born 1971), son of Gilles, Formula 1 World Champion 1997, Indy 500 Winner 1995, CART Champion 1995
- Robert Wickens (born 1989)

== Baseball ==
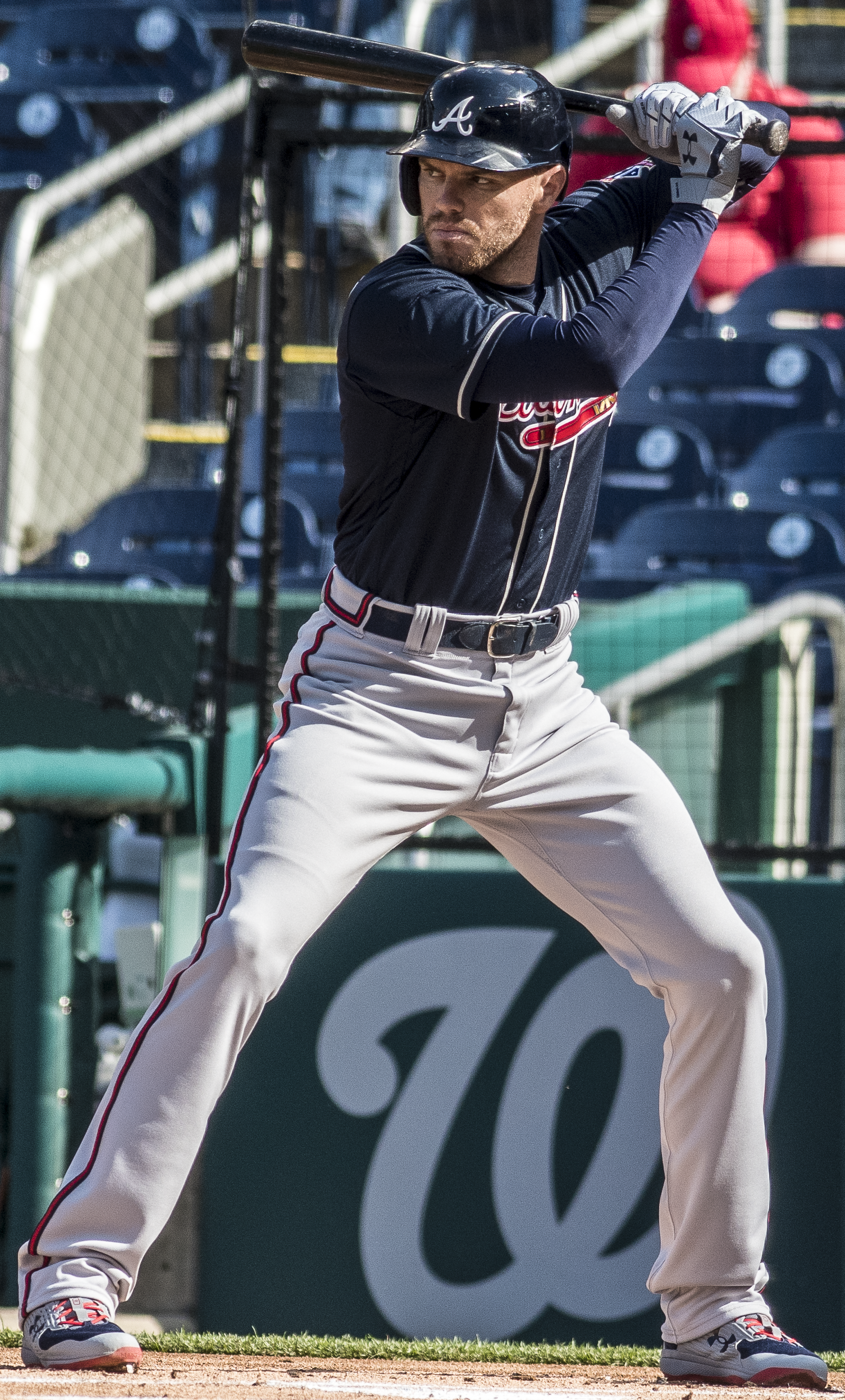
Freddie Freeman

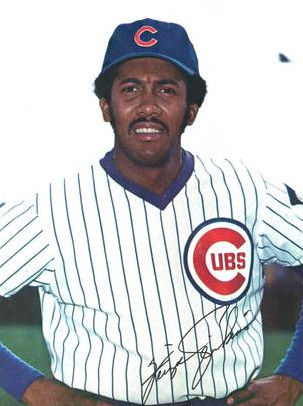
Ferguson Jenkins

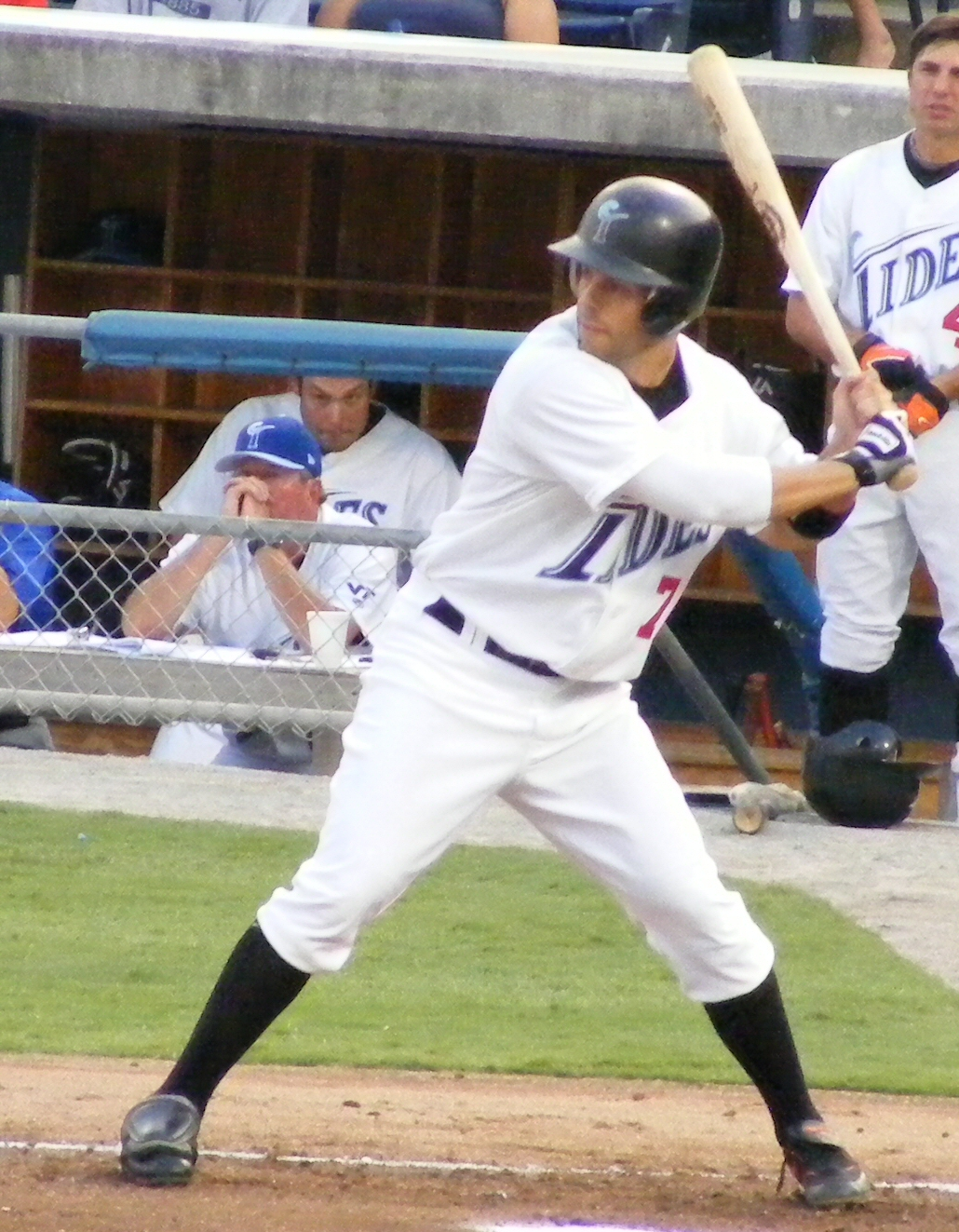
Adam Stern

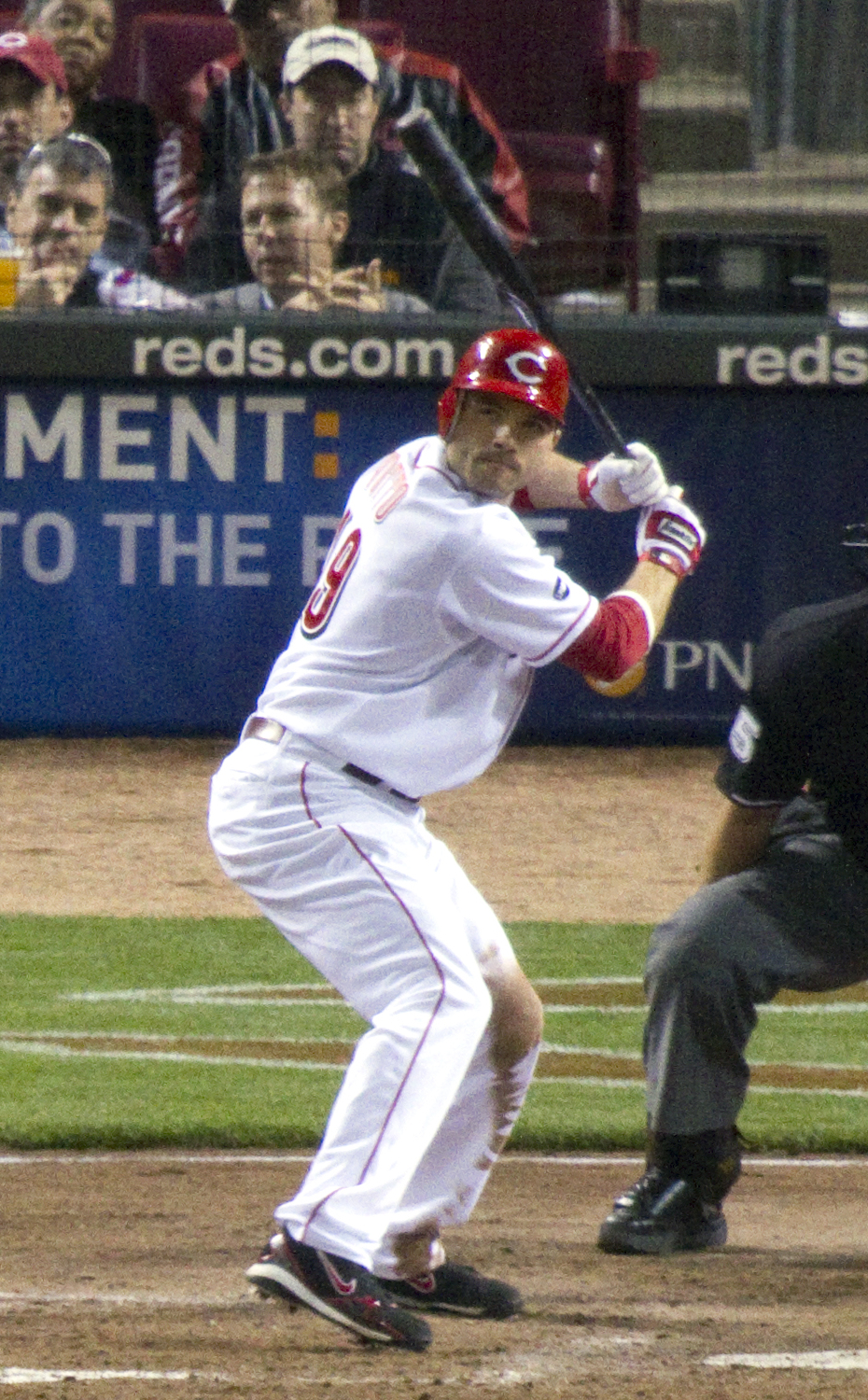
Joey Votto

- John Axford (born 1983)
- Jason Bay (born 1978), 3x MLB All Star, 2004 NL Rookie of the Year
- Érik Bédard (born 1979)
- Reggie Cleveland (born 1948)
- Rhéal Cormier (1967–2021)
- Jesse Crain (born 1981), All Star
- Tom Daly (1891–1946), Major League Baseball (MLB) player and coach
- Ryan Dempster (born 1977), 2x MLB All Star
- Scott Diamond (born 1986)
- Jeff Francis (born 1981)
- Éric Gagné (born 1976), 3x MLB All Star, Cy Young Award winner (2003)
- Aaron Guiel (born 1972)
- Rich Harden (born 1981)
- Blake Hawksworth (born 1983)
- Ferguson Jenkins (born 1942), 3x MLB All Star, first Canadian to gain election to National Baseball Hall of Fame (1991)
- George Kottaras (born 1983)
- Pete Laforest (born 1978)
- Joseph Lannin (1866–1928), owner of the Boston Red Sox who signed Babe Ruth
- Brett Lawrie (born 1990)
- Adam Loewen (born 1984)
- Russell Martin (born 1983), 4x All Star
- Scott Mathieson (born 1984)
- Kirk McCaskill (born 1961)
- Justin Morneau (born 1981), 2006 American League MVP, 4x All Star
- Mike Nickeas (born 1983)
- Pete Orr (born 1979)
- James Paxton (born 1988), pitched a no hitter in 2018
- Terry Puhl (born 1956), MLB All Star, Canadian Baseball Hall of Fame
- Paul Quantrill (born 1968), All Star
- Ryan Radmanovich (born 1971)
- Chris Reitsma (born 1977)
- Goody Rosen (1912–1994), MLB All-Star outfielder, Canadian Baseball Hall of Fame
- George Selkirk (1908–1987), succeeded Babe Ruth in right field for NY Yankees
- Matt Stairs (born 1968)
- Adam Stern (born 1980)
- Mark Teahen (born 1981)
- Scott Thorman (born 1982)
- Larry Walker (born 1966), first Canadian to win the Most Valuable Player Award (MVP) of Major League Baseball (1997), 5x All Star
- Nigel Wilson (born 1970)
- Jeff Zimmerman (born 1972), All Star
- Joey Votto (born 1983), Canadian-American, 2010 National League MVP, 6x MLB All Star

=== Current players ===
- Vladimir Guerrero Jr (born 1999), Canadian-Dominican, 5x MLB All Star
- Bo Naylor (born 2000)
- Josh Naylor (born 1997), All Star
- Tyler O'Neill (born 1995)
- Nick Pivetta (born 1993)
- Zach Pop (born 1996)
- Abraham Toro (born 1996)
- Andy Yerzy (born 1998), catcher/first baseman

== Basketball ==
Current NBA players

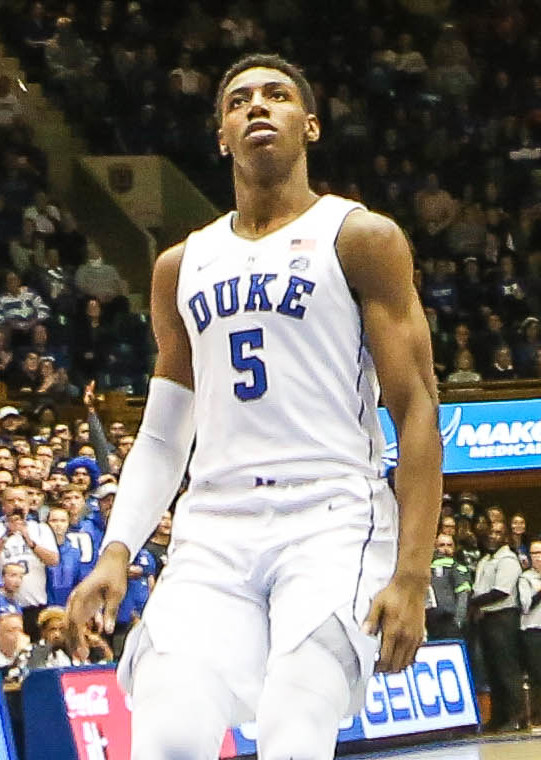
RJ Barrett

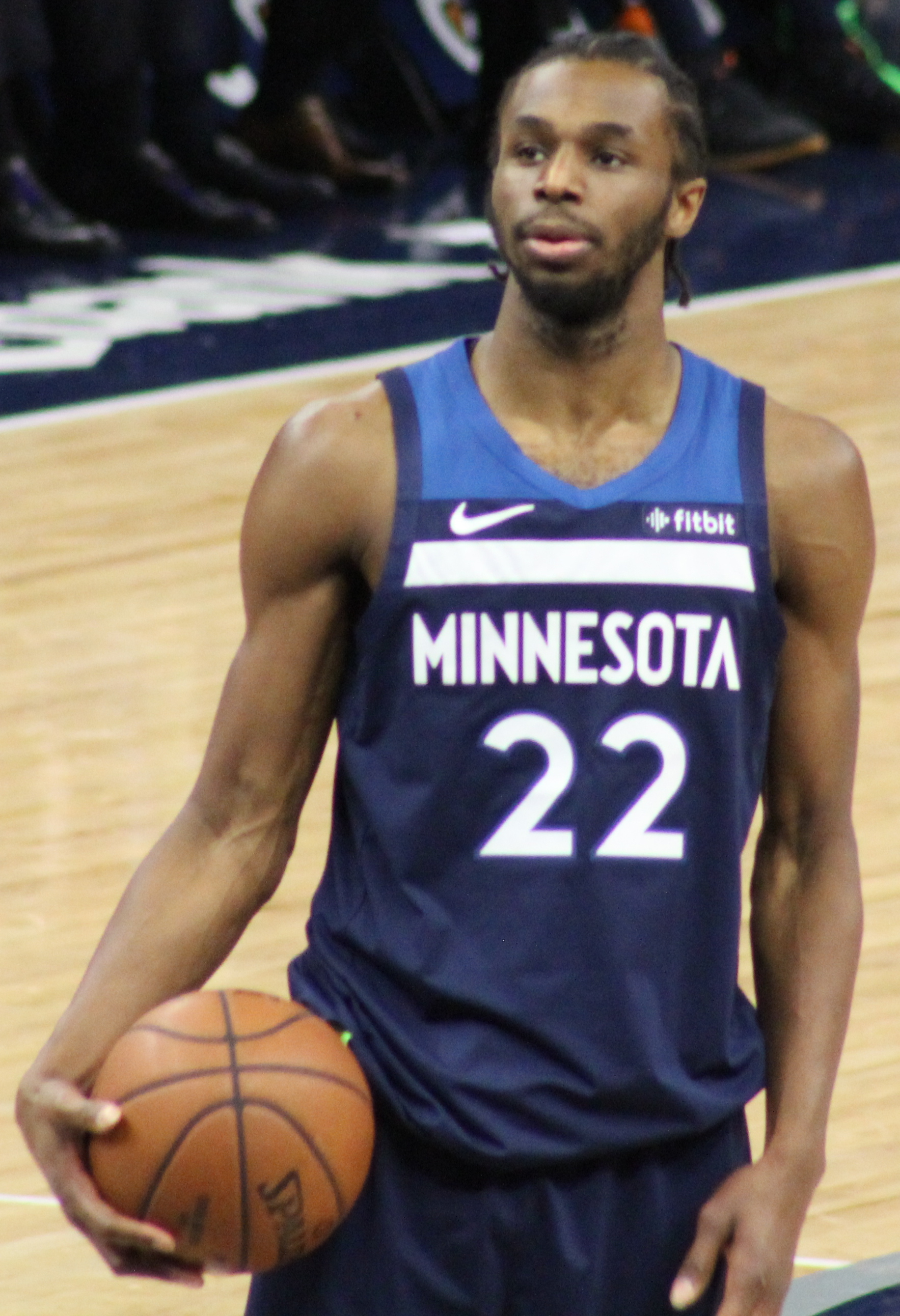
Andrew Wiggins

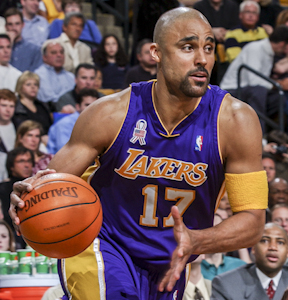
Rick Fox

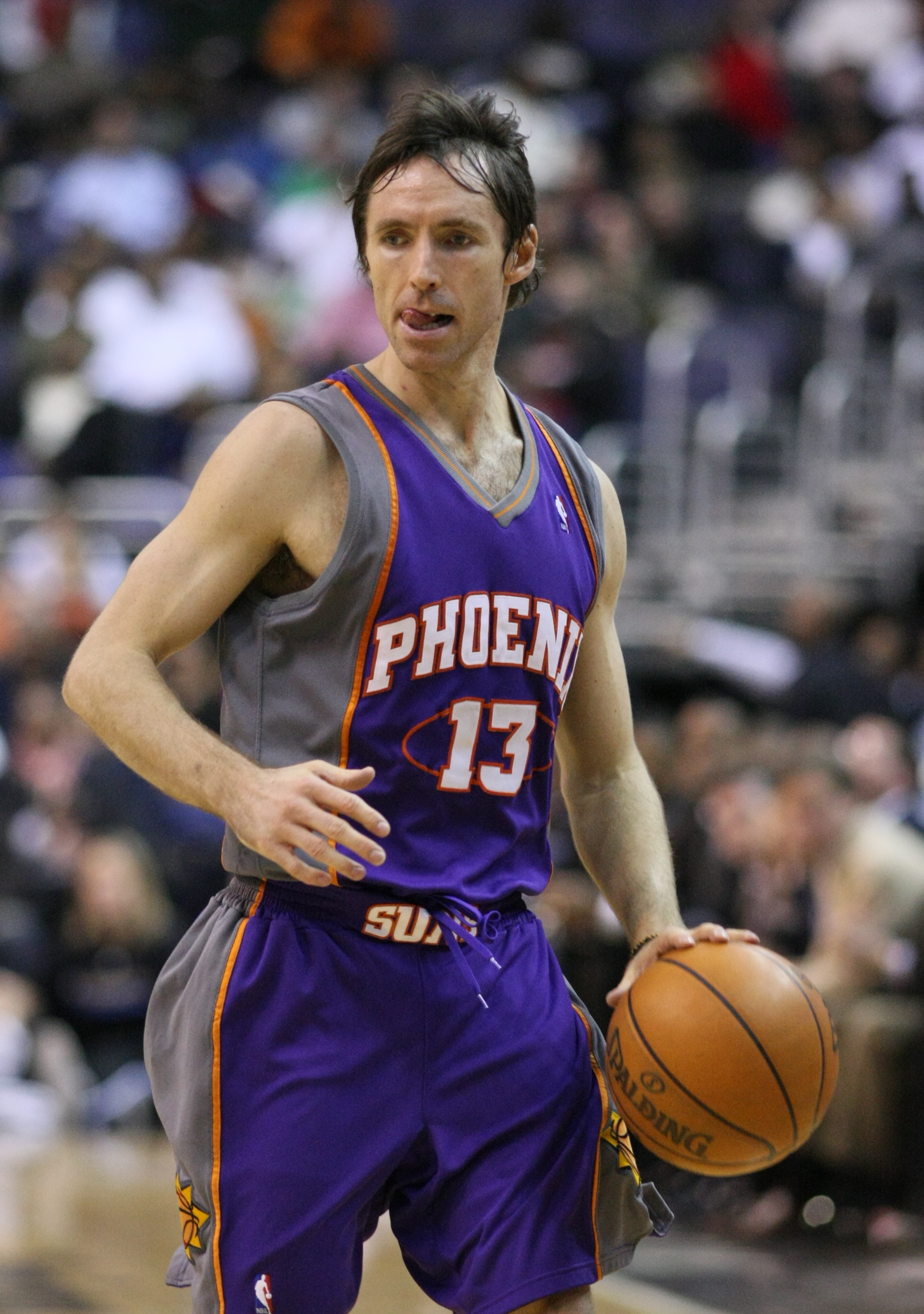
Steve Nash

- Nickeil Alexander-Walker (born 1998)
- Dalano Banton (born 1999)
- RJ Barrett (born 2000)
- Chris Boucher (born 1993)
- Dillon Brooks (born 1996)
- Brandon Clarke (born 1996)
- Luguentz Dort (born 1999)
- Zach Edey (born 2002)
- Shai Gilgeous-Alexander (born 1998)
- Caleb Houstan (born 2003)
- A.J. Lawson (born 2000)
- Bennedict Mathurin (born 2002)
- Emanuel Miller (born 2000)
- Leonard Miller (born 2003)
- Jamal Murray (born 1997)
- Andrew Nembhard (born 2000)
- Ryan Nembhard (born 2003)
- Kelly Olynyk (born 1991)
- Olivier-Maxence Prosper (born 2002)
- Will Riley (born 2006)
- Jackson Rowe (born 1997)
- Shaedon Sharpe (born 2003)
- Andrew Wiggins (born 1995)

Current WNBA players

- Kia Nurse (born 1996)

Playing in overseas leagues

- Caleb Agada (born 1994)
- Kyle Alexander (born 1996)
- Khem Birch (born 1992)
- Oshae Brissett (born 1998)
- Marcus Carr (born 1999)
- Tyler Ennis (born 1994)
- Cory Joseph (born 1991)
- Trey Lyles (born 1995)
- Elijah Mitrou-Long (born 1996)
- Andrew Nicholson (born 1989)
- Nick Ongenda (born 2000)
- Ari Rosenberg (born 1964)
- Jackson Rowe (born 1997)
- Marial Shayok (born 1995)
- Simisola Shittu (born 1999)
- Lindell Wigginton (born 1998)

Playing in other North American professional leagues

- Sim Bhullar (born 1992), notable as the first person of Indian descent to play in the NBA

Coaches

- Kevin Pangos (born 1993)
- Jay Triano (born 1958), first Canadian-born coach

Former NCAA Division I players awaiting professional play

- Nirra Fields (born 1993)
- Ruth Hamblin (born 1994)
- Kyle Wiltjer (born 1992)

Retired

- Jordan Adams (born 1981)
- Norm Baker (1923–1989), inducted into Canadian Basketball Hall of Fame in 1979
- Rowan Barrett (born 1972)
- Hank Biasatti (1922–1996), inducted into the Canadian Basketball Hall of Fame in 2001
- Ron Crevier (born 1958)
- Samuel Dalembert (born 1981)
- Stacey Dales (born 1979), former WNBA player; currently a host on the NFL Network
- Rick Fox (born 1969), won three NBA Championship rings in 2000, 2001 and 2002 as a member of the Los Angeles Lakers
- Stewart Granger (born 1961)
- Lars Hansen (born 1954)
- Bob Houbregs (1932–2014), inducted into the Basketball Hall of fame in 1987
- Todd MacCulloch (born 1976)
- Jamaal Magloire (born 1978)
- James Naismith (1861–1939), teacher; invented the game of basketball
- Steve Nash (born 1974), 2005, 2006 NBA MVP, 2007 MVP runner-up
- Dwight Powell (born 1991)
- Leo Rautins (born 1960)
- Mike Smrek (born 1962)
- Gino Sovran (1924–2016)
- Tristan Thompson (born 1991)
- Ernie Vandeweghe (1928–2014)
- Bill Wennington (born 1963), won three championships with the Chicago Bulls (1996, 1997 and 1998)
- Jim Zoet (born 1953)

== Biathlon ==
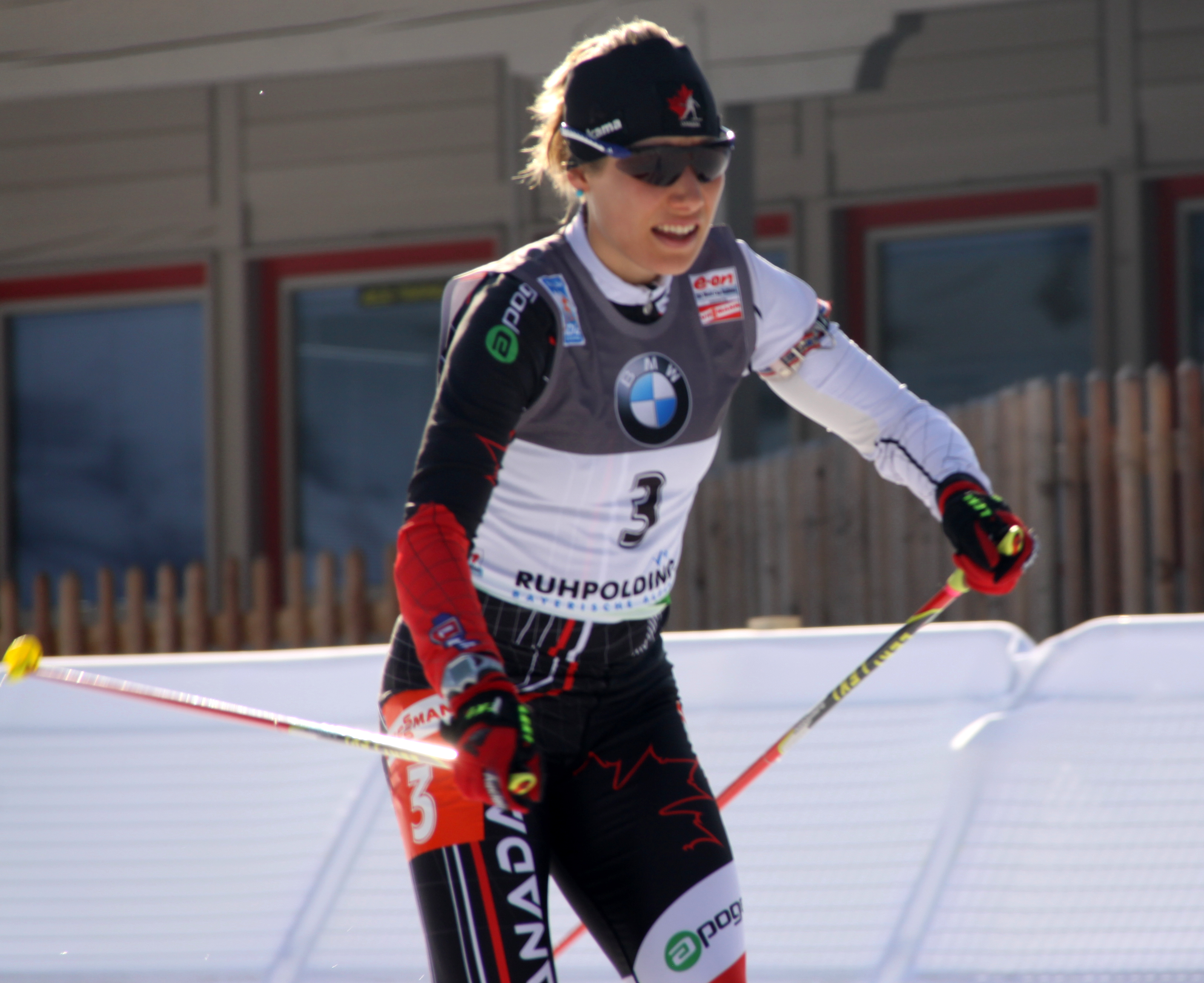
Zina Kocher

- Myriam Bédard (born 1969), Olympic gold medallist
- Zina Kocher (born 1982)

== Bobsleigh ==
- Lascelles Brown (born 1974), Olympic silver medal, 2006
- Vic Emery (born 1933), Olympic gold medal, 1964
- Kaillie Humphries (born 1985), Olympic gold medal, 2010
- Pierre Lueders (born 1970), Olympic gold medal, 1998 and silver medal, 2006
- David MacEachern (born 1967), Olympic gold medal, 1998
- Heather Moyse (born 1978), Olympic gold medal, 2010

== Boxing ==
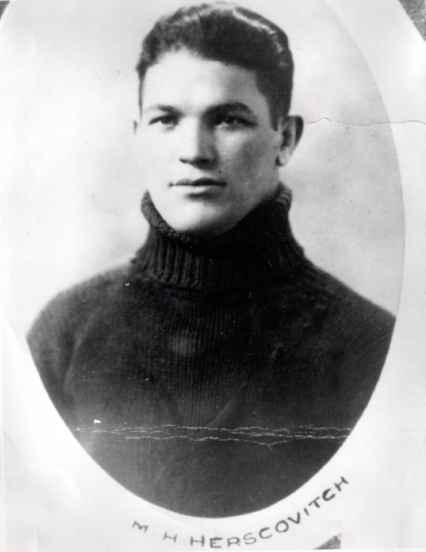
Moe Herscovitch

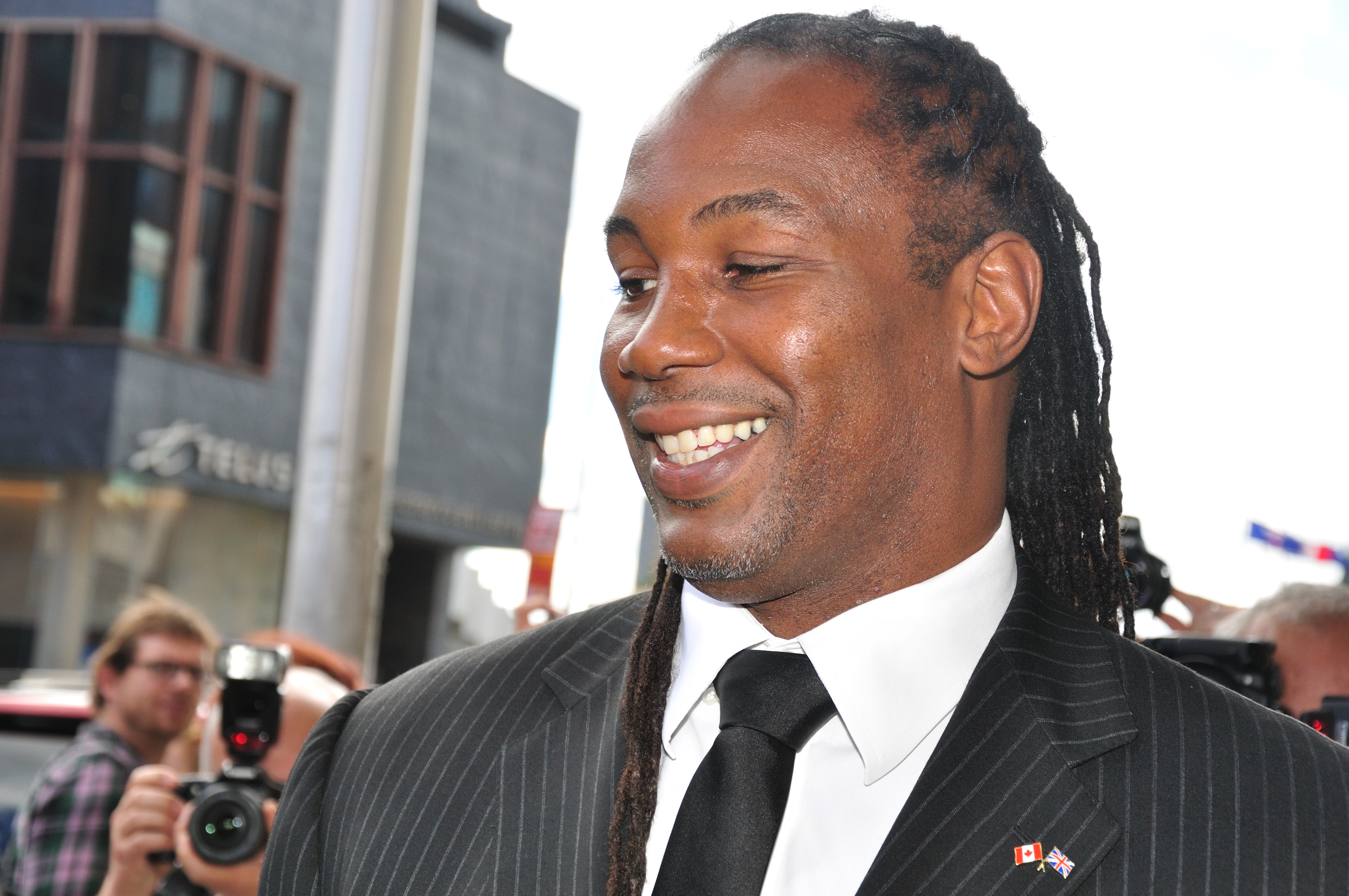
Lennox Lewis

Sammy Luftspring

- Trevor Berbick (1954–2006), former WBC heavyweight champion
- Maxie Berger (1917–2000), world champion junior welterweight
- Tommy Burns (1881–1955), world heavyweight boxing champion
- George Chuvalo (born 1937), heavyweight, five-time Canadian heavyweight champion and two-time world heavyweight title challenger, Ontario Sports Hall of Fame
- Willie DeWitt (born 1961), heavyweight
- Yvon Durelle (1929–2007), middleweight, light heavyweight, and heavyweight
- Al Foreman (1904–1954), won the Canadian lightweight title, British Boxing Board of Control British lightweight title, and British Empire lightweight title
- Freddy Fuller, light welterweight
- Arturo Gatti (1972–2009), former WBC world Super Lightweight champion
- Otis Grant (born 1967), WBC Super Middleweight international champion
- Moe Herscovitch (1897–1969), middleweight, Olympic bronze medal winner
- Kirk Johnson (born 1972), heavyweight
- Sam Langford (1886–1956), lightweight, welterweight, middleweight, light heavyweight, and heavyweight
- Mark Leduc (1962–2009), light welterweight
- Lennox Lewis (born 1965), grew up in Canada; competed for Canada in the Olympics in 1988, winning a gold medal
- Eric Lucas (born 1971), former WBC supermiddleweight world champion (1999–2001)
- Sammy Luftspring (1916–2000), welterweight boxing champion, Canada's Sports Hall of Fame and the Ontario Sports Hall of Fame
- Steve Molitor (born 1980), former IBF Super Bantamweight champion, record of 33–3 (12 KOs) as of September 2012
- Tokunbo Olajide (born 1976), light middleweight boxer
- Jean Pascal (born 1982), former IBO, WBC, Ring Magazine Light Heavyweight Champion of the World
- Donovan Ruddock (born 1963), heavyweight
- Bert Schneider (1897–1986), welterweight, Olympic gold medal winner
- Shane Sutcliffe (born 1975), Canadian former heavyweight champion, defeated former world champion "Neon" Leon Spinks by 8-round decision in 1994

== Cricket ==
- Ashish Bagai (born 1982)
- Ian Billcliff (born 1972)
- Rizwan Cheema (born 1978)
- John Davison (born 1970)
- Navneet Dhaliwal (born 1988)
- Nikhil Dutta (born 1994)
- Romesh Eranga (born 1985)
- Jeremy Gordon (born 1987)
- Dillon Heyliger (born 1989)
- Abraash Khan (born 1998)
- Nicholas Kirton (born 1998)
- Nitish Kumar (born 1994)
- Junaid Siddiqui (born 1985)
- Ravinderpal Singh (born 1988)
- Hamza Tariq (born 1990)
- Rodrigo Thomas (born 1991)
- Srimantha Wijeratne (born 1989)
- Saad Bin Zafar (born 1986)

== Cross-country skiing ==
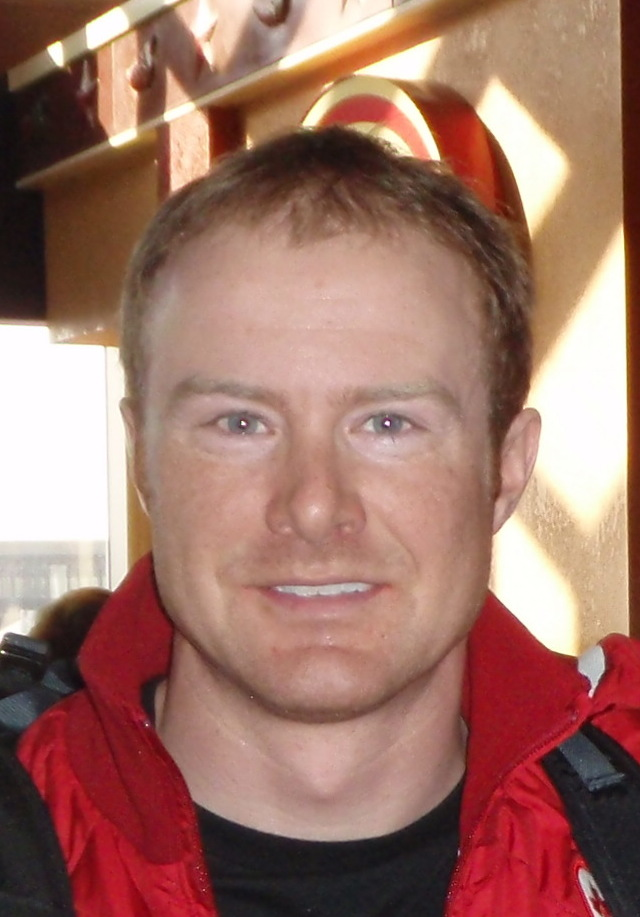
Drew Goldsack

- Shirley Firth (1953–2013)
- Drew Goldsack (born 1981), cross country skier, 2x Olympian
- Brian McKeever (born 1979), multiple Paralympic gold and silver medals
- Robin McKeever (born 1973), multiple Paralympic gold and silver medals
- Esther Miller (born 1957)
- Beckie Scott (born 1974), Olympic gold medal, 2002
- Irvin Servold (born 1932)

== CrossFit ==
- Jeffrey Adler (born 1994)
- Brent Fikowski (born 1991)
- Emma Lawson (born 2005)
- Patrick Vellner (born 1990)

== Curling ==
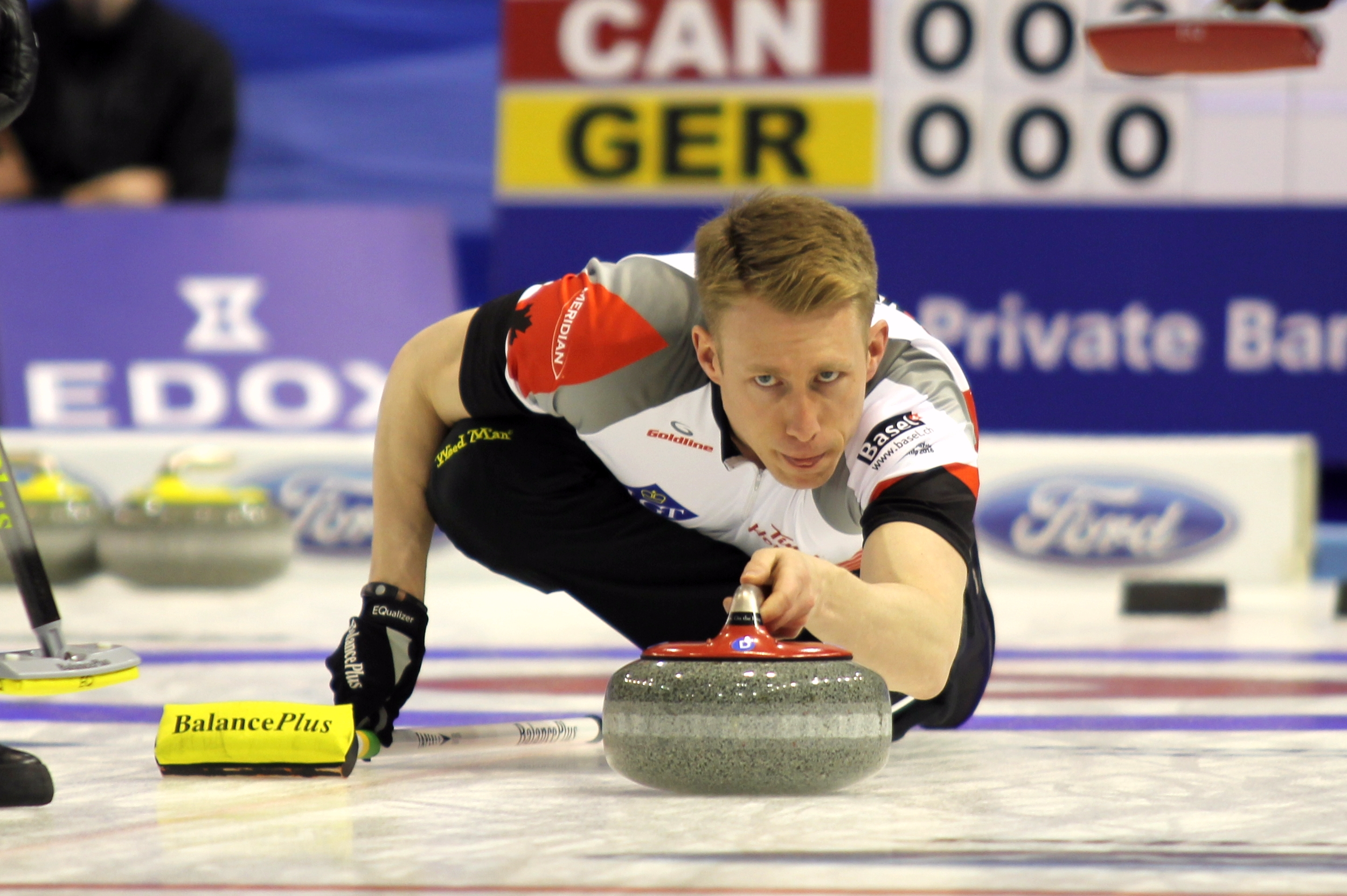
Marc Kennedy

- Sherry Anderson (born 1964)
- Dawn Askin (born 1980)
- Matt Baldwin (1926–2023)
- Cheryl Bernard (born 1966)
- Jan Betker (born 1960)
- Suzanne Birt (born 1981)
- Marilyn Bodogh (born 1955)
- Terry Braunstein (born 1939), World Championship silver medalist
- Kerry Burtnyk (born 1958)
- Garnet Campbell (1927–2011)
- Chelsea Carey (born 1984)
- Jim Cotter (born 1974)
- Andrea Crawford
- Mark Dacey (born 1966)
- Lyall Dagg (1929–1975)
- Mabel DeWare (1926–2022)
- Don Duguid (born 1935)
- John Epping (born 1983)
- Randy Ferbey (born 1959)
- Rick Folk (born 1950)
- Rob Fowler (born 1975)
- Kerry Galusha (born 1977)
- Hec Gervais (1933–1997)
- Alison Goring (born 1963)
- Ab Gowanlock (1900–1988)
- Brad Gushue (born 1980)
- Al Hackner (born 1954)
- Jenn Hanna (born 1980)
- Mike Harris (born 1967)
- Richard Hart (born 1968)
- Ben Hebert (born 1983)
- Guy Hemmings (born 1962)
- Amber Holland (born 1974)
- Rachel Homan (born 1989)
- Heather Houston
- Glenn Howard (born 1962)
- Russ Howard (born 1956)
- Gordon Hudson (1894–1959)
- Brad Jacobs (born 1985)
- Colleen Jones (1959–2025)
- Jennifer Jones (born 1974)
- Marc Kennedy (born 1982)
- Cathy King (born 1959)
- Shannon Kleibrink (born 1968)
- Jamie Koe (born 1977)
- Kevin Koe (born 1975)
- Brent Laing (born 1978)
- Connie Laliberte (born 1960)
- Penny LaRocque
- Marie-France Larouche (born 1980)
- Kelley Law (born 1966)
- Kaitlyn Lawes (born 1988)
- Stefanie Lawton (born 1980)
- Ed Lukowich (born 1946)
- Jack MacDuff (born 1950)
- Murray Macneill (1877–1951)
- Cliff Manahan (1888–1970)
- Kevin Martin (born 1966)
- Greg McAulay (born 1960)
- Krista McCarville (born 1982)
- Mike McEwen (born 1980)
- Joyce McKee (1933–1999)
- Orest Meleschuk (born 1940)
- Jean-Michel Ménard (born 1976)
- Sherry Middaugh (born 1966)
- Wayne Middaugh (born 1967)
- Marj Mitchell (1948–1983)
- Linda Moore (born 1954)
- John Morris (born 1978)
- Barry Naimark (1932–2004), world champion
- Dave Nedohin (born 1973)
- Heather Nedohin (born 1975)
- Ron Northcott (1935–2023)
- Jill Officer (born 1975)
- Scott Patterson (1969–2004)
- Vic Peters (1955–2016)
- Vera Pezer (born 1939)
- Ernie Richardson (born 1931)
- Pat Ryan (born 1955)
- Pat Sanders
- Craig Savill (born 1978)
- Sandra Schmirler (1963–2000)
- Kelly Scott (born 1977)
- Julie Skinner (born 1968)
- Heather Smith-Dacey (born 1972)
- Lindsay Sparkes (born 1950)
- Jeff Stoughton (born 1963)
- Billy Walsh (1917–1971)
- Ed Werenich (born 1947)
- Pappy Wood (1888–1978)

== Cycling ==
- Steve Bauer (born 1959)
- Hugo Donais (born 1983), mountain bike, four-cross and BMX cyclist
- Derek Gee (born 1997), racing cyclist
- Leah Goldstein (born 1969), Canadian-born Israeli professional road racing cyclist winner of the Race Across America, World Bantamweight Kickboxing Champion, and Israel Duathlon national champion
- Ryder Hesjedal (born 1980), 7th overall at the 2010 Tour de France, winner of 2012 Giro d'Italia
- Andreas Hestler (born 1970)
- Clara Hughes (born 1972), two-sport athlete, six Olympic medals total
- Alison Sydor (born 1966)

== Disc sports ==
- Ken Westerfield (born 1947), disc sport (Frisbee) pioneer, athlete, showman, promoter

== Fencing ==
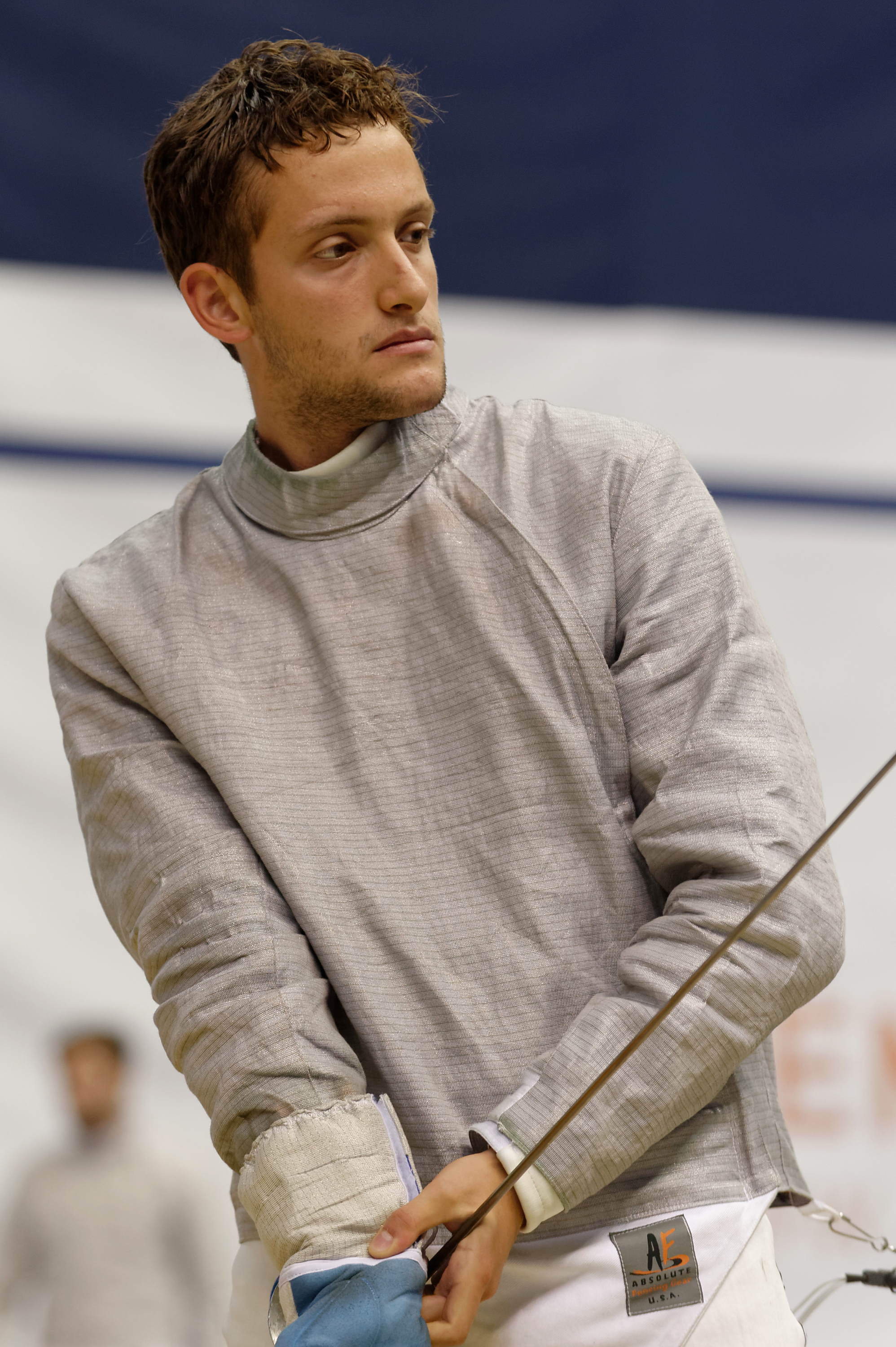
Shaul Gordon

- Peter Bakonyi (1933–1997), Hungarian-born Canadian Olympic foil and épée fencer
- Marc-Antoine Blais Bélanger (born 1995), épée
- Alex Cai (born 2000), foil
- Alanna Goldie (born 1994), foil, 2015 Pan American Games gold medal in team foil
- Shaul Gordon (born 1994), sabre, three Pan American Games medals
- Eleanor Harvey (born 1995), foil; won gold medal at the 2015 Pan American Games in women's team foil event
- Bertram Markus (1899–1900), foil and épée
- Rhoda Martin (1919–1998), foil
- Eli Schenkel (born 1992), foil
- Shelley Steiner (born 1961), foil, Olympic fencer
- Igor Tikhomirov (born 1963), épée
- Maximilien Van Haaster (born 1992), foil, bronze medal at the 2013 Pan American Fencing Championships
- Gerry Wiedel (1933–2023), foil and épée

== Figure skating ==
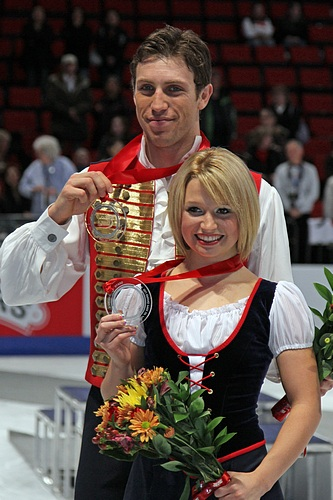
Kirsten Moore-Towers and Dylan Moscovitch

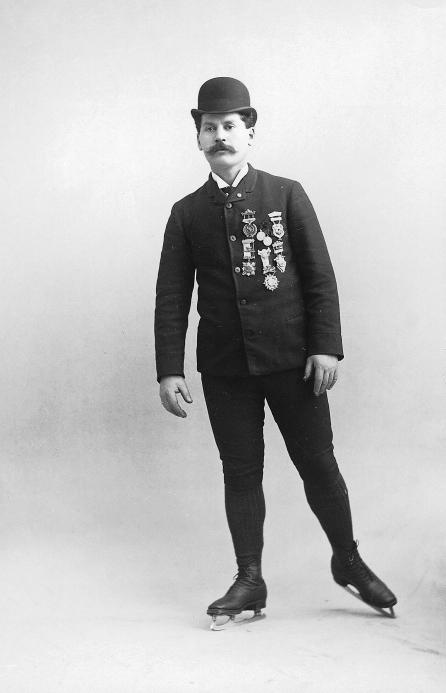
Louis Rubenstein

- Barbara Berezowski (born 1954)
- Stan Bohonek (born 1952)
- Shae-Lynn Bourne (born 1976) and Victor Kraatz (born 1971), ice dancing, World Champions, 2003
- Kurt Browning (born 1966)
- Patrick Chan (born 1990)
- Toller Cranston (1949–2015)
- Lloyd Eisler (born 1963)
- Donald Jackson (born 1940)
- Victor Kraatz (born 1971)
- Elizabeth Manley (born 1965)
- Kirsten Moore-Towers (born 1992)
- Dylan Moscovitch (born 1984), Olympic silver medallist pair skater
- Brian Orser (born 1961)
- Cynthia Phaneuf (born 1988)
- Jennifer Robinson (born 1976)
- Joannie Rochette (born 1986)
- Louis Rubenstein (1861–1931), pre-Olympic World Championship gold, World Figure Skating Hall of Fame
- Jamie Salé (born 1977) and David Pelletier (born 1974), pairs, gold medal 2002 Winter Olympics
- Emanuel Sandhu (born 1980)
- Barbara Ann Scott (1928–2012), Olympic gold medal
- Elvis Stojko (born 1972)
- Barbara Underhill (born 1963) and Paul Martini (born 1960), pairs, World Champions, 1984
- Tessa Virtue (born 1989) and Scott Moir (born 1987), ice dancing, gold medal 2010 Winter Olympics, Ice Dancing Silver Medal 2014 Winter Olympics, ice dancing gold medal 2018 Winter Olympics
- Barbara Wagner (born 1938) and Robert Paul (1937–2024), pairs
- Tracey Wainman (born 1967)
- Constance Wilson-Samuel (1908–1963)

== Football ==
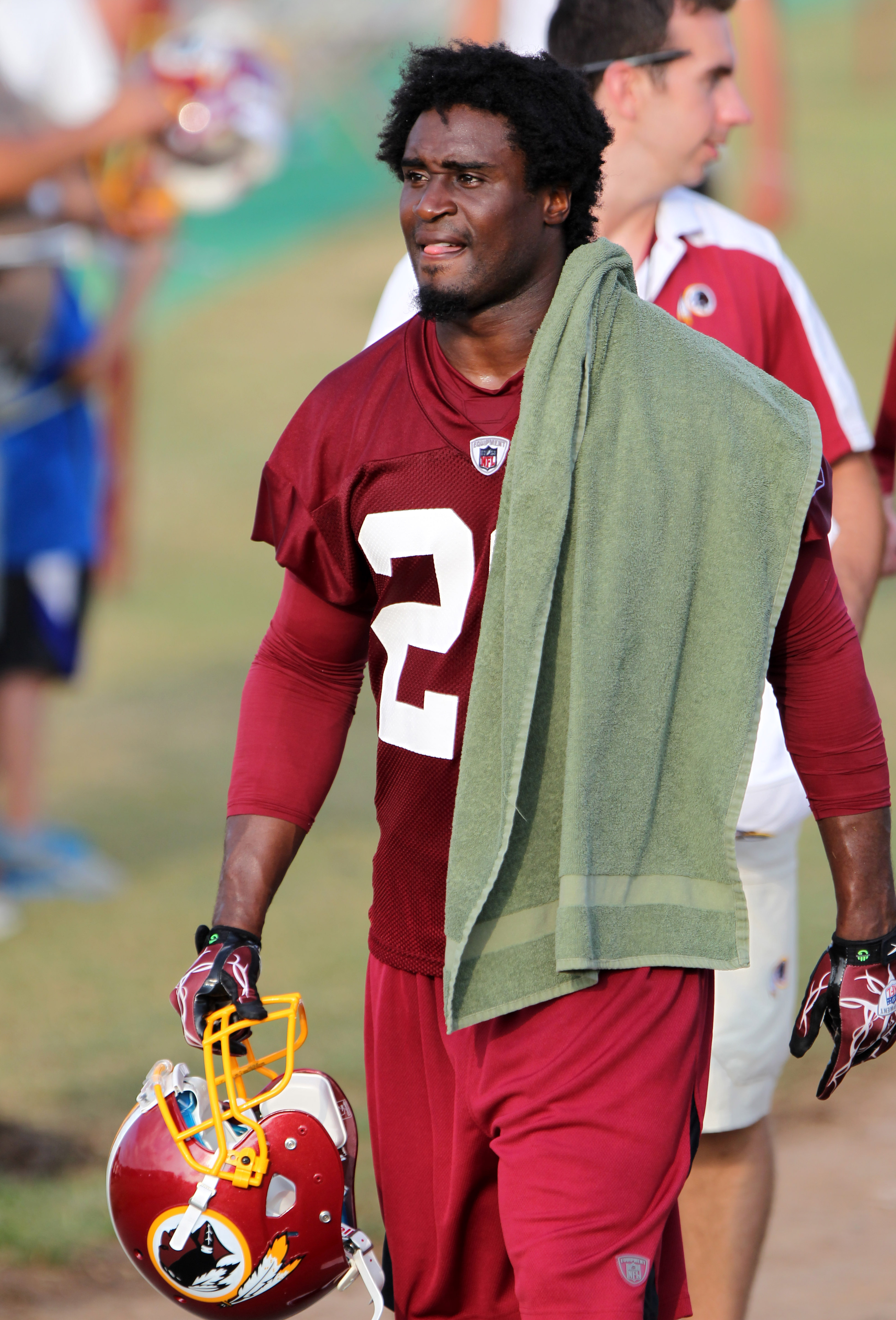
Oshiomogho Atogwe

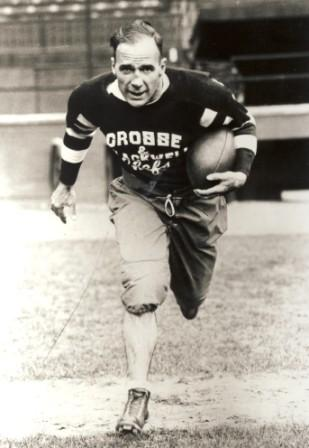
Lionel Conacher

- Jean Philippe Abraham (born 1982), Edmonton Eskimos
- Roger Aldag (born 1953), retired CFL offensive lineman
- Oshiomogho Atogwe (born 1981), Philadelphia Eagles free safety
- Jamie Boreham (born 1978), retired CFL kicker
- Doug Brown (born 1974), retired CFL and NFL defensive tackle
- Nate Burleson (born 1981), Detroit Lions wide receiver
- Noah Cantor (born 1971), DT, Canadian Football League
- Steve Christie (born 1967), NFL placekicker
- Pinball Clemons (born 1965), current Vice Chair for Toronto Argonauts, born in the United States
- Lionel Conacher (1900–1954), former CFL halfback
- Royal Copeland (1924–2011)
- Peter Dalla Riva (born 1945)
- Vince Danielsen (born 1971), retired CFL quarterback
- Jason David (born 1982), New Orleans Saints
- Rocky Dipietro (born 1956)
- Ray Elgaard (born 1959)
- Don Fuell (1938–2024)
- Tony Gabriel (born 1948)
- Russ Jackson (born 1936)
- Teyo Johnson (born 1981), free agent, NFL tight end
- Danny Kepley (born 1953)
- Joe Krol (1919–2008)
- Normie Kwong (1929–2016)
- Rueben Mayes (born 1963), former NFL running back
- Angelo Mosca (1937–2021), retired CFL defensive tackle
- Eddie Murray (born 1956), retired NFL placekicker
- Bronko Nagurski (1908–1990), Chicago Bears legend, member of US Pro Football Hall of Fame
- Wayne Pyne (1917–2004)
- Dave Ridgway (born 1959)
- Mark Rypien (born 1962), former NFL quarterback
- Dave Sapunjis (born 1967)
- Annis Stukus (1914–2006), former CFL player and executive
- Shaun Suisham (born 1981), Pittsburgh Steelers placekicker
- Mike Vanderjagt (born 1970), retired placekicker for several CFL, NFL and Arena league teams
- Troy Westwood (born 1967)

== Golf ==
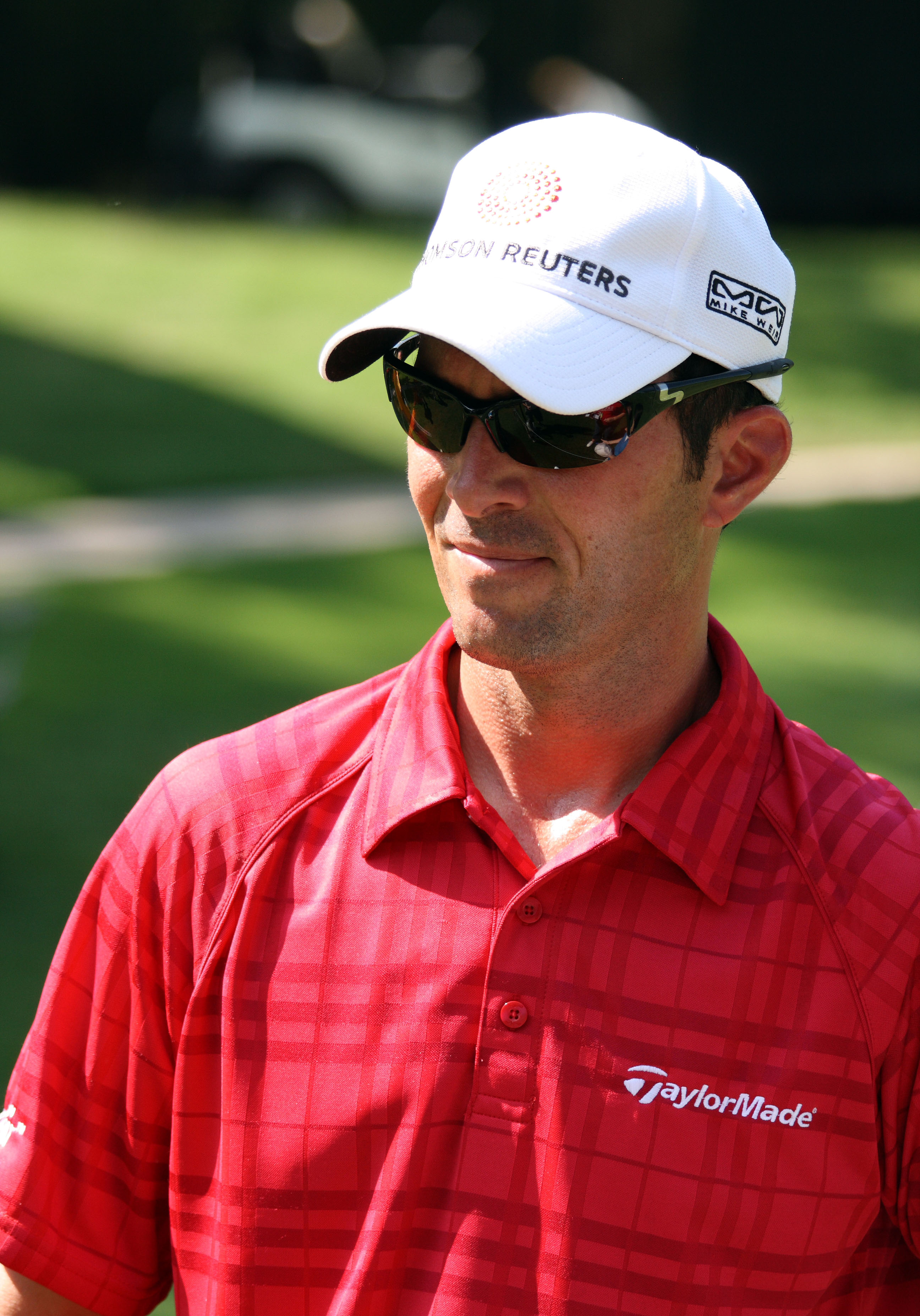
Mike Weir

- Stephen Ames (born 1964)
- Al Balding (1924–2006)
- Dave Barr (born 1952)
- Jocelyne Bourassa (1947–2021)
- Dawn Coe-Jones (1960–2016)
- Corey Conners (born 1992)
- Graham DeLaet (born 1982)
- Gail Graham (born 1964)
- Dan Halldorson (1952–2015)
- Adam Hadwin (born 1987)
- David Hearn (born 1979)
- Brooke Henderson (born 1997)
- Lorie Kane (born 1964)
- George Knudson (1937–1989)
- Stan Leonard (1915–2005)
- Jim Nelford (born 1955)
- Moe Norman (1929–2004)
- Sandra Post (born 1948)
- Ben Silverman (born 1987)
- Sandy Somerville (1903–1991)
- Nick Taylor (born 1988)
- Mike Weir (born 1970)
- Jennifer Wyatt (born 1965)
- Richard "Dick" Zokol (born 1958)

== Gymnastics ==
- Elfi Schlegel (born 1964)
- Isabela Onyshko (born 1998)

== Horse racing and equestrian sports ==
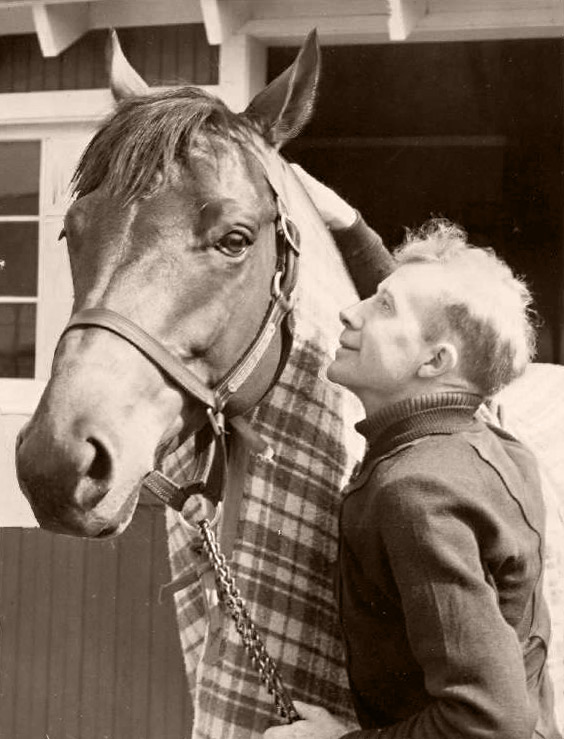
Red Pollard

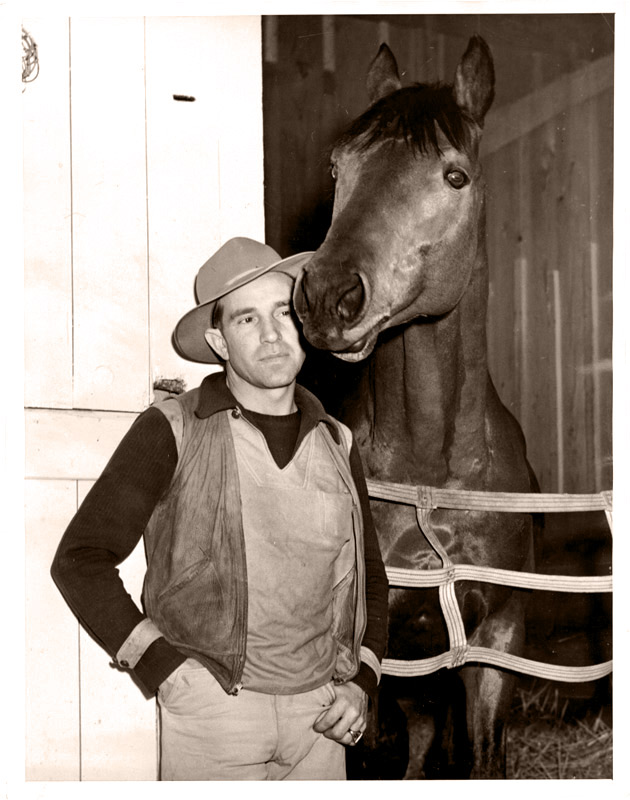
George Woolf

- Ted Atkinson (1916–2005), Hall of Fame jockey
- Russell Baze (born 1958), Hall of Fame jockey; currently #2 winningest jockey in history
- Big Ben, world show-jumping champion
- Billyjojimbob, distinguished aged trotter
- John Campbell (born 1955), harness racing driver
- Dance Smartly, Canadian Triple Crown, Breeders' Cup champion
- Jim Day (born 1946), Olympic equestrian gold medallist, champion thoroughbred trainer
- Laetitia du Couëdic (born 1996), equestrian rider
- Stewart Elliott (born 1965), thoroughbred racing jockey
- Hervé Filion (1940–2017), harness racing driver
- Sandy Hawley (born 1949), Hall of Fame thoroughbred jockey
- John Hayes (1917–1998), harness racing driver
- Johnny Longden (1907–2003), Hall of Fame jockey
- Ian Millar (born 1947), owner and rider of Big Ben
- Nijinsky II, last English Triple Crown winner
- Northern Dancer, Canada's most successful and beloved race horse
- Red Pollard (1909–1981), Seabiscuit's jockey
- Strike Out, harness racing champion
- Ron Turcotte (1941–2025), Hall of Fame jockey of Secretariat
- George Woolf (1910–1946), Hall of Fame jockey

== Ice hockey ==
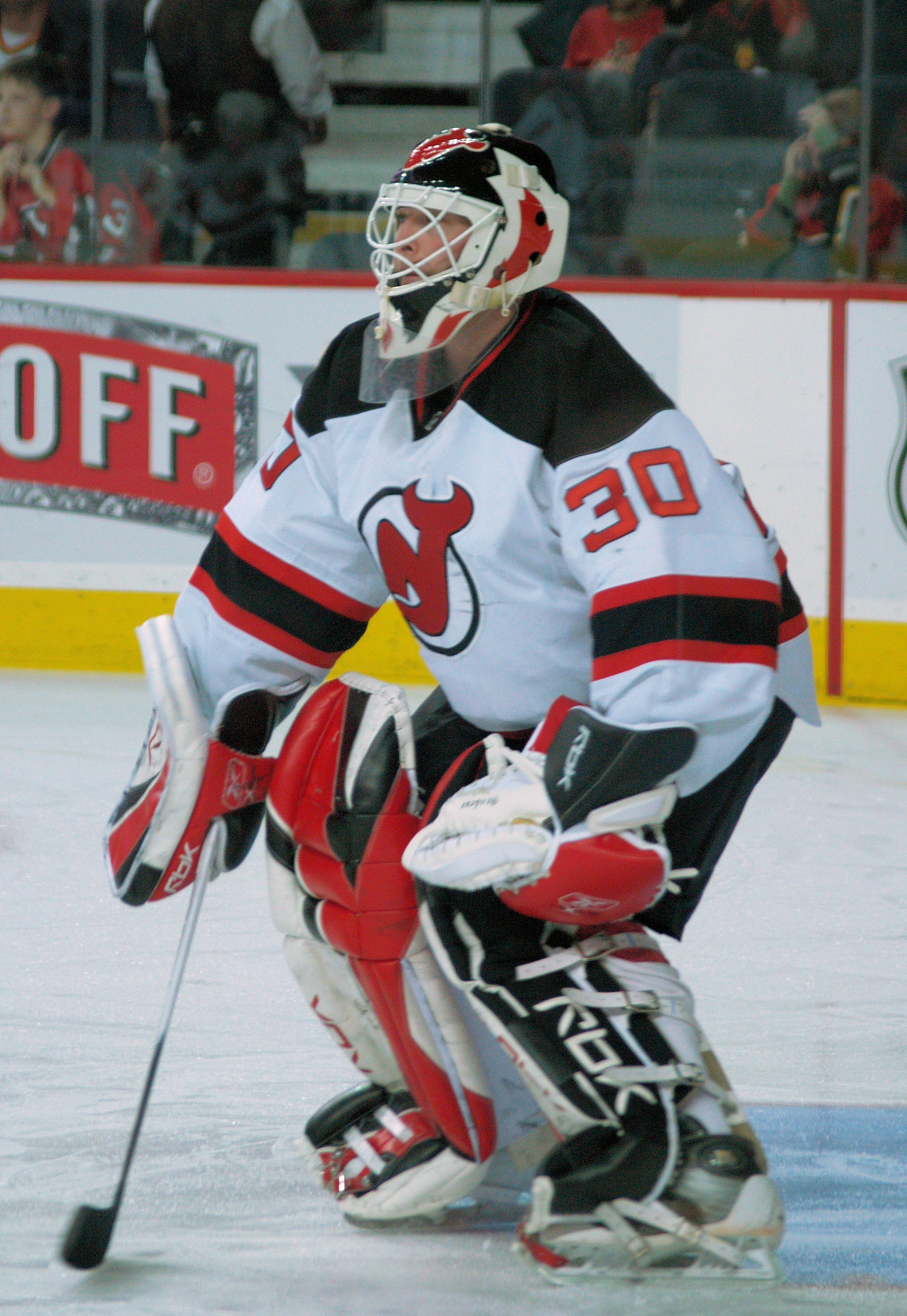
Martin Brodeur

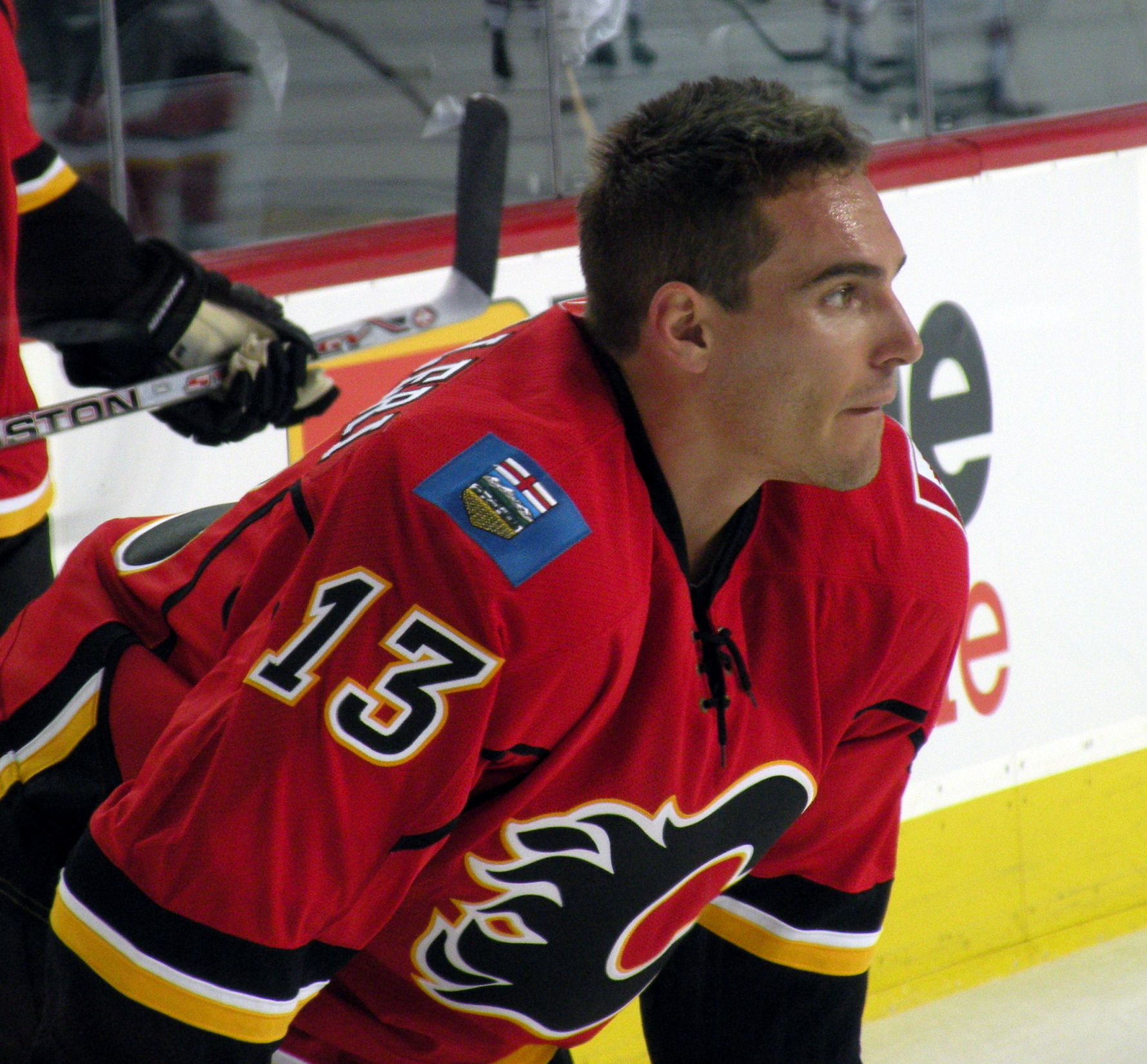
Michael Cammalleri

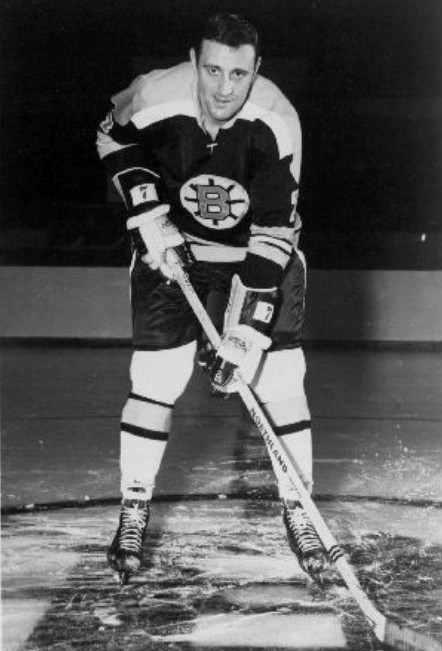
Phil Esposito

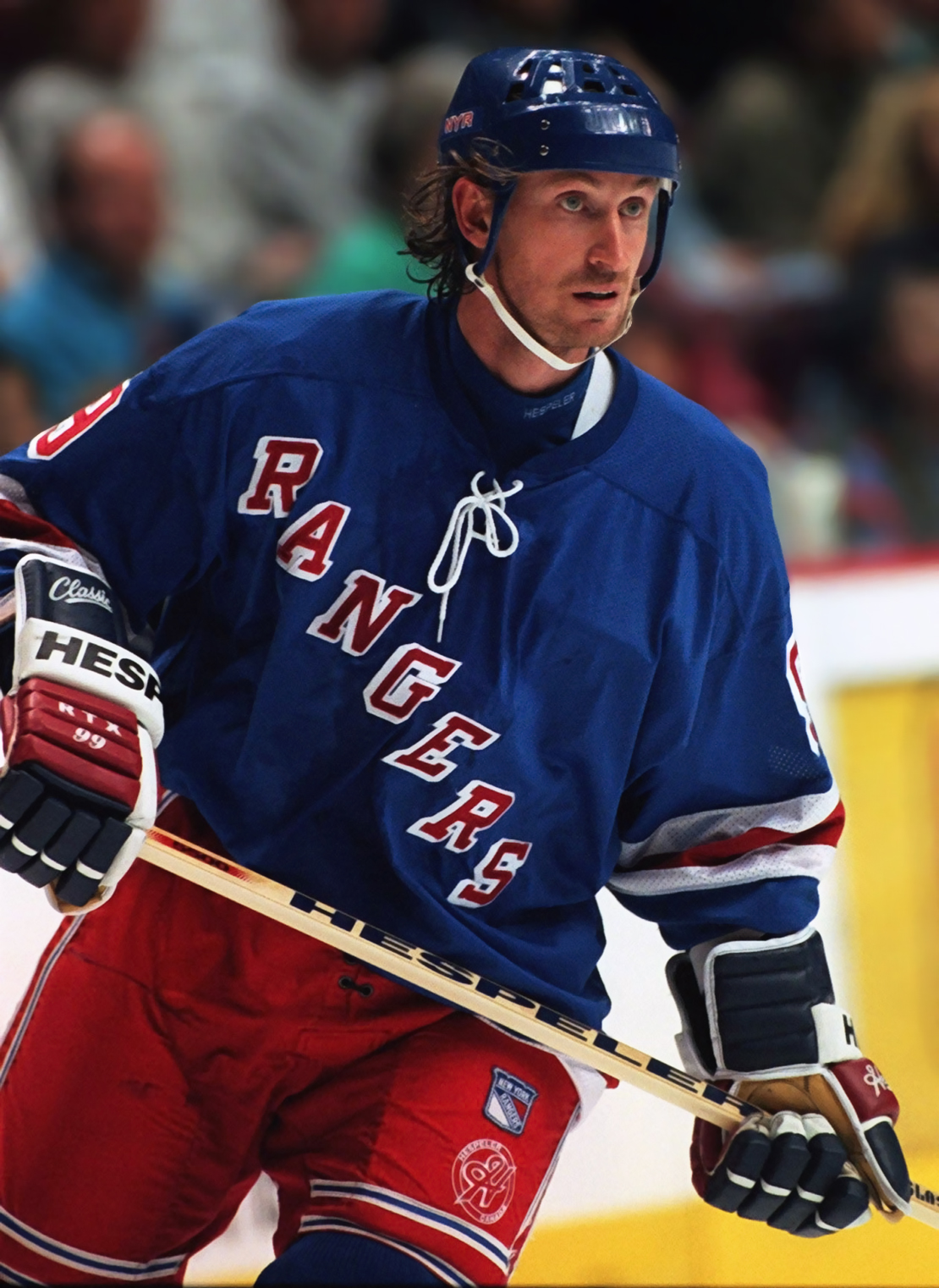
Wayne Gretzky

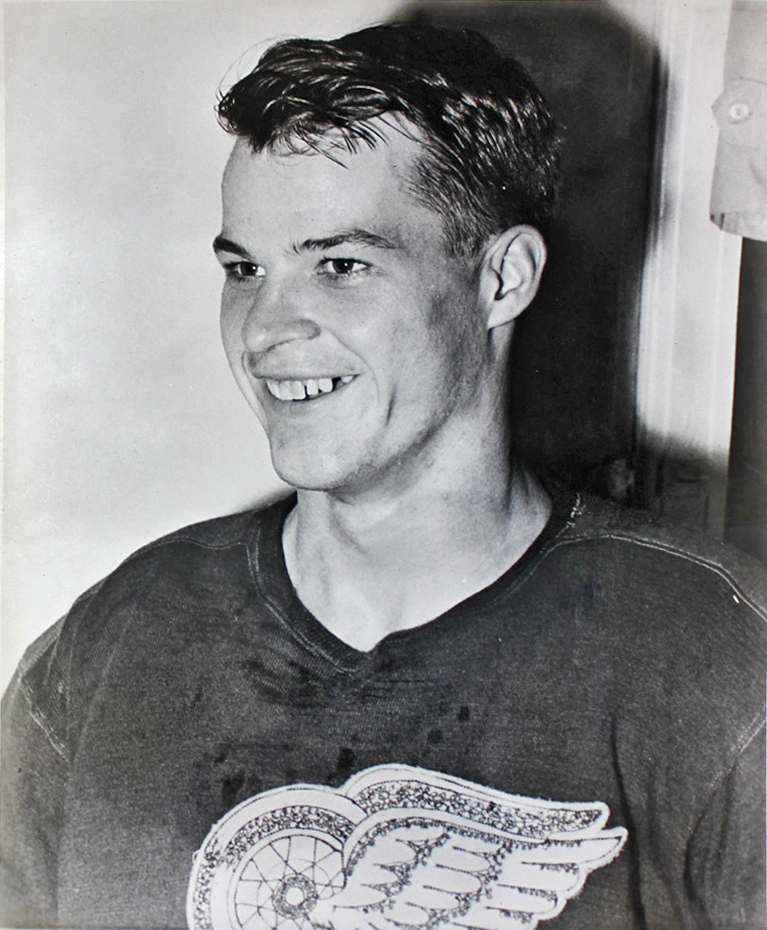
Gordie Howe

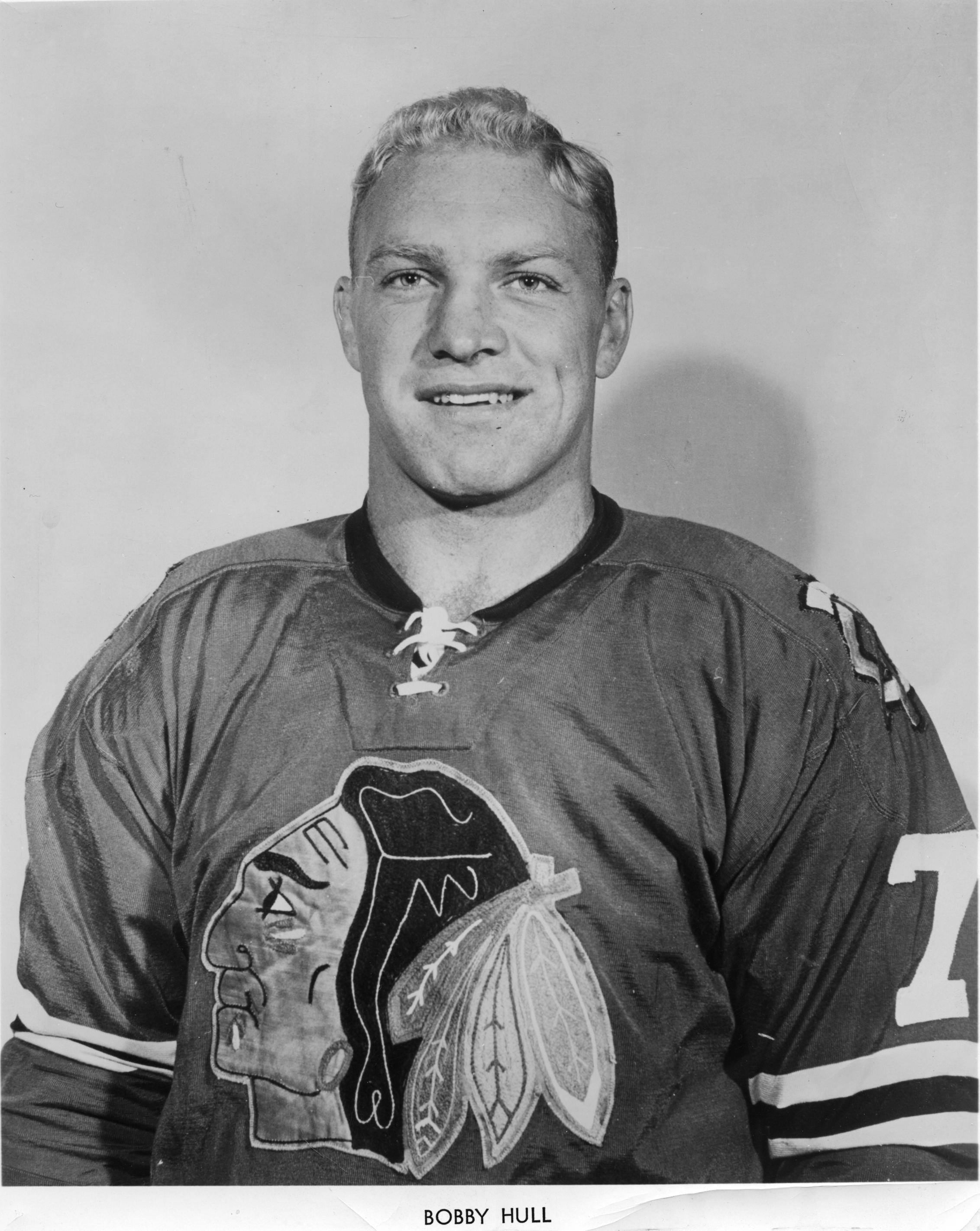
Bobby Hull

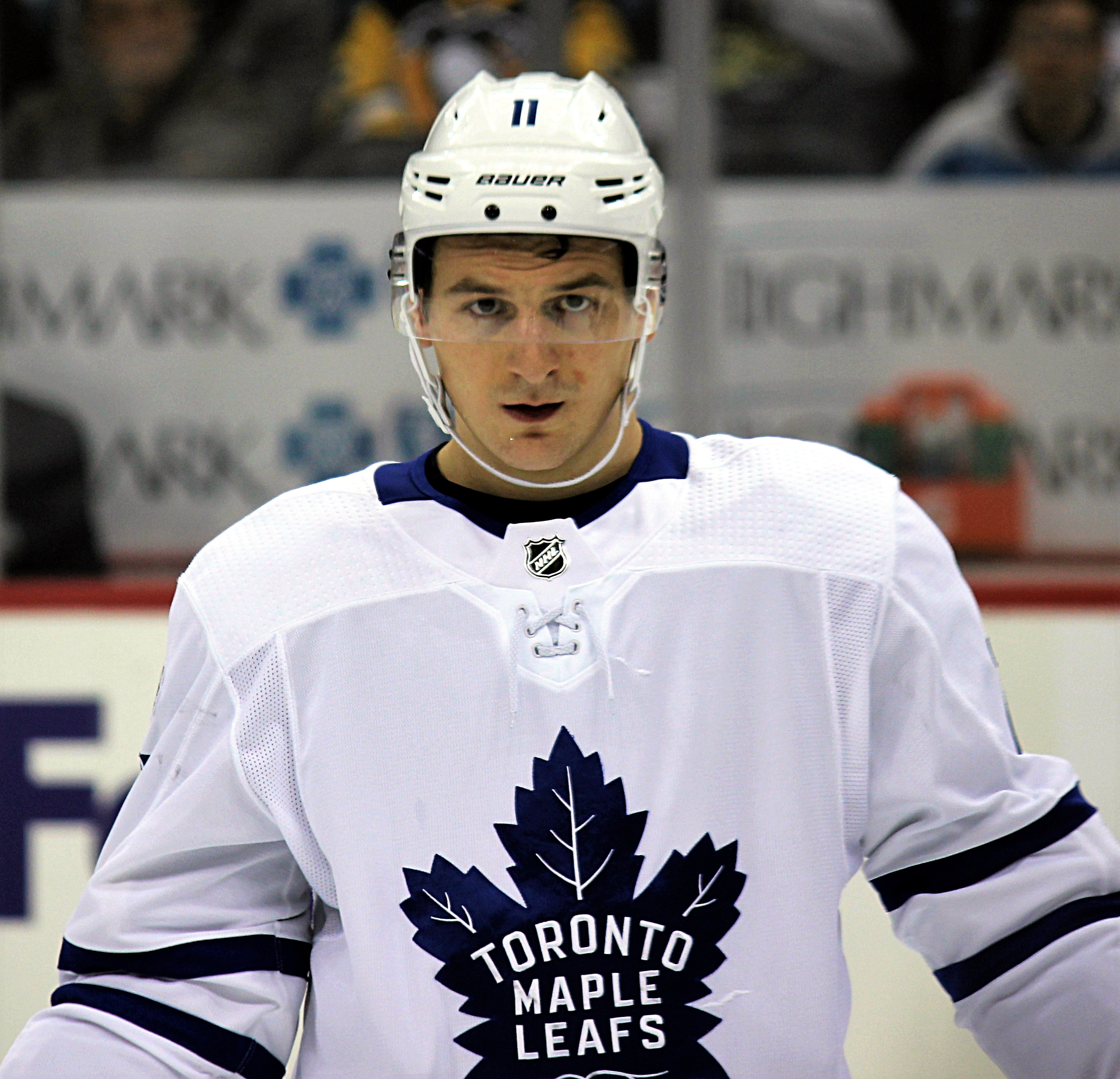
Zach Hyman

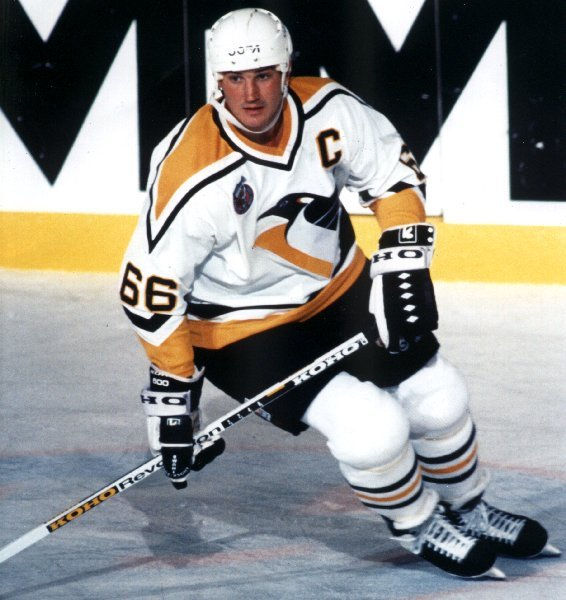
Mario Lemieux

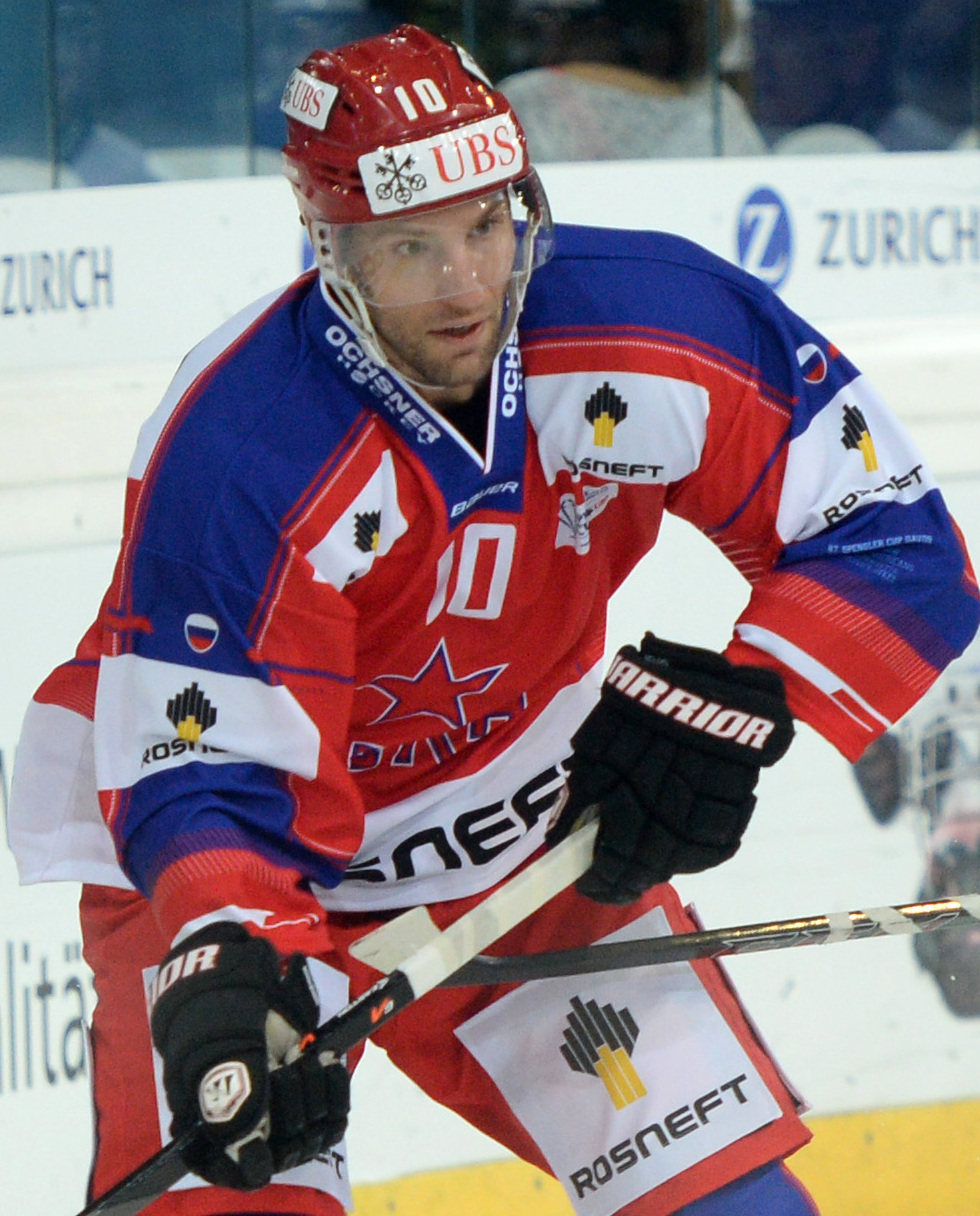
David Nemirovsky

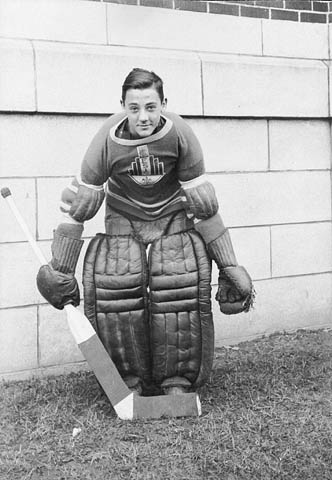
Jacques Plante

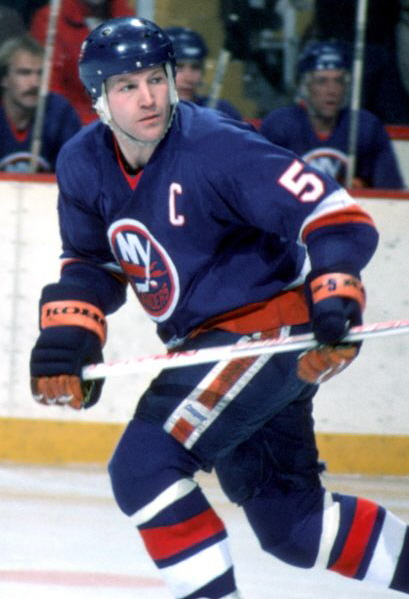
Dennis Potvin

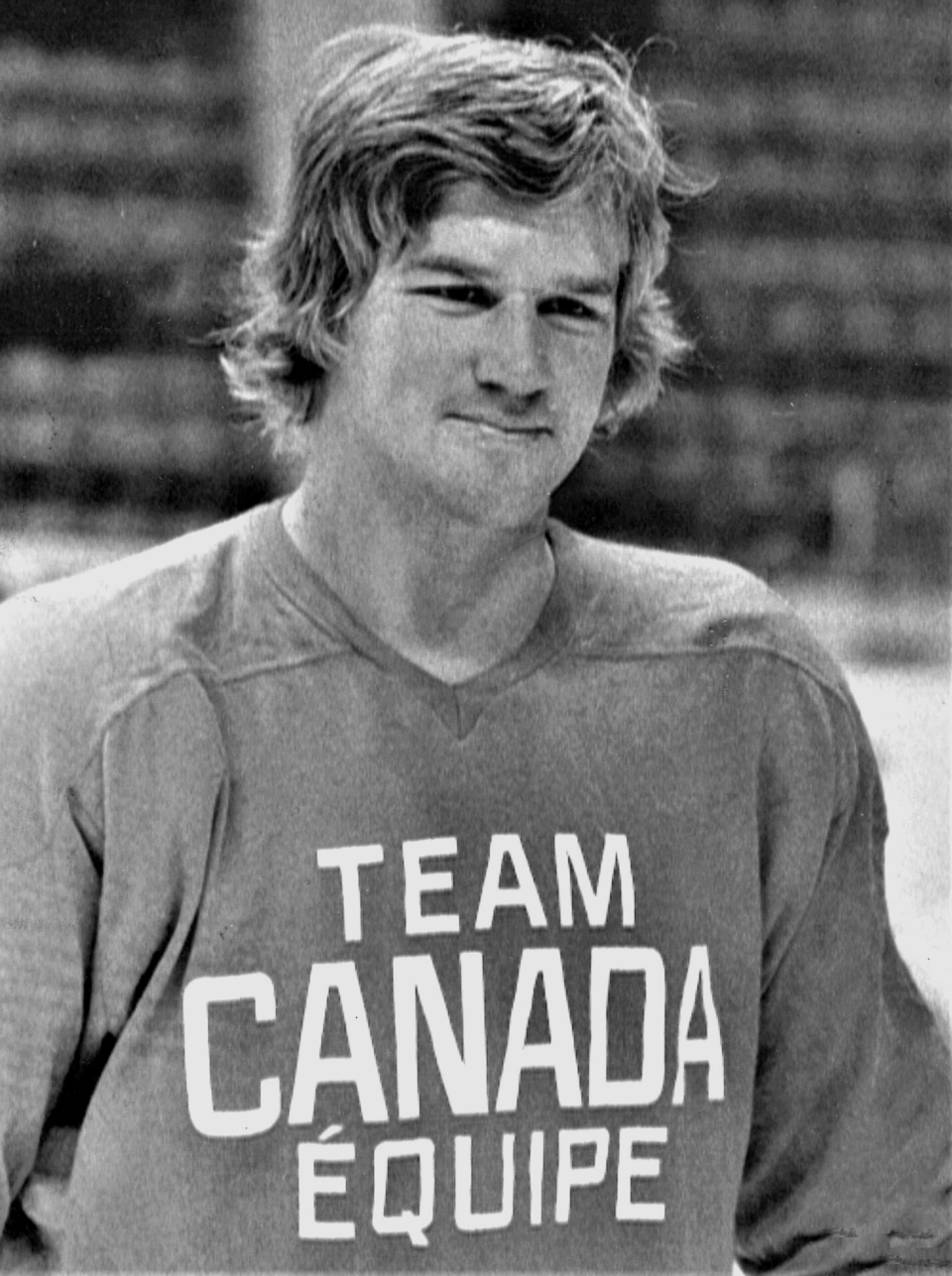
Bobby Orr

- Syl Apps (1915–1998)
- Colin Baustad (born 1969)
- Jean Beliveau (1931–2014), NHL center
- Todd Bertuzzi (born 1975), NHL winger
- Mike Bossy (1957–2022), NHL right wing
- Jennifer Botterill (born 1979), four Olympic medals
- Ray Bourque (born 1960), five-time winner of the James Norris Memorial Trophy
- Daryl Boyle (born 1987)
- Martin Brodeur (born 1972), more NHL wins than any other goaltender
- Ross Brooks (born 1937), NHL goaltender
- Hy Buller (1926–1968), NHL All-Star defenceman
- Michael Cammalleri (born 1982), left wing (Calgary Flames)
- Cassie Campbell (born 1973)
- Ed Chapleau (1884–1932)
- Don Cherry (born 1934)
- Samantha Cogan (born 1997), forward for PWHL Toronto
- Mike Craig (born 1971), NHL forward
- Sidney Crosby (born 1987), NHL center
- Jason Demers (born 1988), NHL defenceman
- Marcel Dionne (born 1951), NHL center
- Steve Dubinsky (born 1970), NHL center
- Matt Duchene (born 1991), NHL center
- Mathew Dumba (born 1994), NHL defenceman
- Bill Durnan (1916–1972), NHL goaltender
- Phil Esposito (born 1942)
- Tony Esposito (1943–2021)
- Mike Fisher (born 1980), Peterborough
- Kaleigh Fratkin (born 1992), professional ice hockey defenseman
- Mark Friedman (born 1995), NHL defenseman
- Danny Gallivan (1917–1993), play-by-play announcer
- Bernie Geoffrion (1931–2006), "Boom-Boom", developed the booming slap shot, second player in NHL history to score 50 goals in a season
- Doug Gilmour (born 1963)
- Claude Giroux (born 1988), Hearst, Ontario
- Danielle Goyette (born 1966)
- Wayne Gretzky (born 1961), "The Great One", holds most NHL scoring records
- George Hainsworth (1893–1950)
- Glenn Hall (1931–2026)
- Gizzy Hart (1901–1964), NHL left wing
- Doug Harvey (1924–1989), seven-time winner of the James Norris Memorial Trophy
- Dany Heatley (born 1981), German-born Canadian NHL winger
- Jayna Hefford (born 1977), five Olympic medals
- Paul Henderson (born 1943), scored winning goal in 1972 Canada/USSR match
- Foster Hewitt (1902–1985), play-by-play announcer
- Corey Hirsch (born 1972), NHL goaltender
- Joshua Ho-Sang (born 1996), forward
- Tim Horton (1930–1974), NHL defenceman
- Bronco Horvath (1930–2019), NHL center
- Gordie Howe (1928–2016), held most NHL scoring records before Gretzky
- Kelly Hrudey (born 1961)
- Jack Hughes (born 2001), NHL center
- Bobby Hull (1939–2023), the "Golden Jet"; first player in the NHL to score more than 50 goals in a season
- Brett Hull (born 1964), Canadian-American star for several teams, son of Bobby Hull
- Zach Hyman (born 1992), NHL ice hockey left wing/center
- Jarome Iginla (born 1977), NHL right wing
- Peter Ing (born 1989), NHL goaltender
- Joe Ironstone (1898–1972), NHL goaltender
- Curtis Joseph (born 1967), Keswick
- Nazem Kadri (born 1990), NHL centre
- Max Kaminsky (1912–1961), NHL centre
- Paul Kariya (born 1974), NHL winger
- Duncan Keith (born 1983)
- Red Kelly (1927–2019)
- Ted Kennedy (1925–2009)
- Dave Keon (born 1940)
- Max Labovitch (1924–2018), NHL right wing
- Reggie Leach (born 1950)
- Guy Lafleur (1951–2022)
- Brendan Leipsic (born 1994), forward
- Mario Lemieux (born 1965), player/owner of the Pittsburgh Penguins
- Devon Levi (born 2001), Northeastern Huskies, Canada men's national junior ice hockey team, goaltender
- Alex "Mine Boy" Levinsky (1910–1990), NHL defenceman
- Eric Lindros (born 1973), NHL center
- Derek Linnell (born 1968)
- Ed Longfellow (1887–1959)
- Roberto Luongo (born 1979)
- Brooks Macek (born 1992)
- Ron MacLean (born 1960)
- Frank Mahovlich (born 1938)
- Mark Messier (born 1961), starred alongside Gretzky during Edmonton Oilers dynasty and Captain of New York Rangers when they won the Cup in 1994
- Stan Mikita (1940–2018)
- Howie Morenz (1902–1937), voted top athlete of the first half of the 20th century
- Bill Mosienko (1921–1994), NHL right winger
- Rick Nash (born 1984)
- David Nemirovsky (born 1976), NHL right wing
- Rob Niedermayer (born 1974), NHL right wing
- Scott Niedermayer (born 1973)
- Sarah Nurse (born 1995), Olympian
- Bobby Nystrom (born 1952), Swedish-Canadian NHL right wing
- Bobby Orr (born 1948), considered by many to be the best ever, revolutionized the role of a defenseman becoming the first to win the scoring title (twice)
- Caroline Ouellette (born 1979), four Olympic medals
- Bernie Parent (1945–2025), NHL goaltender
- Cherie Piper (born 1981)
- Bob Plager (1943–2021), defense
- Jacques Plante (1929–1986), pioneered active defensive play and use of face masks by goalies
- Denis Potvin (born 1953), NHL defenceman
- Manon Rhéaume (born 1972), first woman to play in a men's professional game
- Maurice Richard (1921–2000), "The Rocket", first player to score 50 goals in a season
- Brad Richards (born 1980), Stanley Cup and Lady Byng trophy winner
- Larry Robinson (born 1951), Hall of Fame defenseman
- Samuel Rothschild (1899–1987), NHL left wing
- Patrick Roy (born 1965)
- Jim Rutherford (born 1949), Beeton
- Kim St-Pierre (born 1978), goaltender for Canada's Women's National Hockey team from 1999 to 2011
- Joe Sakic (born 1969)
- Derek Sanderson (born 1946), NHL center
- Serge Savard (born 1946)
- Terry Sawchuk (1929–1970)
- Luke Schenn (born 1989)
- Joe Schertzl (1923–1979)
- Patrick Sharp (born 1981)
- Eliezer Sherbatov (born 1991), Canadian-Israeli left wing
- Eddie Shore (1902–1985), NHL defenceman
- Darryl Sittler (born 1950), NHL center
- Sami Jo Small (born 1976)
- Trevor Smith (born 1985), NHL centre
- Eric Staal (born 1984), Thunder Bay
- Jordan Staal (born 1988), Thunder Bay
- Marc Staal (born 1987), Thunder Bay
- Steven Stamkos (born 1990), Markham
- Ronnie Stern (born 1967), NHL right wing
- Vicky Sunohara (born 1970)
- Frederick Cyclone Taylor (1884–1979)
- John Tavares (born 1990), Toronto Maple Leafs
- Joe Thornton (born 1979), NHL centre (San Jose Sharks)
- Jonathan Toews (born 1988), captain (Chicago Blackhawks)
- Josh Tordjman (born 1985), NHL centre
- Raffi Torres (born 1981), Toronto
- Mike Veisor (born 1952), NHL goaltender
- Stephen Weiss (born 1983), NHL center (Florida Panthers)
- Arnott Whitney (1931–2024)
- Hayley Wickenheiser (born 1978), member of Canada's Women's National Hockey team from 1995, played in Finland's men's professional league (Mestis), five Olympic medals
- Ozzy Wiesblatt (born 2002), NHL right winger
- Brian Wilks (born 1966), NHL centre
- Bernie Wolfe (born 1951), NHL goaltender
- Steve Yzerman (born 1965), GM of Tampa Bay Lightning, long-time captain of Detroit Red Wings
- Chick Zamick (1926–2007)
- Larry "Rock" Zeidel (1928–2014), NHL defenceman

== Judo ==
- Mark Berger (born 1954), Olympic silver and bronze medals (heavyweight)
- Terry Farnsworth (born 1942), Olympic judoka

== Lacrosse ==
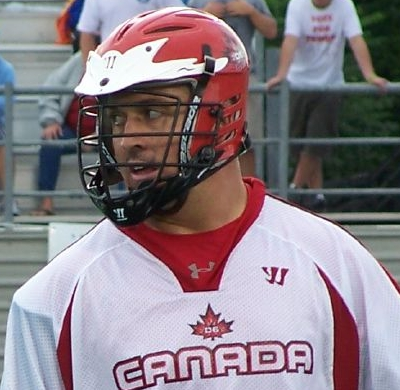
Gary Gait

- Gary Gait (born 1967)
- Paul Gait (born 1967)
- John Grant Jr. (born 1974)
- Bill Isaacs (1914–1985)
- Chris Levis (born 1976)
- Man Afraid of the Soap (1869–1937)
- Gaylord Powless
- Geoff Snider (born 1981)
- John Tavares (born 1968)
- Jim Veltman (born 1966)

== Mixed martial arts ==
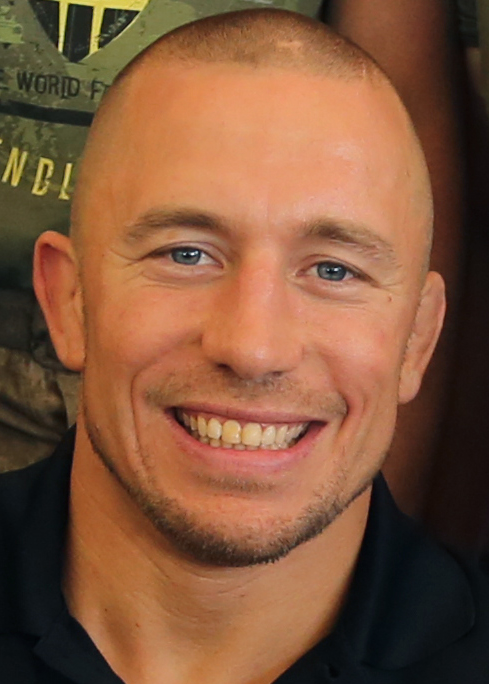
Georges St-Pierre

- Patrick Côté (born 1980)
- Nick Denis (born 1983)
- Gary Goodridge (born 1966)
- Jonathan Goulet (born 1979)
- T. J. Grant (born 1984)
- Mark Hominick (born 1982)
- Denis Kang (born 1977)
- David Loiseau (born 1979)
- Rory MacDonald (born 1989)
- Carlos Newton (born 1976), former UFC welterweight champion
- Georges St-Pierre (born 1981), former UFC welterweight and middleweight champion
- Sam Stout (born 1984)

== Multiple sports ==
- Lionel Conacher (1900–1954), played multiple sports and turned professional in ice hockey, Canadian football and lacrosse
- Leah Goldstein (born 1969), Canadian-born Israeli professional road racing cyclist, former World Bantamweight Kickboxing Champion, and Israel's Duathlon champion
- Clara Hughes (born 1972), speed skating and cycling medallist in both summer and winter Olympics
- Hayley Wickenheiser (born 1978), known as being one of the best female ice hockey players in the world; also participated for Canada in the Olympics in softball

== Professional rodeo ==
- Earl W. Bascom (1906–1995), designer of hornless bronc saddle (1922) and bareback rigging (1924)

== Professional wrestling ==
- Abdullah the Butcher (Lawrence Shreve) (born 1941)
- Chris Benoit (1967–2007)
- Traci Brooks (born 1975)
- Christian Cage (Jason Reso) (born 1973)
- Don Callis (born 1969)
- Rene Dupree (Rene Goguen) (born 1983)
- Earthquake (John Tenta) (1963–2006)
- Edge (Adam Copeland) (born 1973)
- Ronnie Garvin (born 1945)
- Sylvain Grenier (born 1977)
- Hart wrestling family:
  - Stu Hart (1915–2003), family patriarch married American Helen Smith and had twelve children
    - Smith Hart (1948–2017)
    - Bruce Hart (born 1950)
    - Keith Hart (born 1951)
    - Wayne Hart (born 1952)
    - Dean Hart (1954–1990)
    - Bret 'The Hitman' Hart (born 1957)
    - Ross Hart (born 1960)
    - Alison Hart, daughter of Stu and Helen married Canadian wrestler Ben Bassarab (born 1960)
    - Diana Hart (born 1963), involved in 1990s WWE storylines, author of several wrestling books, and one-time wife of British wrestler Davey Boy Smith (1962–2002)
    - Owen Hart (1965–1999)
      - Teddy Hart (Edward Annis) (born 1980), son of Stu's daughter Georgia Hart and American wrestler B. J. Annis (born c. 1947)
      - Natalya (Natalie Neidhart) (born 1982), daughter of Stu's daughter Ellie Hart and American wrestler Jim Neidhart (1955–2018), she is married to Tyson Kidd (TJ Wilson) (born 1980)
      - David Hart Smith (Harry Smith) (born 1985), son of Diana Hart and Davey Boy Smith
      - Brooke B. Hart, daughter of Alison Hart and Ben Bassarab married Pete Wilson (born 1985)
      - Matt Hart (born 1994), son of Smith Hart
      - Mike Hart (born 1982), stepson of Smith Hart
- Chris Jericho (Chris Irvine) (born 1970)
- Rocky Johnson (1944–2020)
- Gail Kim (born 1976)
- Gene Kiniski (1928–2010)
- Jinder Mahal (born 1986)
- Kurrgan (Robert Maillet) (born 1969)
- Santino Marella (Anthony Carelli) (born 1974)
- Rick Martel (born 1956)
- Kenny Omega (Tyson Smith) (born 1983)
- Maryse Ouellet (born 1983)
- Kevin Owens (born 1984)
- Roddy Piper (Roderick Toombs) (1954–2015)
- Bobby Roode (born 1978)
- Jacques Rougeau (born 1960)
- Raymond Rougeau (born 1955)
- Tiger Ali Singh (born 1971)
- Tiger Jeet Singh (born 1944)
- Lance Storm (Lance Evers) (born 1969)
- Trish Stratus (Patricia Stratigias) (born 1975)
- Val Venis (Sean Morley) (born 1971)
- Vampiro (Ian Hodgkinson) (born 1967)
- Whipper Billy Watson (1915–1990)
- Petey Williams (born 1981)
- Eric Young (born 1980)
- Sami Zayn (born 1984)

== Rowing, kayaking ==
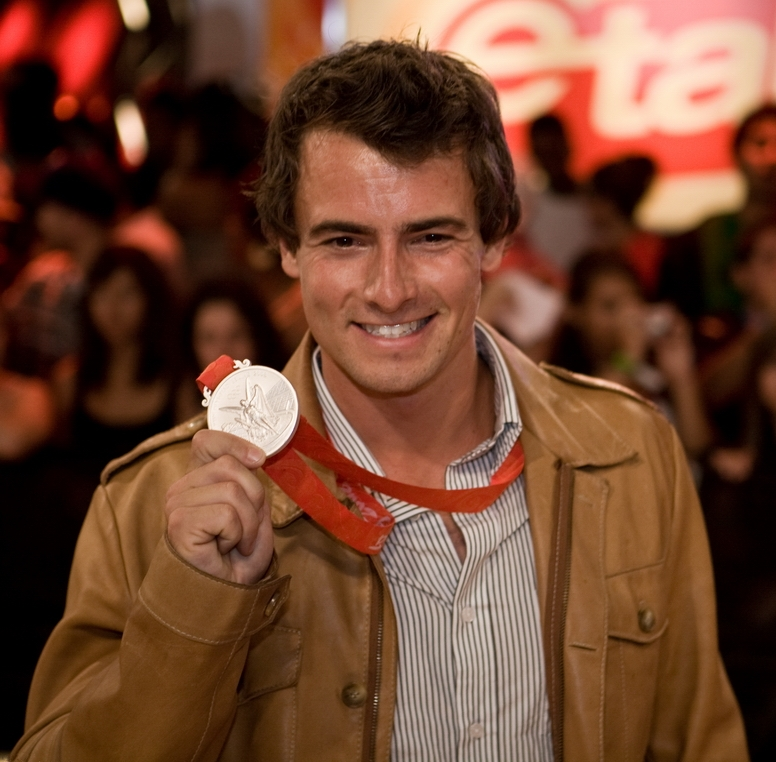
Adam Van Koeverden

- Louis Ginglo
- Silken Laumann (born 1964)
- Marnie McBean (born 1968)
- Lesley Thompson (born 1959), five Olympic medals
- Adam van Koeverden (born 1982), Olympic gold medal winner in sprint kayaking

== Rugby union ==
- Dan Baugh (born 1974)
- Norm Hadley (1964–2016)
- Dave Moonlight (born 1979)
- Gareth Rees (born 1967)
- Kevin Tkachuk (born 1976)

== Skeleton ==
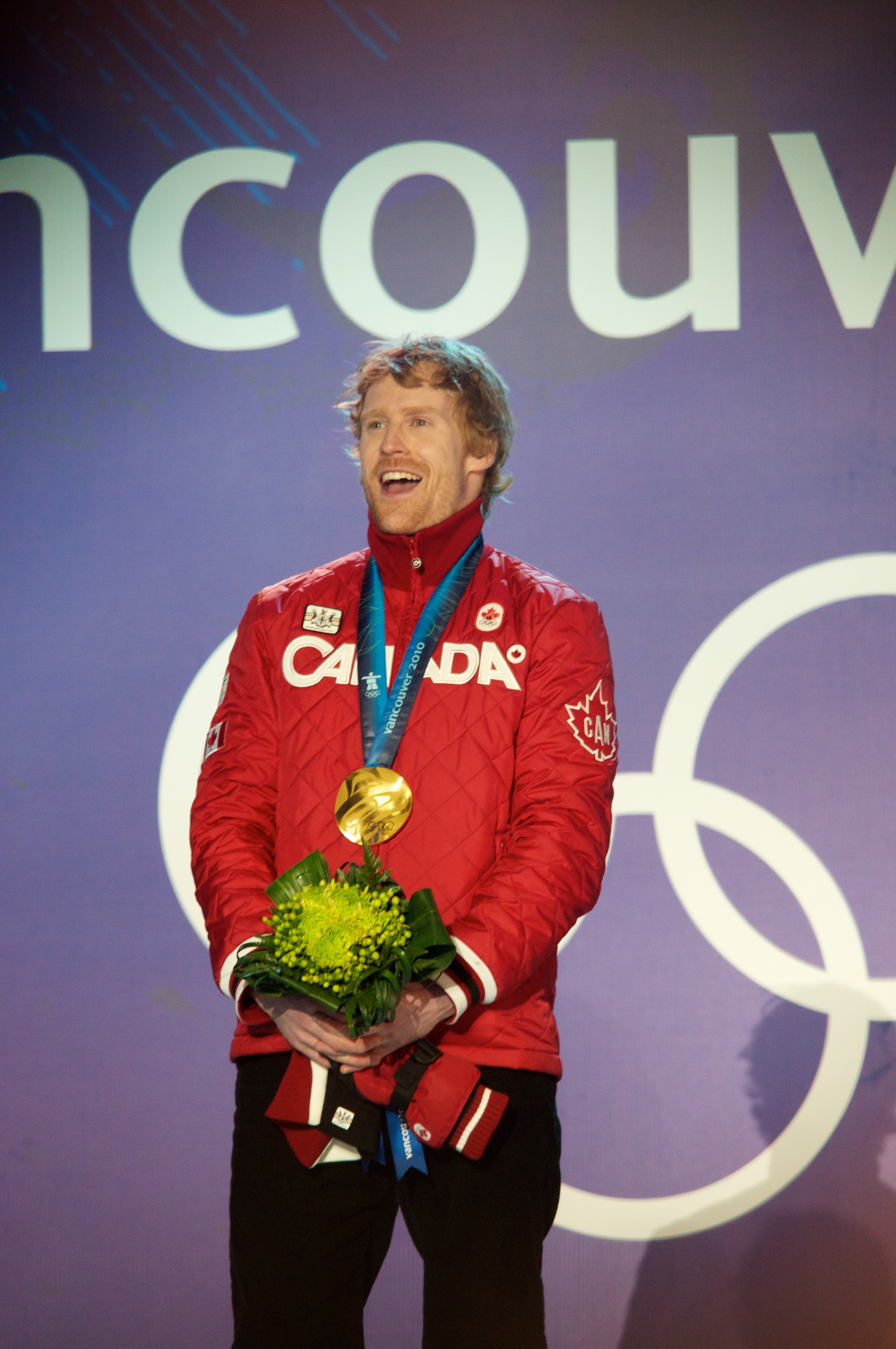
Jon Montgomery

- Jon Montgomery (born 1979), Olympic gold medal, 2010
- Jeff Pain (born 1970), Olympic silver medal, 2006

== Skiing ==
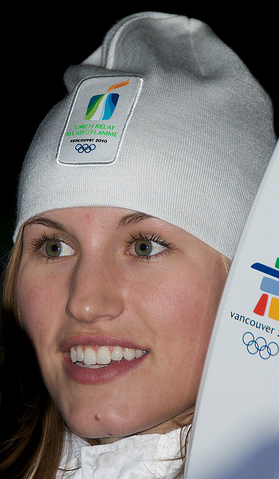
Julia Murray

- Jean-Luc Brassard (born 1972), freestyle ski, moguls, Olympic gold medal, 1994
- Todd Brooker (born 1959)
- The Crazy Canucks, a group of downhill racers who were extraordinarily successful in the late 1970s and early 1980s:
  - Jim Hunter (born 1953)
  - Dave Irwin (born 1954)
  - Dave Murray (1953–1990)
  - Steve Podborski (born 1957), Canada's only overall World Cup winner
  - Ken Read (born 1955), the first Canadian male to win on the World Cup circuit
- Michel Daigle (born 1950), 1970s freestyle skiing pioneer
- Nancy Greene (born 1943), alpine skiing, downhill, Olympic gold medal, 1968
- Ann Heggtveit (born 1939), world and 1960 Winter Olympics ski champion
- Lewis Irving (born 1995)
- Kathy Kreiner (born 1957), alpine skiing, giant slalom, Olympic gold medal, 1976
- Kerrin Lee-Gartner (born 1966), alpine skiing, downhill, Olympic gold medal, 1992
- Brady Leman (born 1986)
- Julia Murray (born 1988)
- Manuel Osborne-Paradis (born 1984), North Vancouver, British Columbia
- TJ Schiller (born 1986)
- Gerry Sorensen (born 1958), alpine skiing, downhill, world champion, 1982
- Don Stevens (born 1963), alpine world ski champion and in the 1988 winter Olympics
- Melanie Turgeon (born 1976), alpine skiing, downhill, world champion, 1993
- Lucille Wheeler (born 1935), alpine world ski champion
- Rhona and Rhoda Wurtele, alpine ski champions of the 1940s and 1950s

== Snowboarding ==
- Calynn Irwin (born 1989)
- Mark McMorris (born 1993), Olympic bronze medallist
- Ross Rebagliati (born 1971), Olympic snowboarding champion
- Maelle Ricker (born 1978), Olympic gold medallist

== Soccer ==
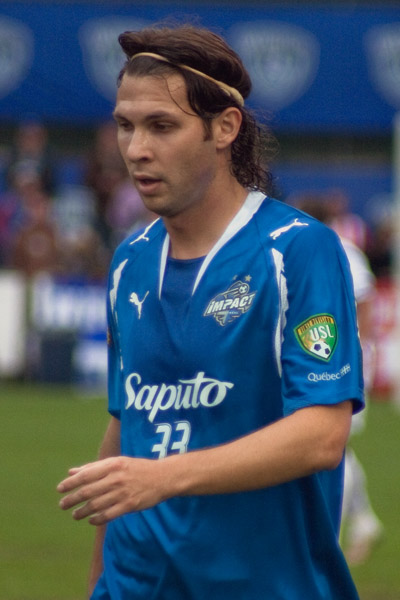
Adam Braz

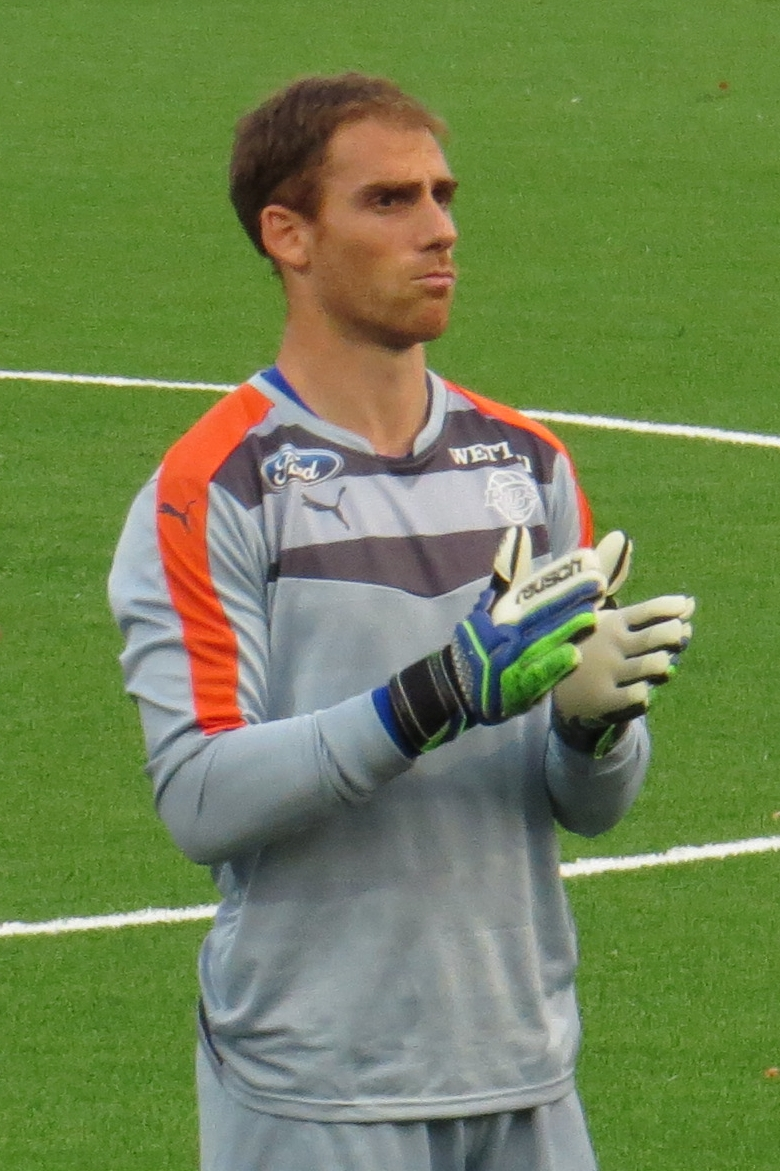
Tomer Chencinski

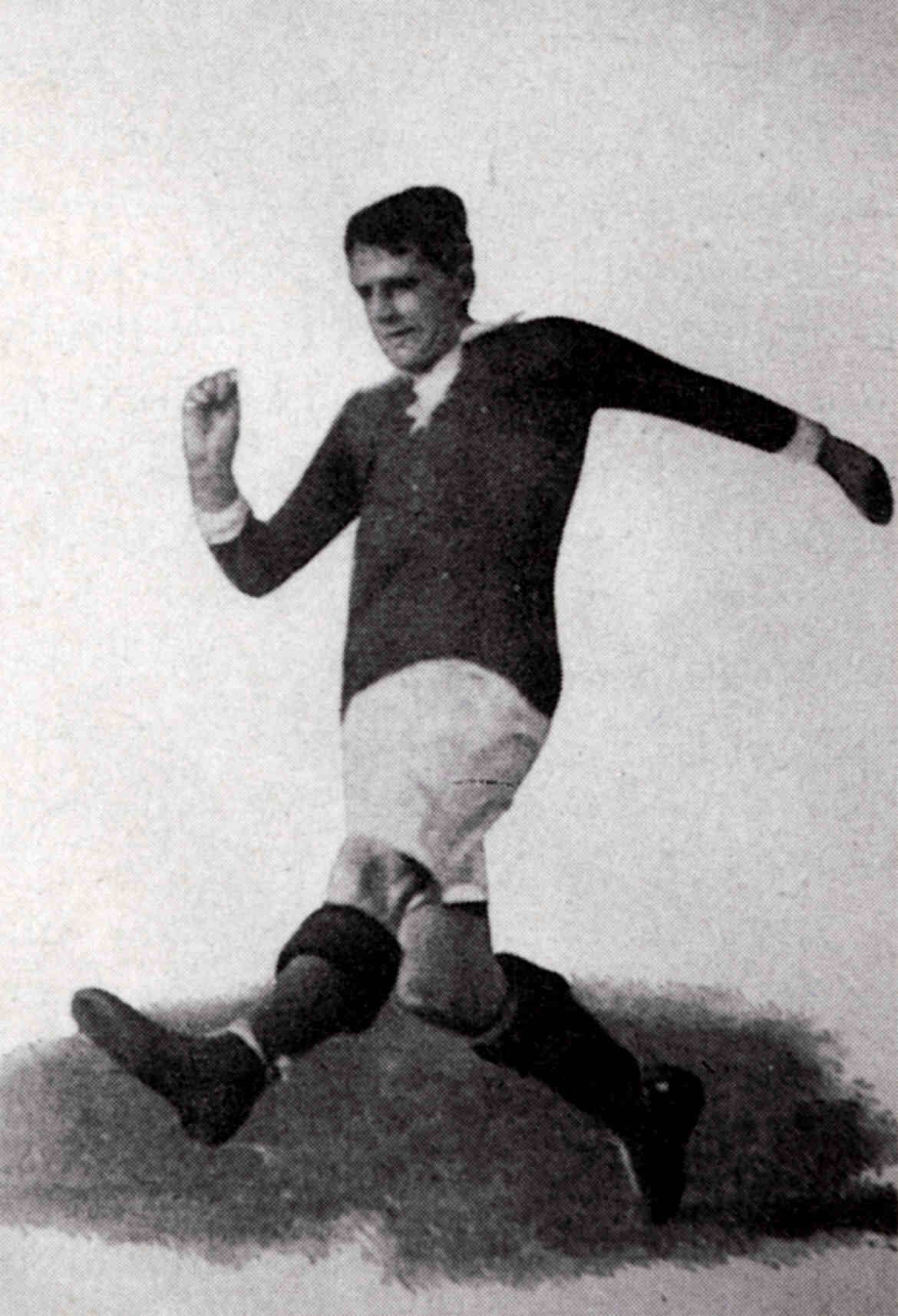
Gottfried Fuchs

- Adam Braz (born 1981), defender
- Jim Brennan (born 1977)
- Kadeisha Buchanan (born 1995), multiple award-winning defender for national team
- John Catliff (born 1965), striker
- Tomer Chencinski (born 1984), Israeli-Canadian goalkeeper
- Alphonso Davies (born 2000)
- Jonathan de Guzman (born 1987), midfielder
- Julian de Guzman (born 1981), 2007 Gold Cup MVP
- Dwayne De Rosario (born 1978), 2007 MLS Cup MVP
- David Edgar (born 1987)
- Rob Friend (born 1981), forward
- Gottfried Fuchs (1889–1972), German (national team)-Canadian Olympic football player
- Daniel Haber (born 1992), forward, Team Canada
- Owen Hargreaves (born 1981), England international
- Junior Hoilett (born 1990), winger
- Charmaine Hooper (born 1968)
- Jordyn Huitema (born 2001), national team forward
- Atiba Hutchinson (born 1983), midfielder
- Simeon Jackson (born 1987), forward
- Will Johnson (born 1987), midfielder
- Kaylyn Kyle (born 1988), sports broadcaster and former national team midfielder
- Karina LeBlanc (born 1980), sports broadcaster and former national team goalkeeper
- Bobby Lenarduzzi (born 1955)
- Diana Matheson (born 1984), national team midfielder
- Kevin McKenna (born 1980), Team Canada captain
- Erin McLeod (born 1983), national team goalkeeper
- Dale Mitchell (born 1958), striker
- Jimmy Nicholl (born 1956), played for N. Ireland
- Olivier Occéan (born 1981)
- Pedro Pacheco (born 1984)
- Paul Peschisolido (born 1971)
- Nichelle Prince (born 1995), national team forward
- Quinn (born 1995), national team defender
- Tomasz Radzinski (born 1973)
- Randy Samuel (born 1963)
- Sophie Schmidt (born 1988), national team midfielder
- Christine Sinclair (born 1983), world's all-time leader for international goals
- Jacob Shaffelburg (born 1999), winger
- Paul Stalteri (born 1977)
- John van't Schip (born 1963), played for the Netherlands

== Speed skating ==
=== Long track ===
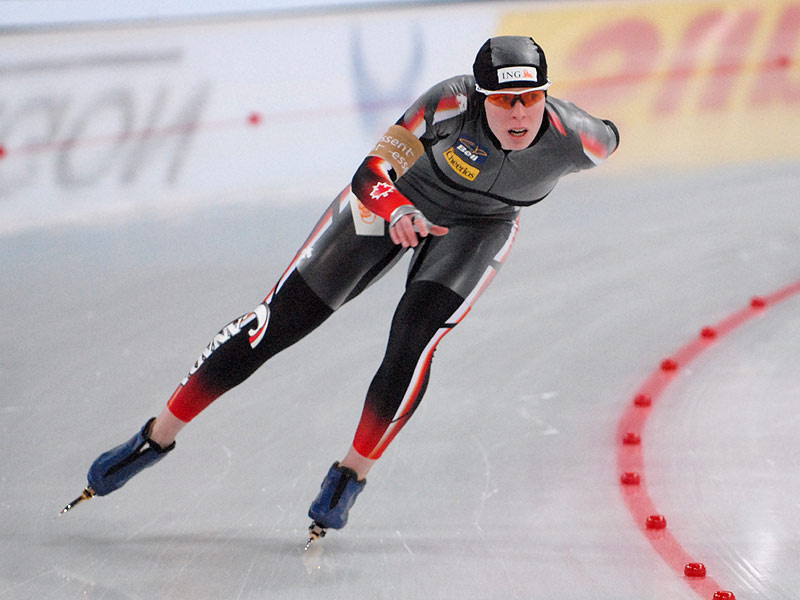
Christine Nesbitt

- Susan Auch (born 1966)
- Gaétan Boucher (born 1958), four-time Olympic medallist, 1980, 1984
- Lela Brooks (1908–1990)
- Sylvia Burka (born 1954)
- Sylvie Daigle (born 1962)
- Charles Gorman (1898–1940)
- Clara Hughes (born 1972), six Olympic medals
- Catriona Le May Doan (born 1970)
- Christine Nesbitt (born 1985), Olympic gold medallist, 1000m long track, 2010
- Frank Stack (1906–1987)
- Jeremy Wotherspoon (born 1976), world record holder at 500m

=== Short track ===
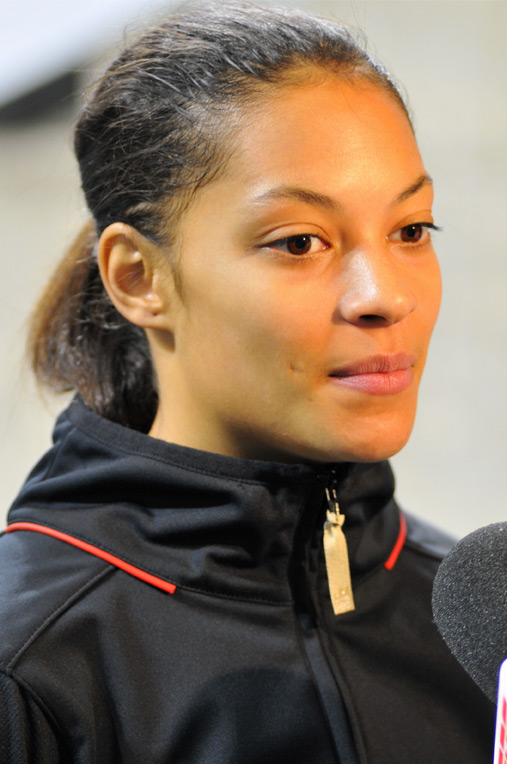
Kalyna Roberge

- Guillaume Bastille (born 1985), Olympic gold medallist, 2010
- Isabelle Charest (born 1971)
- Sylvie Daigle (born 1962), Olympic gold medallist, 1992
- Marc Gagnon (born 1975), Olympic gold medallist, 1998 and 2002
- Charles Hamelin (born 1984), Olympic gold medallist, 2010
- François Hamelin (born 1986), Olympic gold medallist, 2010
- Olivier Jean (born 1984), Olympic gold medallist, 2010
- Nathalie Lambert (born 1963), Olympic gold medallist, 1992
- Annie Perreault (born 1971), Olympic gold medallist, 1992 and 1998
- Kalyna Roberge (born 1986)

== Squash ==
- Jonathon Power (born 1974), the only North American squash player to attain the #1 world ranking
- Graham Ryding (born 1975)

== Swimming and diving ==
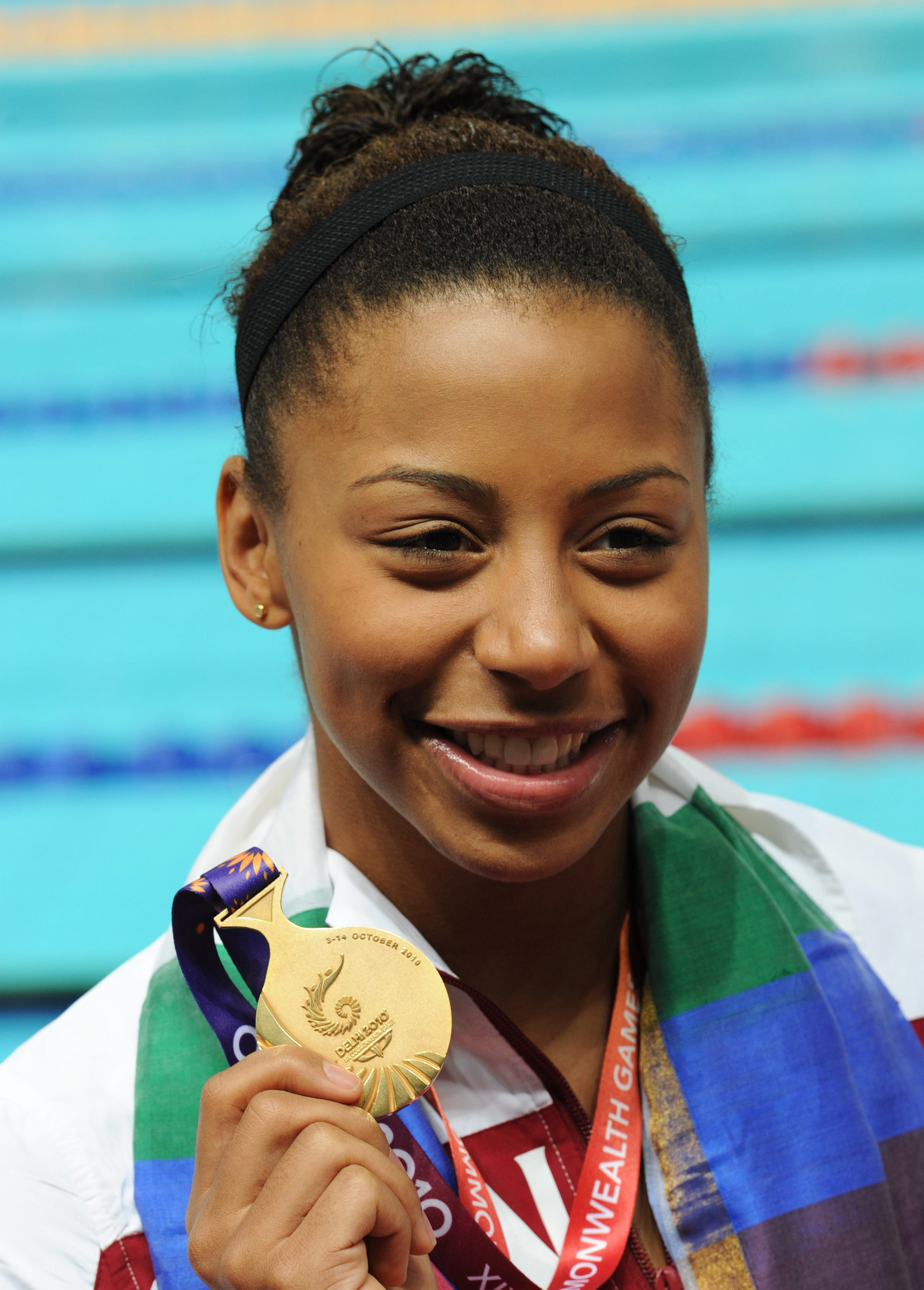
Jennifer Abel

- Jennifer Abel (born 1991)
- Alex Baumann (born 1964), 1984 medley Olympic champion
- Marilyn Bell (born 1937), first person to swim Lake Ontario
- Meaghan Benfeito (born 1989)
- Sylvie Bernier (born 1964), Canada's first gold medal in Olympic diving
- Victor Davis (1964–1989), Olympic swimming champion
- Alexandre Despatie (born 1985), world diving champion
- Émilie Heymans (born 1981), four Olympic diving medals
- Penny Oleksiak (born 2000), seven Olympic medals
- Dick Pound (born 1942)
- Mark Tewksbury (born 1968), Olympic gold medallist

== Synchronized swimming ==
- Sylvie Fréchette (born 1967)
- Carolyn Waldo (born 1964)

== Tennis ==
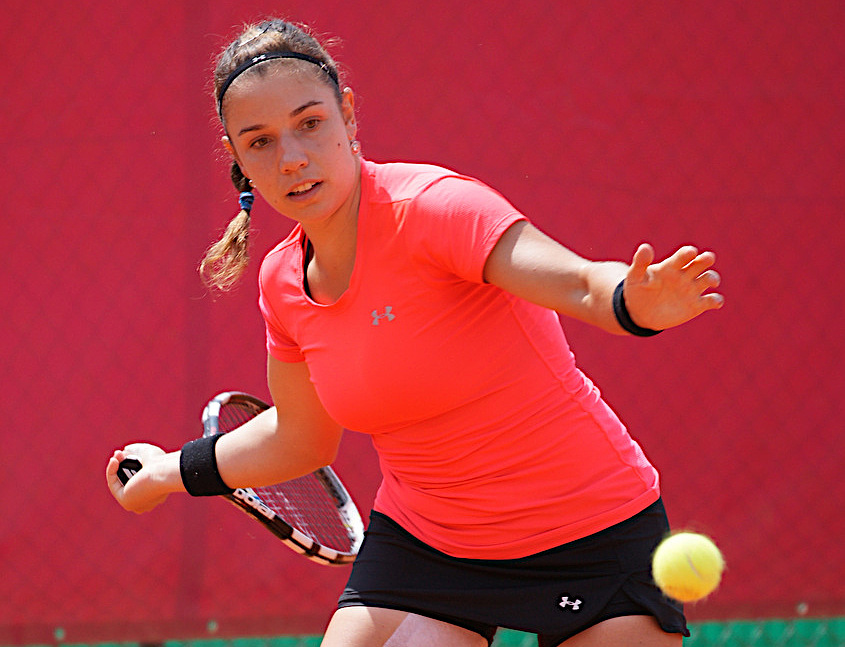
Sharon Fichman

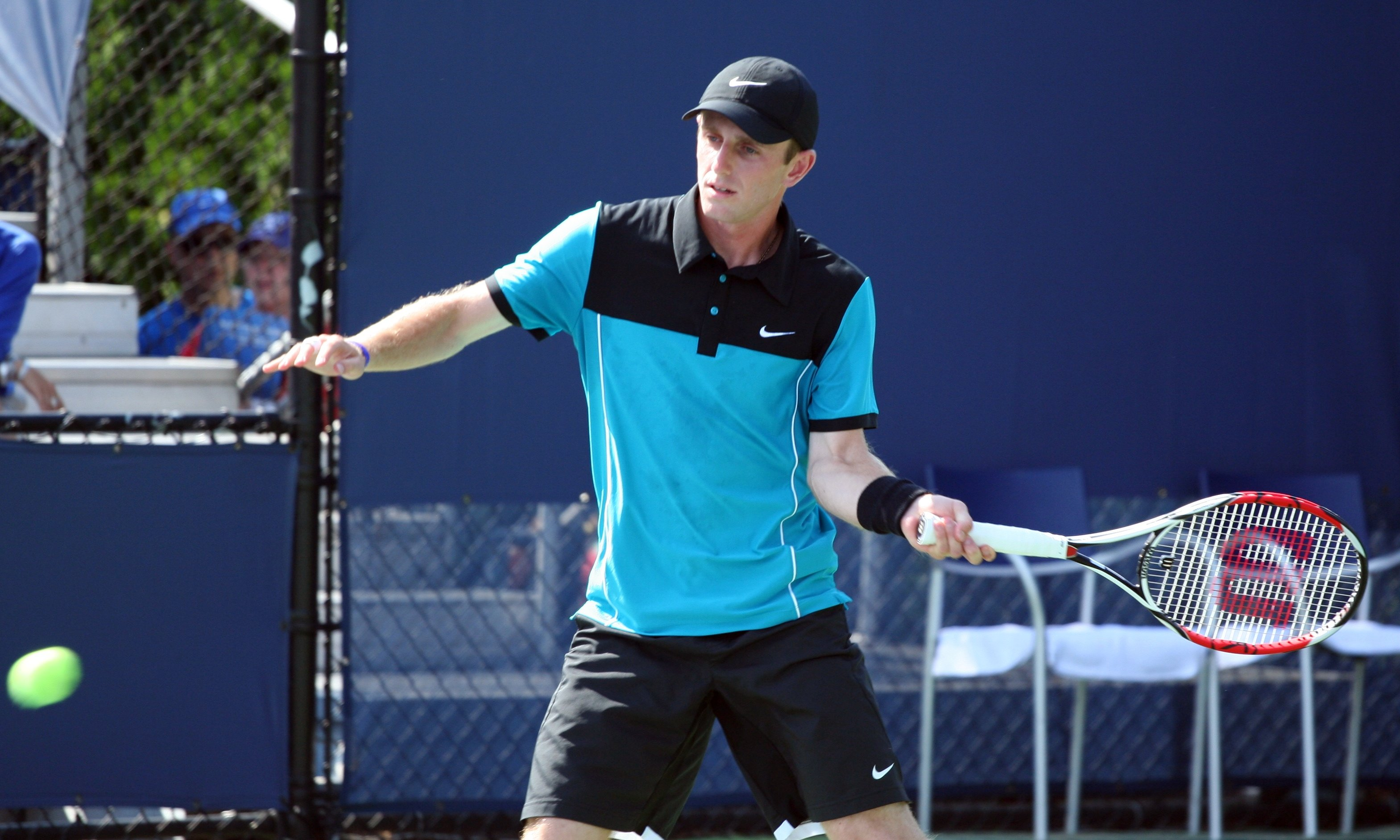
Jesse Levine

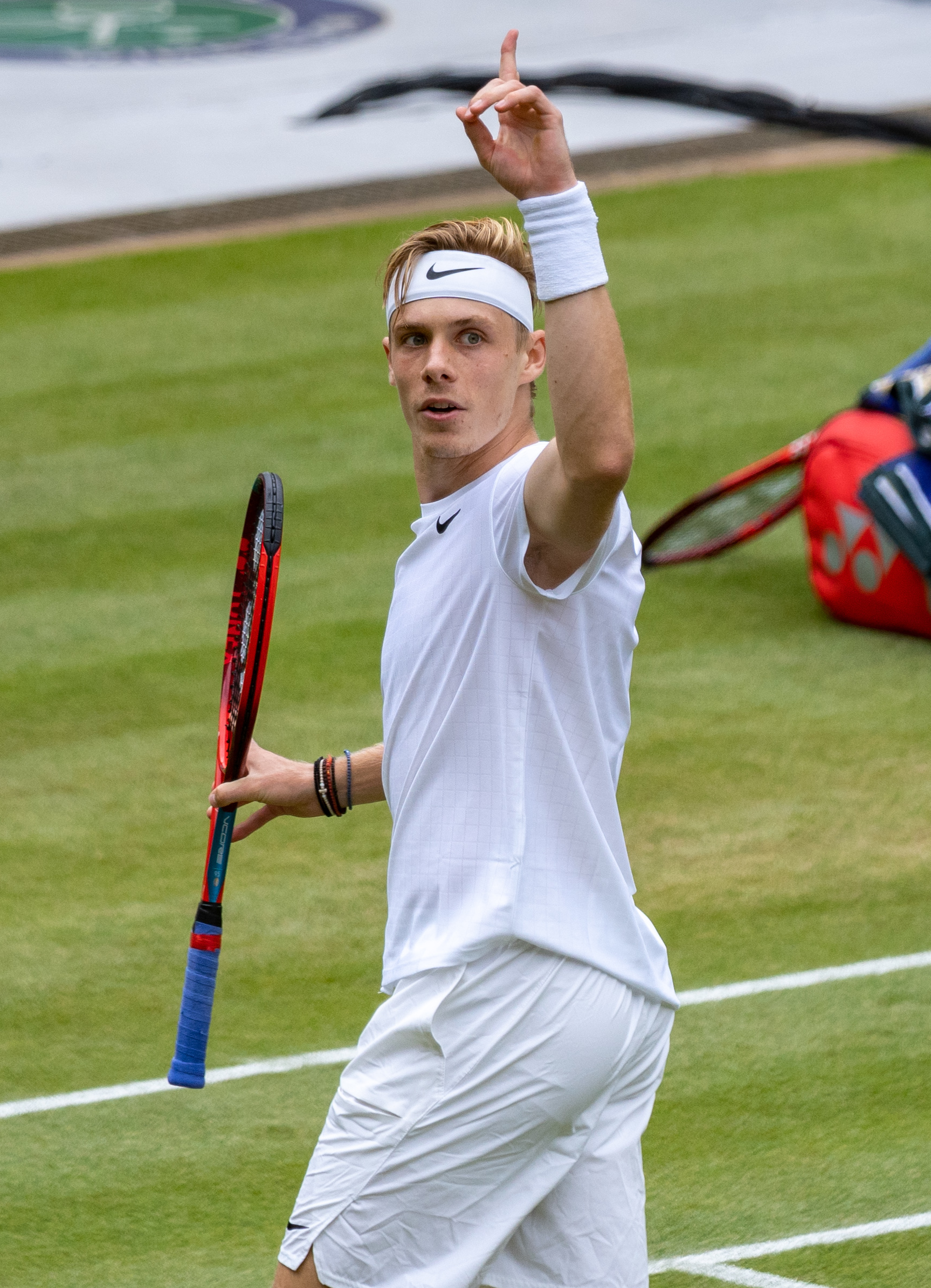
Denis Shapovalov

- Françoise Abanda (born 1997)
- Dave Abelson (born 1975)
- Félix Auger-Aliassime (born 2000), highest world ranking No. 6
- Bianca Andreescu (born 2000), highest world ranking No. 4
- Carling Bassett-Seguso (born 1967), highest world ranking No. 8
- Robert Bédard (born 1931), the most recent Canadian to win the Canadian Open men's singles championship (1955)
- Vicki Berner (1945–2017), Tennis Canada Hall of Fame
- Eugenie Bouchard (born 1994), highest world ranking No. 5
- Gabriela Dabrowski (born 1992)
- Frank Dancevic (born 1984)
- Leylah Annie Fernandez (born 2002), highest world ranking No. 13
- Sharon Fichman (born 1990), Israeli-Canadian, was Canada's Under-18 Indoor & Outdoor National girls champion, also won the doubles title, won the Australian Open and French Open junior doubles championships.
- I.F. Hellmuth (1854–1944), first champion of what became the Rogers Cup
- Helen Kelesi (born 1969), highest world ranking No. 13
- Jesse Levine (born 1987), American-Canadian, won the U.S. Clay Court 14 Nationals singles championship, the USTA boys' 16s doubles championship, and the 2005 Wimbledon boys' doubles championship
- Glenn Michibata (born 1962)
- Daniel Nestor (born 1972), highest world ranking in doubles #1
- Peter Polansky (born 1988), Canada's top singles player from 2010 until 2011
- Vasek Pospisil (born 1990), highest world ranking No. 25
- Mary Pierce (born 1975), naturalized French
- Milos Raonic (born 1990), highest world ranking No. 3
- Greg Rusedski (born 1973), naturalized British
- Denis Shapovalov (born 1999), Israeli-Canadian, highest world ranking No. 10
- Andrew Sznajder (born 1967), highest world ranking No. 46, Canada Tennis Hall of Fame
- Aleksandra Wozniak (born 1987), highest world ranking No. 21

== Track and field ==
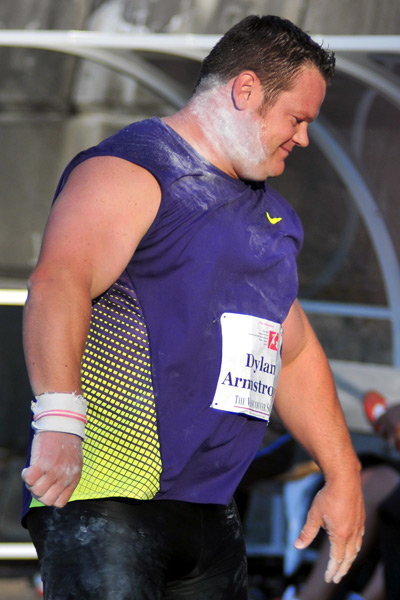
Dylan Armstrong

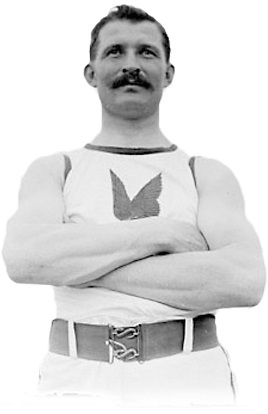
Etienne Desmarteau

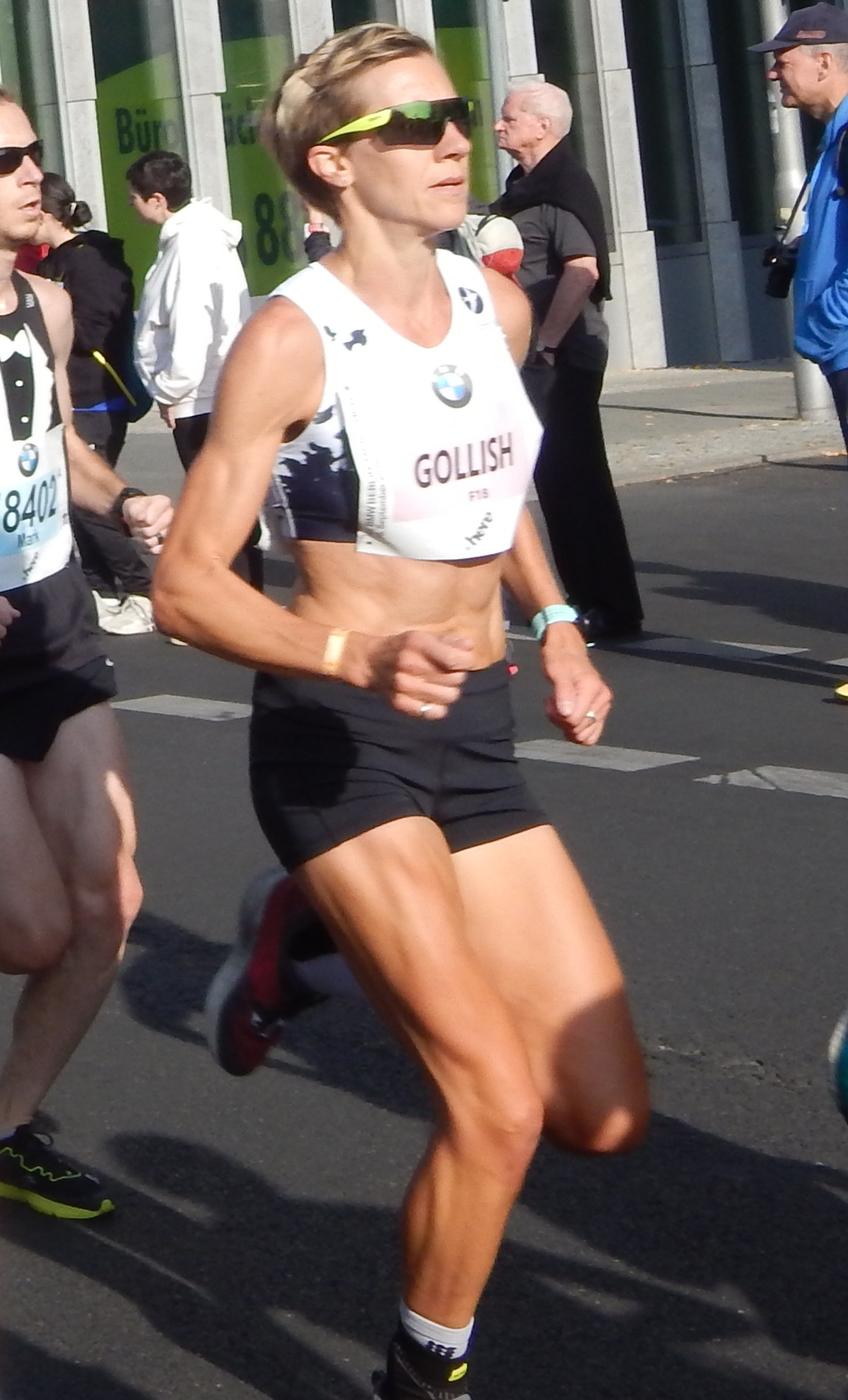
Sasha Gollish

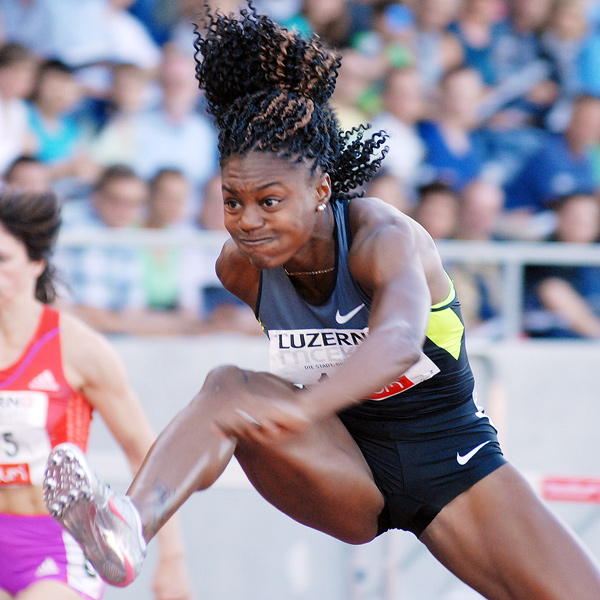
Nikkita Holder

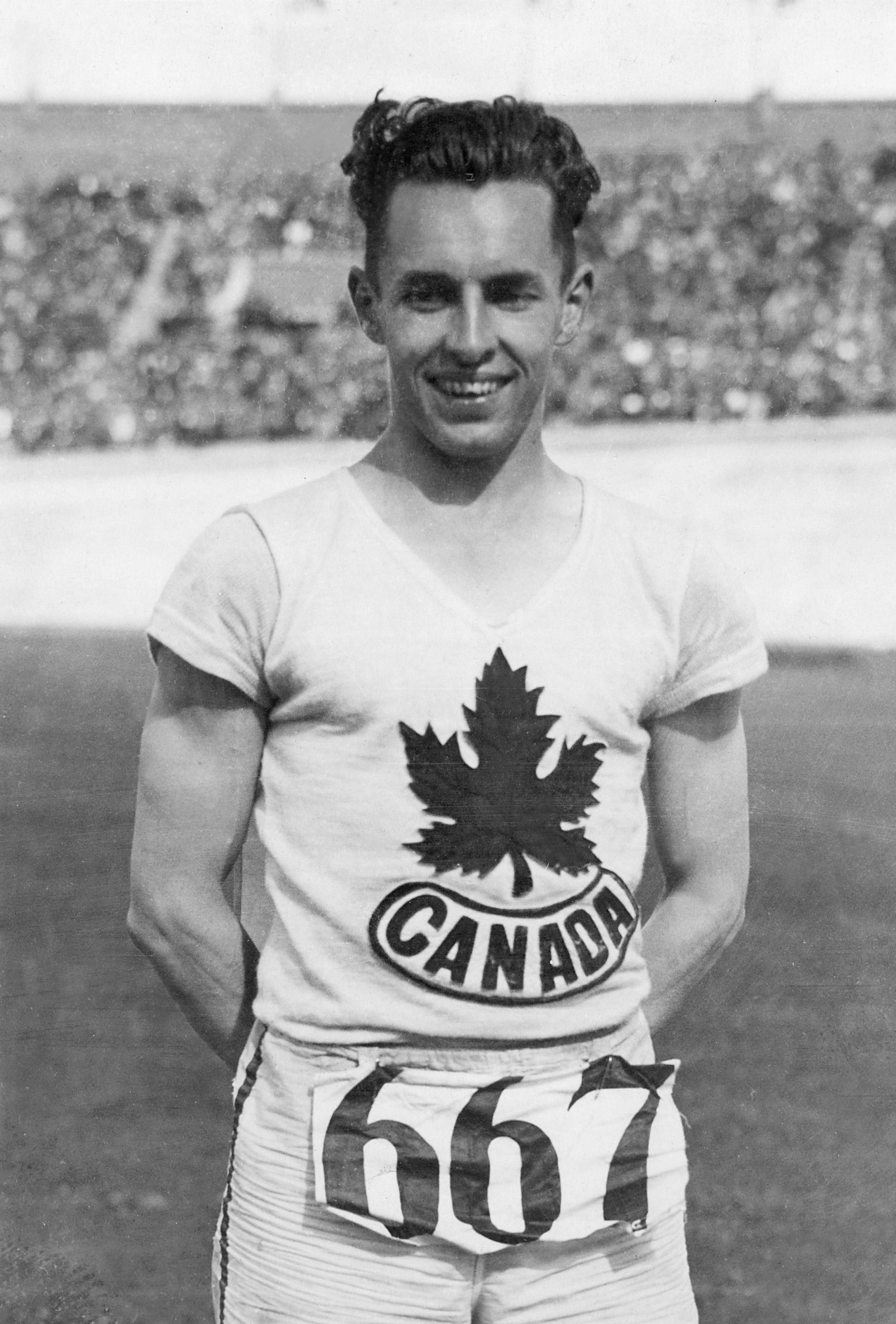
Percy Williams

- Jamie Adjetey-Nelson (born 1984), decathlete and gold medallist at the 2010 Commonwealth Games
- Dylan Armstrong (born 1981), shot putter, Pan American Games record, second at world championships
- Donovan Bailey (born 1967), sprinter, former 100m world record holder
- Simon Bairu (born 1983), distance runner, 2010 IAAF World Cross Country Championships
- Bryan Barnett (born 1987), sprinter, 100m and 200m
- Joël Bourgeois (born 1971), 3000 meter Steeplechase, 1996 and 2000 Olympics
- Nathan Brannen (born 1982), 800m, 2009 World Championships
- Pierre Browne (born 1980), sprinter, 100m in the Summer Olympics
- Jared Connaughton (born 1985), sprinter, 100m and 200m
- Reid Coolsaet (born 1979), marathon runner, 2012 London Summer Olympics
- Bruce Deacon (born 1966), marathon runner, 1996 and 2000 Olympics
- Andre De Grasse (born 1994), sprinter, Rio 2016 Medallist: 100m Bronze, 200m Silver, and 4 × 100 m relay Bronze
- Étienne Desmarteau (1873–1905), weight thrower, Olympic champion
- Jerome Drayton (1945–2025), marathon runner; three-time winner of the Fukuoka Marathon; Canadian marathon record holder since 1969; 1968 and 1976 Olympic Games
- Dave Edge (born 1954), British-Canadian Olympic long-distance runner
- Phil Edwards (1907–1971), middle-distance runner, five Olympic bronze medals
- Sam Effah (born 1988), sprinter, 100m
- Alice Falaiye (born 1978), long jumper, gold medallist at the 2009 Pan American Games and 2010 Commonwealth Games
- Perdita Felicien (born 1980), 2003 world champion in 100m hurdles
- Nicole Forrester (born 1976), high jumper, gold medallist at the 2010 Commonwealth Games
- Sultana Frizell (born 1984), hammer thrower, gold medallist at the 2010 Commonwealth Games
- Phylicia George (born 1987), 100m hurdles
- Eric Gillis (born 1980), marathon runner, Summer Olympics: 2008 Beijing and London 2012
- Sasha Gollish (born 1981), competitive runner, bronze medallist in the 2015 Pan American Games 1500m and gold medallist in the 2013 Maccabiah Games half-marathon
- Abby Hoffman (born 1947), four-time Olympian (800-meter)
- Matthew Hughes (born 1989), 3000m steeplechase, gold medallist at the 2015 Pan American Games, Rio 2016
- Nikkita Holder (born 1987), 100m hurdles
- Barbara Howard (1920–2017), sprinter, silver and bronze relay medalist at the 1938 British Empire Games
- Harry Jerome (1940–1982), sprinter, bronze medallist in the 100m at the 1964 Summer Olympics
- Ben Johnson (born 1961), sprinter, disqualified from Olympic gold medal for doping
- Jennifer Joyce (born 1980), hammer thrower, silver medallist at the 2006 Commonwealth Games
- Robert Kerr (1882–1963), sprinter, 1908 Summer Olympics medallist: a gold and a bronze
- Michael LeBlanc (born 1987), sprinter, 2012 IAAF World Indoor Championships
- Cameron Levins (born 1989), distance runner, inaugural Canadian to win the Bowerman Award (NCAA male athlete of the year); London 2012 Olympics
- Priscilla Lopes-Schliep (born 1982), 100m hurdles, silver medallist at the 2009 World Championships
- Gordon Orlikow (born 1960), decathlon, heptathlon, and hurdles competitor, won medals in the 73rd Drake Relays, the 1981 Maccabiah Games and 1985 Maccabiah Games in Israel, and the 1987 Pan American Games, Athletics Canada Chairman, Canadian Olympic Committee member, Korn/Ferry International partner
- George Orton (1873–1958), inaugural Canadian Olympics medallist
- Hank Palmer (born 1985), sprinter, 2008 Summer Olympics
- Bruno Pauletto (born 1954), shot putter
- Sydney David Pierce (1901–1992), Olympic hurdler
- Gary Reed (born 1981), 800m, silver medallist at the 2007 World Championships
- Fanny Rosenfeld (1904–1969), runner & long jumper, world record (100-yard dash); Olympic medallist (4x100-m relay) and silver (100-m)
- Scott Russell (born 1979), javelin thrower, 2001 World Championships, bronze medallist at the 2002 Commonwealth Games, 2008 Summer Olympics
- Bruny Surin (born 1967), sprinter, tied with Donovan Bailey for Canadian 100m record
- Brianne Theisen (born 1988), heptathlete, 2009 World Championships
- Justyn Warner (born 1987), sprinter, 100m
- Angela Whyte (born 1980), 100m hurdles, silver medallist at the 2007 and 2011 Pan American Games
- Percy Williams (1908–1982), sprinter, double gold medallist at the 1928 Olympics, former world record holder in the 100m
- Dylan Wykes (born 1983), marathon runner, 2009 World Championships and 2012 London Summer Olympics
- Jessica Zelinka (born 1981), heptathlete and pentathlete, gold medallist at the 2007 Pan American Games

== Triathlon ==
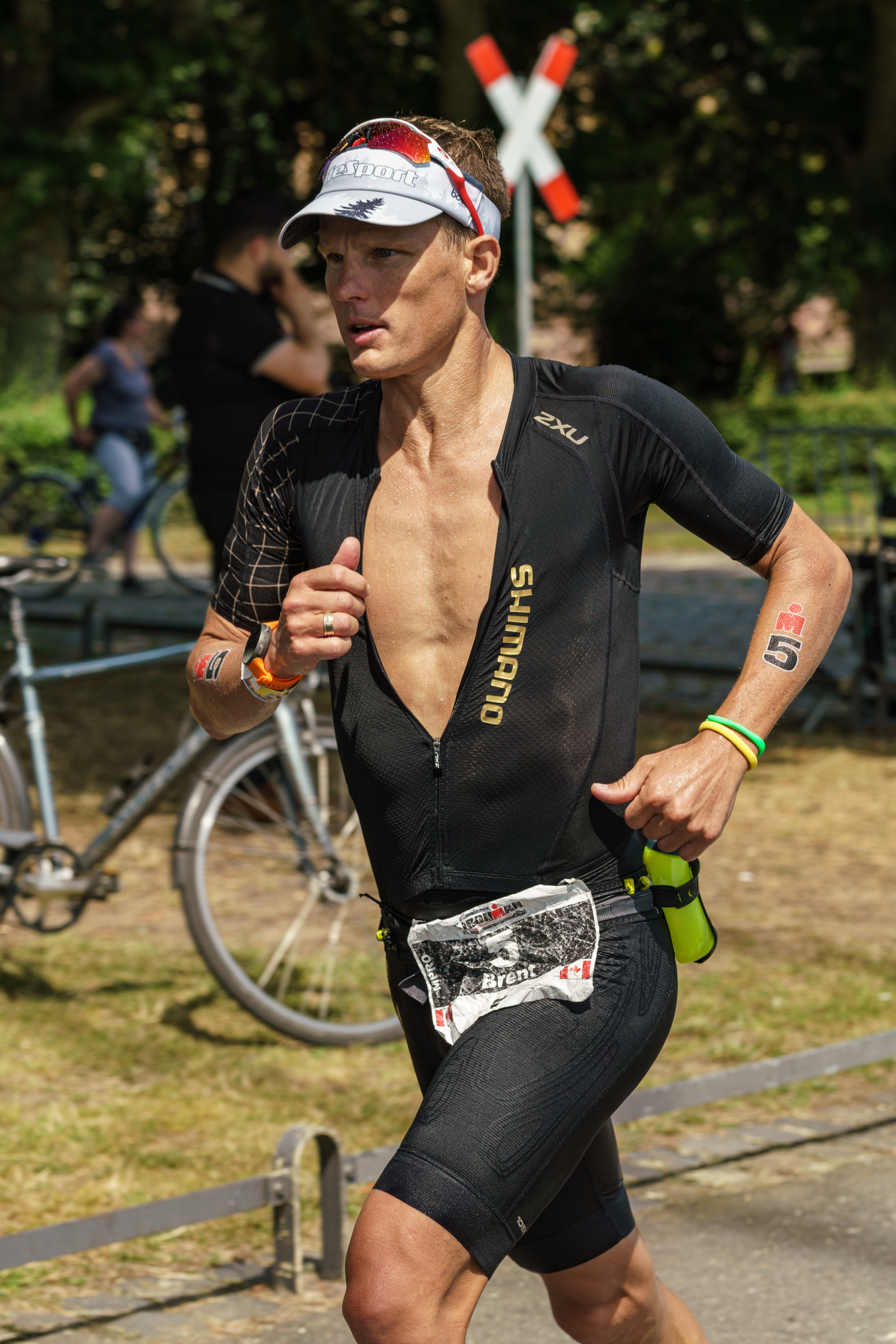
Brent McMahon

- Paula Findlay (born 1989), bronze medallist at the 2009 ITU World Championships, 2012 London Summer Olympics
- Kyle Jones (born 1984), 2012 London Olympics
- Brent McMahon (born 1980), silver at the 2007 Pan American Games, bronze at the 2011 Pan American Games, 2012 London Summer Olympics
- Lionel Sanders (born 1988), winner of the 2017 ITU Long Distance Triathlon World Championships
- Kathy Tremblay (born 1982), 2012 London Summer Olympics
- Simon Whitfield (born 1975), gold at the 2000 Olympics and silver at the 2008 Olympics, competed at the 2012 London Summer Olympics

== Water skiing ==
- Chantal Singer, internationally ranked waterskier

== Weightlifting ==
- Louis Cyr (1863–1912), weightlifter
- The Great Antonio (1925–2003), strongman and wrestler

== Wrestling ==
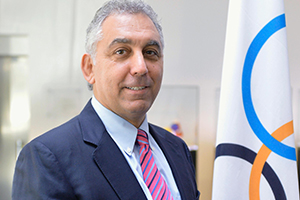
Howard Stupp

- Andy Borodow (born 1969), Olympic wrestler, Maccabiah champion, Commonwealth champion
- Garry Kallos (born 1956), Olympic light-heavyweight wrestler, Maccabiah champion, and sambo champion
- Oleg Ladik (born 1971), Olympic wrestler
- Fred Oberlander (1911–1996), world champion (freestyle heavyweight); Maccabiah champion
- Herbert Singerman (born 1946), Olympic wrestler
- Howard Stupp (born 1955), Olympic wrestler
- Ari Taub (born 1971), Olympic Greco-Roman wrestler
- David Zilberman (born 1982), Olympic heavyweight wrestler

== Bodybuilding athletes ==
- Dayana Cadeau (born 1966), Vancouver - bodybuilder
- Cathy LeFrançois (born 1971), Amqui, Quebec - bodybuilder
- Chris Bumstead (born 1995), Ottawa, Ontario - bodybuilder

== Nationally recognized honour lists ==
- Bobbie Rosenfeld Award (female only)
- Canadian Olympic Hall of Fame
- Canada's Athletes of the 20th Century
- Lionel Conacher Award (male only)
- List of members of Canada's Sports Hall of Fame
- Lou Marsh Trophy
- Velma Springstead Trophy (female only)
