= Burns (surname) =

Surname

The surname Burns has several origins. In some cases, it derived from the Middle English or Scots burn, and originated as a topographic name for an individual who lived by a stream. In other cases the surname is a variant form of the surname Burnhouse, which originated as a habitational name, derived from a place name made up of the word elements burn and house. In other cases the surname Burns originated as a nickname meaning "burn house". In other cases, the surname Burns is an Anglicised form of the Irish Ó Broin, which means "descendant of Bran". In some cases the surname Burns is an Americanized form of the Jewish surname Bernstein, which is derived from the German bernstein ("amber").

An early form of the surname when derived from the place name Burnhouse is "Burnis", recorded in 1526. An early form of the surname when derived from a nickname meaning "burn house" is "Brenhus", recorded in 1286 and 1275.

== List of notable persons with the surname Burns ==
=== A ===
- Aaron Burns (born 1985), American film producer and actor
- Adrian Burns (born 1971), Australian rules footballer
- Agnes Burns (1762–1834), Scottish social figure
- A. K. Burns (born 1975), American artist
- Alan Burns (disambiguation), multiple people
- Albert Burns (disambiguation), multiple people
- Alayna Burns (born 1980), Australian cyclist
- Alec Burns (runner) (1907–2003), English track and field athlete
- Alec Burns (cricketer) (born 1948), Trinidadian cricketer
- Alex Burns (disambiguation), multiple people
- Alistair Burns (born 1964), English curler
- Allan Burns (disambiguation), multiple people
- Allen Burns (1870–1925), Australian rules footballer
- Andréa Burns (born 1971), American actress and singer
- Andrew Burns (disambiguation), multiple people
- Andy Burns (born 1990), American baseball player
- Angela Burns, British politician and businesswoman
- Anna Burns (born 1962), Northern Irish author
- Anne Burns (1915–2001), British engineer and pilot
- Anne Burns (linguist), Welsh-Australian linguist
- Anthony Burns (disambiguation), multiple people
- Antoine Burns (born 1979), American football player
- Archibald Burns (disambiguation), multiple people
- Archibaldo Burns (1914–2011), Mexican film director and writer
- Arnold Burns (1930–2013), American lawyer
- Arthur Burns (disambiguation), multiple people
- Artie Burns (born 1995), American football player

=== B ===
- Barnabas Burns (1817–1883), American politician and soldier
- Barnet Burns (1805–1860), English sailor
- Barry Burns, Scottish musician
- Bart Burns (1918–2007), American actor
- Beatrice Burns (1906–1988), American political figure
- Ben Burns (1913–2000), American publisher
- Benedict Delisle Burns (1915–2001), British neurophysiologist
- Berta Burns (1893–1972), New Zealand journalist and activist
- Beth Burns (born 1957), American basketball coach
- Beverly Burns (born 1949), American aviator
- Bill Burns (disambiguation), multiple people
- Billy Burns (disambiguation), multiple people
- Billy Joe Burns (born 1989), Northern Irish footballer
- Bob Burns (disambiguation), multiple people
- Bobby Burns (disambiguation), multiple people
- Braidon Burns (born 1996), Australian rugby league footballer
- Breehn Burns, American screenwriter
- Brenda Burns (born 1950), American politician
- Brendon Burns (disambiguation), multiple people
- Brent Burns (born 1985), Canadian hockey player
- Brian Burns (disambiguation), multiple people
- Britt Burns (born 1959), American baseball player
- Brooke Burns (born 1978), American model and actor
- Bruce Burns (born 1952), American politician
- Bryant Burns (1929–2007), Australian politician
- Burnie Burns (born 1973), American writer and filmmaker
- Burton Burns (born 1952), American football coach

=== C ===
- Carol Burns (1947–2015), Australian actor
- Carol J. Burns, American chemist
- Carolyn Burns (born 1942), New Zealand ecologist
- Casey Burns (born 1975), American illustrator
- Catherine Burns (1945–2019), American actress
- Catherine Lloyd Burns (born 1961), American actress and writer
- C. B. Burns (1879–1968), American baseball player
- C. Delisle Burns (1879–1942), English writer
- Cha Burns (1957–2007), Scottish guitarist
- Charles Burns (disambiguation), multiple people
- Chris Burns (disambiguation), multiple people
- Christian Burns (born 1974), British musician
- Christian Burns (basketball) (born 1985), Italian-American basketball player
- Christine Burns (born 1954), British political activist
- Clarence H. Burns (1918–2003), American politician
- Clinton Sumner Burns (1871–1924), American civil engineer
- Colin Burns (born 1982), American soccer player
- Conrad Burns (1935–2016), American politician
- Cory Burns (born 1987), American baseball player
- Creighton Burns (1925–2008), Australian journalist
- Curry Burns (born 1981), American football player

=== D ===
- Dan Burns (born 1988), American lacrosse player
- Darin Burns (born 1964), Canadian football player
- Darren Burns (rugby league) (born 1974), Australian rugby league footballer
- Dave Burns (football manager), Dutch-British football coach
- Dave Burns (sportscaster) (born 1963), American sportscaster
- David Burns (disambiguation), multiple people
- Dawson Burns (1828–1909), English minister
- DeChon Burns (born 1970), American football coach
- Declan Burns (born 1956), Irish canoeist
- Denis Burns (born 1952), Irish hurling manager
- Dennis Burns (1898–1968), American baseball player
- Deondre Burns (born 1997), American basketball player
- DeWayne Burns (born 1972), American politician
- Diann Burns (born 1958), American news anchor
- Dick Burns (1863–1937), American baseball player
- D. J. Burns (born 2000), American basketball player
- Dominic Burns (born 1983), English film director
- Donald Burns (1921–1987), New Zealand cricket umpire
- Donnie Burns (born 1959), British dancer
- Draelon Burns (born 1985), American basketball player
- Duncan Burns, British wrestler

=== E ===
- Éamonn Burns (born 1972), Irish Gaelic footballer
- Éamonn Burns (Down Gaelic footballer) (1963–2019), Irish Gaelic footballer and manager
- Ed Burns (disambiguation), multiple people
- Eddie Burns (1916–2004), Australian rugby league footballer
- Edmund Burns (1892–1980), American actor
- Edward Burns (disambiguation), multiple people
- Eileen Burns (born 1989), Irish cyclist
- Eleanor Burns (born 1945), American quilter
- Elinor Burns (1887–1978), British suffragist
- Elizabeth Burns (disambiguation), multiple people
- Ellen Bree Burns (1923–2019), American judge
- E. L. M. Burns (1897–1985), Canadian Army officer and diplomat
- Emelia Burns (born 1982), Australian actress
- Emile Burns (1889–1972), British author and economist
- Emmett C. Burns Jr. (1940–2022), American politician
- Eric Burns (born 1945), American media critic
- Erin Burns (born 1988), Australian cricketer
- Eugene Burns (1906–1958), American war correspondent
- Eveline M. Burns (1900–1985), British-American economist
- Evers Burns (born 1971), American basketball player

=== F ===
- Farmer Burns (baseball) (1876–??), American baseball player
- F. C. Burns (1890–1915), American football player and businessman
- Findley Burns Jr. (1917–2003), American ambassador
- Frances E. Burns (1866–1937), American social leader and business executive
- Francis Burns (disambiguation), multiple people
- Frank Burns (disambiguation), multiple people
- Frankie Burns (1889–1961), American boxer
- Fred Burns (tennis) (1889–1971), American tennis player
- Fred Burns (actor) (1878–1955), American actor
- Freddie Burns (born 1990), English rugby union footballer
- Frederick William Burns (1860–1923), American sports announcer

=== G ===
- Gene Burns (1940–2013), American radio host
- George Burns (disambiguation), multiple people
- Gerald Burns (1940–1997), American poet
- Gerard M. Burns (born 1961), Scottish painter
- Gilbert Burns (born 1986), Brazilian mixed martial artist
- Gilbert Burns (farmer) (1760–1827), Scottish farmer
- Gill Burns (born 1964), English rugby union footballer
- Glenn Burns (born 1952), American meteorologist
- Gordon Burns (born 1942), Northern Irish broadcaster
- Gordon Burns (footballer) (born 1978), Scottish footballer
- Graeme Burns (born 1971), Scottish rugby union footballer and coach
- Graham Burns (born 1966), British canoeist
- Greg Burns (disambiguation), multiple people
- Gregory Burns (born 1957), American athlete

=== H ===
- Harold Burns (disambiguation), multiple people
- Harriet Burns (1928–2008), American artist
- Harry Burns (disambiguation), multiple people
- Helen Burns (1916–2018), English actress
- Henry Burns (disambiguation), multiple people
- Herbert Burns (born 1988), Brazilian mixed martial artist
- Howard Burns (1939–2025), British architectural historian and professor
- Hugh Burns (disambiguation), multiple people

=== I ===
- Ian Burns (footballer) (1939–2015), Scottish footballer
- Ian Burns (snooker player) (born 1985), English snooker player
- Inez Brown Burns (1886–1976), American socialite
- Irene Burns, American television producer
- Isaac Burns (1869–1946), British trade unionist
- Isabella Burns (1771–1858), Scottish publisher
- Islay Burns (1817–1872), Scottish theologian

=== J ===
- J. Agnes Burns (died 1952), American attorney and politician
- Jabez Burns (1805–1876), English philosopher
- Jack Burns (disambiguation), multiple people
- Jackie Burns (born 1980), American actress
- Jackie Burns (born 1997), Northern Irish footballer
- Jacob Burns (disambiguation), multiple people
- Jaira Burns (born 1997), American singer-songwriter
- Jake Burns (born 1958), Irish musician
- Jake Burns (rugby union) (born 1941), New Zealand rugby union footballer
- James Burns (disambiguation), multiple people
- Jarlath Burns (born 1968), Irish Gaelic footballer
- Jason Burns (American football) (born 1972), American football player
- Jean Burns (1919–2019), Australian aviator
- Jennifer Burns (politician), American politician
- Jerry Burns (1927–2021), American football player and coach
- Jessie Burns, Canadian musician
- J. Frederick Burns, American politician
- J. H. Burns (1921–2012), Scottish historian
- Jim Burns (disambiguation), multiple people
- J. Irving Burns (1843–1925), American lawyer and politician
- Jock Burns (1894–1963), Scottish footballer
- Joel Burns (disambiguation), multiple people
- John Burns (disambiguation), multiple people
- Jon G. Burns (born 1952), American politician
- Jordan Burns (born 1997), American basketball player
- Jordyn Burns (born 1992), American ice hockey player
- Joseph Burns (disambiguation), multiple people
- Josh Burns (fighter) (born 1978), American mixed martial artist
- Josh Burns (politician) (born 1987), Australian politician
- Joy S. Burns, American corporate executive
- J. Stewart Burns (born 1969), American television writer

=== K ===
- Karen Burns (disambiguation), multiple people
- Karl Burns (born 1958), British musician
- Karla Burns (1954–2021), American soprano
- Kat Burns, Canadian musician
- Kay Burns, Canadian artist
- Keith Burns (disambiguation), multiple people
- Ken Burns (born 1953), American filmmaker
- Kennedy Francis Burns (1842–1895), Canadian businessman and politician
- Kenneth Burns (disambiguation), multiple people
- Kevin Burns (disambiguation), multiple people
- Kida Burns (born 2002), American hip-hop dancer
- Kieran Burns (born 1992), Scottish footballer
- Killian Burns (born 1975), Irish Gaelic footballer
- Kit Burns (1831–1870), American sportsman
- Kodi Burns (born 1988), American football coach
- Krysta Burns (born 1996), Canadian curler

=== L ===
- Lamont Burns (born 1974), American former footballer
- Larry Burns (disambiguation), multiple people
- Laura Burns (disambiguation), multiple people
- Lauren Burns (born 1974), Australian taekwondo practitioner
- Lauri Burns, American writer and philanthropist
- Lawton Burns (born 1951), American business theorist
- Lenny Burns, British singer
- Leon Burns (1942–1984), American professional footballer
- Leopoldina Burns (1855–1942), American missionary
- Les Burns (1920–2015), Australian rules footballer
- Liam Burns (born 1978), Northern Irish footballer
- Liam Burns (NUS president) (born 1984), British union leader
- Lilly Burns, American television producer
- Lindsay Burns (born 1965), American rower
- Lindy Burns, Australian radio presenter
- Lizzie Burns (1827–1878), Irish political figure
- Lloyd Burns (born 1984), Welsh rugby union footballer
- Loree Griffin Burns, American author
- Louis Burns (disambiguation), multiple people
- Louisa Burns (1869–1958), American physician
- Louise Burns (born 1985), Canadian singer-songwriter
- Lucy Burns (1879–1966), American suffragist
- Luke F. Burns (1881–1956), American lawyer and politician

=== M ===
- Major Burns (born 2002), American football player
- Malcolm Burns (1910–1986), New Zealand agriculturalist
- M. Anthony Burns (born 1942), American businessman
- Marc Burns (born 1983), Trinidadian athlete
- Margaret Burns (1769–1792), Scottish prostitute
- Marge Burns (1925–2009), American professional golfer
- Margo Burns, American historian
- Marilyn Burns (disambiguation), multiple people
- Marion Burns (1907–1993), American actress
- Marjorie Burns (born 1940), English literary scholar
- Mark Burns (disambiguation), multiple people
- Marsha Burns (born 1945), American photographer
- Martha Burns (born 1957), Canadian actress
- Martin Burns (1861–1937), American wrestler
- Marvin Burns (1928–1990), American water polo player
- Mary Burns (disambiguation), multiple people
- Matthew James Burns (born 1985), Scottish record producer
- Max Burns (born 1948), American politician
- Megan Burns (born 1986), English musician and actor
- Michael Burns (disambiguation), multiple people
- M. Michele Burns (born 1958), American businesswoman
- Morgan Burns (born 1993), American football player
- M. W. Burns (born 1958), American sound artist

=== N ===
- Nathan Burns (born 1988), Australian footballer
- Neal Burns (1892–1969), American actor
- Neil Burns (born 1965), English cricketer
- Neil Burns (footballer) (born 1945), Scottish footballer
- Nellie Marie Burns (1850–1897), American actor and poet
- Nica Burns (born 1954), British theatre producer
- Nicholas Burns (disambiguation), multiple people
- Norm Burns (1918–1995), Canadian ice hockey player

=== O ===
- Olive Ann Burns (1924–1990), American writer
- Otto L. Burns (1868–1941), American politician
- Otway Burns (1775–1850), American privateer
- Owen Burns (disambiguation), multiple people
- Oyster Burns (1864–1928), American baseball player

=== P ===
- Paddy Burns (1881–1943), New Zealand rugby union footballer
- Patrick Burns (disambiguation), multiple people
- Patti Burns (1952–2001), American journalist
- Paul Burns (disambiguation), multiple people
- Pauline Powell Burns (1872–1912), American pianist and artist
- Pete Burns (1959–2016), English musician
- Peter Burns (disambiguation), multiple people

=== R ===
- Ralph Burns (1922–2001), American pianist
- Randal Burns, American computer scientist
- Randy Burns, American music producer
- Randy Burns (singer) (born 1948), American singer-songwriter
- Raymond Burns (disambiguation), multiple people
- Rebecca Burns, American journalist
- Red Burns (1925–2013), Canadian-American academic
- Regan Burns (born 1968), American actor
- Rex Burns (born 1935), American author
- Ric Burns (born 1955), American documentary filmmaker and writer
- Rick Burns, Canadian politician
- Richard Burns (1971–2005), English rally driver
- Ricky Burns (born 1983), Scottish boxer
- R. Nicholas Burns (born 1956), American politician
- Rob Burns (born 1953), New Zealand bass player
- Robert Burns (disambiguation), multiple people
- Ronald Burns (athlete) (1903–1985), Indian sprinter
- Ronnie Burns (actor) (1935–2007), American actor
- Ronnie Burns (footballer) (born 1973), Australian rules footballer
- Ronnie Burns (singer) (born 1946), Australian rock singer-songwriter and musician
- Rory Burns (born 1990), English cricketer
- Roy Burns (disambiguation), multiple people

=== S ===
- Sam Burns (born 1996), American golfer
- Samuel Burns (born 1982), American rower
- Sarah Burns (disambiguation), multiple people
- Scott Burns (disambiguation), multiple people
- Sean Burns (disambiguation), multiple people
- Shernyl Burns (born 1991), West Indian cricketer
- Sheryl Burns, New Zealand netball player
- Silas Reese Burns (1855–1940), American architect
- Síle Burns, Irish camogie player
- Simon Burns (born 1952), British politician
- Stephan W. Burns (1954–1990), American actor
- Stephanie Burns (born 1955), American chemist
- Stephen Burns (disambiguation), multiple people
- Steve Burns (disambiguation), multiple people
- Stewart Burns (1899–?), Scottish golfer
- Sylvia Burns (born 1955), South African lawn bowler

=== T ===
- Tanner Burns (born 1998), American baseball player
- Tara Burns (fl. 1990s–2020s), Irish judge
- Ted Burns (1889–1972), Australian rules footballer
- Terry Burns (disambiguation), multiple people
- Thea Burns, American art conservator
- Theobald M. Burns (1862–1926), Canadian merchant and politician
- Thomas Burns (disambiguation), multiple people
- Tim Burns (disambiguation), multiple people
- Tito Burns (1921–2010), British musician
- Todd Burns (born 1963), American baseball player
- Tommy Burns (disambiguation), multiple people
- Tony Burns (born 1944), English footballer
- Tosher Burns (1902–1984), Irish footballer
- T. P. Burns (1924–2018), Irish jockey
- Travis Burns (disambiguation), multiple people
- Trevor Burns (born 2001), American soccer player

=== U ===
- Ursula Burns (born 1958), American businesswoman

=== V ===
- Veronica Burns (1914–1998), Irish museum curator
- Vincent Burns (1981–2024), American football player

=== W ===
- Waller Thomas Burns (1858–1917), American judge
- Walter Noble Burns (1866–1932), American author
- Wes Burns (born 1994), Welsh footballer
- W. Haydon Burns (1912–1987), American politician
- W. Haywood Burns (1940–1996), American lawyer and activist
- Wilfred Burns (born 1990), British composer
- Wilfred Burns (town planner) (1923–1984), British town planner
- William Burns (disambiguation), multiple people
- Willie Burns (disambiguation), multiple people
- Willis B. Burns (1851–1915), American businessman and politician

=== Z ===
- Zachary Burns (born 1996), American rower

== Fictional characters ==
- Mr. Burns, a character in the television series The Simpsons
- Eunice Burns, a character in the film What's Up, Doc?
- Sir Isambard Burns, a character in Raymond Postgate's novel Verdict of Twelve
- Leonard Burns, a character in the anime and manga Fire Force

== See also ==
- Burnes, a page with people named "Burnes"
- Berns (surname), a page with people with the given surname "Berns"
- Governor Burns (disambiguation), a disambiguation page with Governors surnamed "Burns"
- Lord Burns (disambiguation), a disambiguation page with Lords surnamed "Burns"
- Senator Burns (disambiguation), a disambiguation page with Senators surnamed "Burns"
