= Frank Burns =

Frank Burns may refer to:

- Frank Burns (Pennsylvania politician) (born 1975), Pennsylvania politician
- Frank Burns (Delaware politician), Delaware state representative
- Frank L. Burns (1939–2003), director of the US Army's Delta Force leadership project
- Frank R. Burns (1928–2012), head football coach at Johns Hopkins University and Rutgers University
- Alan Burns (rugby league) (born 1961), also known as Frank, Australian rugby league player
- Frank Burns (M*A*S*H), a character on the television show M*A*S*H

== See also ==
- Arthur Frank Burns, chairman of the Federal Reserve
- Frank Byrne (disambiguation)
- Francis Byrne (disambiguation)
- Francis Burns (disambiguation)
