= Berns (surname) =

Berns is a surname. Notable people with the surname include:

- Alphonse Berns (born 1952), Luxembourg diplomat
- Anton Berns, Dutch scientist
- Augusto Berns (1842–after 1888), German engineer and entrepreneur that rediscovered Machu Picchu
- Bert Berns (1929–1967), American songwriter
- Ilene Berns (1943–2017), American record company director
- Kenneth Berns (1938–2024), American virologist
- Laurence Berns, American philosopher
- Magdalen Berns (1983–2019), British YouTuber and radical feminist activist
- Marguerite Bernes (1901–1996), Algerian nun recognised as Righteous Among the Nations
- Mel Berns (1897–1977), American make-up artist
- Michael W. Berns (1942–2022), American biologist
- Rick Berns (born 1956), American football player
- Rima Berns-McGown, Canadian politician and author
- Sam Berns (1997–2014), American progeria sufferer and campaigner
- Thomas B. Berns (1945–2018), American politician, civil engineer, and surveyor
- Walter Berns (1919–2015), American law professor

== See also ==
- Burns (surname)
