= Edward Burns (disambiguation) =

Edward Burns (born 1968) is an American actor and filmmaker.

Ed, Eddie, or Edward Burns may also refer to:

- Ed Burns (born 1946), American author and screenwriter
- Ed Burns (American football) (born 1954), American football player
- Ed Burns (baseball) (1887–1942), Major League catcher
- Ed "Big Ed" Burns (c. 1842 – c. 1918), American con man
- Eddie Burns (1916–2004), Australian rugby league player
- Eddie "Guitar" Burns (1928–2012), American blues musician
- Edward E. Burns (1858–1941), member of the Wisconsin State Senate
- Edward F. Burns (1931–2019), Pennsylvania politician
- Edward J. Burns (born 1957), Catholic bishop of Dallas
- Ted Burns (1889–1972), Australian rules footballer

== See also ==
- Edward Burns Ross (1881–1947), Scottish mathematician
- Edd Byrnes (1932–2020), American actor
- Edward Byrne (disambiguation)
- Edward Burn (disambiguation)
- Edmund Widdrington Byrne (1844–1904), British judge and politician
- Thomas Edward Burns (born 1927), Ulster unionist politician
- Edmund Burns (1892–1980), American silent film actor
- Ned Burns, member of the Idaho House of Representatives
- Burns (surname)
