= Albert Burns =

Albert Burns may refer to:

- Albert Burns (motorcyclist) (1898–1921), dirt and board track motorcycle racer
- Albert Garrette Burns (1888–1951), president of the National Inventors Congress
- Albert M. Burns (1847–1903), American politician and soldier
