= Nicholas Byrne =

Nicholas Byrne may refer to:

- Nicky Byrne, born 1978, Irish pop singer
- Nicholas Byrne, died circa 1833, proprietor of The Morning Post and father of William Pitt Byrne

== See also ==
- Nicholas Burne, 16th century Scottish controversialist
- Nicholas Burns (disambiguation)
