= Alan Burns =

Alan Burns may refer to:

- Alan Burns, 4th Baron Inverclyde (1897–1957), Scottish nobleman
- Alan Burns (author) (1929–2013), English author
- Alan Burns (colonial administrator) (1887–1980), British colonial administrator and governor
- Alan Burns (computer scientist), professor of computer science
- Alan Burns (rugby league) (born 1961), Australian rugby league footballer
- Alan Burns & Associates, who developed the Movin' radio format

== See also ==
- Allan Burns (disambiguation)
- Allen Burns (1870–1925), Australian rules footballer
- Allen Burns, designer of Ottawa Street Power Station
- Larry Alan Burns (born 1954), United States federal judge
- Alan Byrne (disambiguation)
