= Eric Burns (disambiguation) =

Eric Burns is a media critic, journalist, writer, and former television pundit for Fox News.

Eric Burns may also refer to:

- Eric E. Burns, media consultant, President of Media Matters for America from 2008 to 2011

== See also ==
- Eric Byrnes (born 1976), retired professional baseball player
- Eric Byrne (born 1947), Irish politician
- Burns (surname)
