= List of fellows of the Royal Society elected in 1968 =

This article lists fellows of the Royal Society elected in 1968.

== Fellows ==
1. Ephraim Saul Anderson
2. Leslie Clifford Bateman
3. Donald Eric Broadbent
4. Geoffrey Ronald Burbidge
5. Benedict Delisle Burns
6. Richard Clive Cookson
7. David Parker Craig
8. Dennis John Crisp
9. James Dyson
10. Sir Eric Eastwood
11. Sir George Robert Edwards
12. Trevor Walworth Goodwin
13. Sir Henry Harris
14. Robert Neville Haszeldine
15. Antony Hewish
16. Ioan Mackenzie James
17. Douglas Samuel Jones
18. Anthony David Lees
19. Patrick Loudon Mollison
20. Donald Henry Northcote
21. Phillip Sadler Nutman
22. Donald William Pashley
23. Owen Martin Phillips
24. David Rees
25. Frederick Denys Richardson
26. Sir Michael George Parke Stoker
27. John Crossley Swallow
28. Sir George Taylor
29. Richard Gilbert West
30. David Theodore Nelson Williamson
31. John Tuzo Wilson
32. Sir Michael Francis Addison Woodruff

== Foreign members ==
1. Edoardo Amaldi
2. Adolf Friedrich Johann Butenandt
3. Kurt Gödel
4. Jacques Lucien Monod

== Statute 12 fellows ==
1. Éamon de Valera
2. Sir Robert Eric Mortimer Wheeler
