= Clara Lucas Balfour =

English lecturer and author (1808–1878)

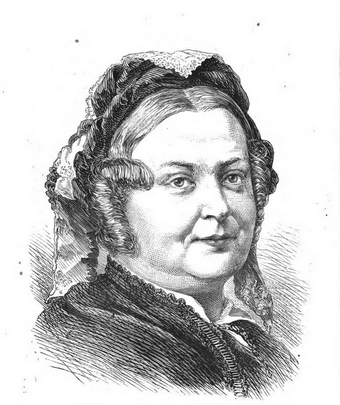
- Born: Clara Lucas Liddell; 21 December 1808; Buckland, Portsmouth, England
- Died: 3 July 1878 (aged 69); Croydon, England
- Occupations: Temperance campaigner, lecturer, author
- Spouse: James Balfour (m. 1824)
- Children: Jabez Balfour

Clara Lucas Balfour (née Liddell; 21 December 1808 – 3 July 1878) was an English temperance campaigner, lecturer and author. For many years, she was associated with the philanthropic movements of her time.

== Early life ==
Clara Lucas Liddell was born in Buckland, near Portsmouth, on 21 December 1808, the only child of John Lydell (c. 1767–1818), a butcher and cattle dealer from Gosport, and his wife Sarah. As stated by Charles Bullock in his biography, and also by the Dictionary of National Biography in 1885, the family name was Liddell, and not Lucas, as claimed by the Oxford Dictionary of National Biography. Lucas was a name given in baptism.

Her parents appear to have separated when she was very young (it was later said that John had deceived Sarah into entering into a bigamous marriage), and Clara went to live with her father on the Isle of Wight. John died in 1818. On 26 April 1818, at Portsea, Clara was baptized into the Church of England, the clergyman noting her date of birth as 21 December 1808. She was taken by her mother to live in London. The two were not well off, and supported themselves by needlework. The mother was highly intellectual, while the daughter was very early in life characterised by a love of reading and of elocutionary exercises.

On 26 September 1824, at St Giles in the Fields, signing her name as Clara Lucas Lyddell, she married James Balfour, and they made a home in Chelsea.

In the 1841 United Kingdom census for St Luke, Chelsea, James Balfour's occupation is stated as "Broker" and James and Clara's eldest child, Arthur, aged 13, is recorded as a bookseller. The family had no servants.

Balfour later served in the Ways and Means Office of the House of Commons and in 1861 was described as a Messenger.

== Career ==
=== Activist ===
In October 1837, James, an alcoholic, took a temperance pledge. A week or so later, Balfour also took the pledge; this was at the Bible Christians' chapel, a meeting-place close by her house. Having adopted teetotalism, Clara then contacted Jabez Burns in 1840, and became a Baptist convert.

At first she was content with merely setting an example of total abstinence; but in face of the awful ravages committed by drunkenness, she advanced a step further, and stood forward as an active member of the temperance reformation crusade. The first to receive attention, and corresponding benefit, were the women of Chelsea. A larger constituency was then addressed through the press, so that Balfour was one of the first of the teetotal litterateurs. Having taken the pen in hand, she appears to have understood that she had discovered her avocation, and she gave her attention to other matters more or less associated with the welfare of the industrial classes. At the time, Chelsea was "troubled with Socialism", and Balfour was happy to contend with it through well-written pieces, exposing the pernicious fallacies of the system, which had the effect of breaking up the Chelsea society.

In the period 1837 to 1840, Balfour wrote Common Sense versus Socialism, a tract directed at a local Owenite group. Jane Carlyle called to thank her, and began a friendship. Importantly in practical terms, around this time Balfour also met the campaigner John Dunlop of Gairbraid. He gave her paid editorial work on the Temperance Journal in 1841.

Balfour's last public appearance was at the Memorial Hall, Farringdon Street, in May 1877, when she was elected president of the British Women's Temperance Association.

=== Lecturer ===
Balfour and her family moved from Chelsea to Maida Hill in 1841; and it was at this time that she began the work of public lecturing with which her name became associated. The first lecture was given at the Greenwich Literary Institution; and abundant success attended the somewhat startling innovation. Whatever prejudice existed always broke down after a single hearing. On one occasion a gentleman at the close of the evening rose to apologize most chivalrously as the only member of the Committee who had voted against Balfour's being invited to lecture. As she repeated her attempts, her fame increased, applications for service became correspondingly numerous, and she visited all the great towns in the UK. Her lectures were not confined to the temperance topic. She lectured on the influence of woman on society, and kindred subjects; and she held the post for some years of lecturer on belles lettres at a leading ladies' school.

Amongst her wide range of lectures was one on "The most distinguished Female Sovereigns of Europe" given in the Scientific Institution, Wisbech in 1851, another was "Henry the Eighth and his Six Wives" delivered at the Southport Town Hall Literary Lectures on 8 February 1866.

The lectures were not sermons, but their tone was always decidedly Christian, and, they were occasionally the means of clearing the debts of struggling literary institutes. This work continued with uninterrupted success for 29 years, until she was physically unable to continue.

=== Writer ===
As an author, Balfour attained considerable celebrity, and rendered important services to her generation. Her Women of Scripture passed through nine editions. The spirit in which this work was undertaken could be inferred from the preface, in which the author expressed her belief "that, whether for the social interests of man or woman, the only wisdom and philosophy really practical is the wisdom of Scripture and the philosophy of the New Testament." This volume was followed by Moral Heroism; the Trials and Triumphs of the Great and Good, a very attractive book for young people, of which an illustrated edition was issued. Up-hill Work was a narrative, an attempt "to show in a familiar form that blending of earthly effort with heavenly faith, which alone constitutes real self-help." These were followed by Happy Evenings; a Home Record, a book the aim of which was explained in the title. Sunbeams for all Seasons; a Selected Series of Precepts, Counsels, and Cautions, relating to the Hopes, Pleasures, and Sorrows of Life went through several editions, and A Whisper to a Newly Married Pair went through 23 editions. Lilian's Trial was being published at the time of Balfour's death, in The Fireside; Job Tufton appeared in 1882 in the National Temperance publications; and The Burmish Family and The Manor Mystery were other tales brought out posthumously.

Her publications mostly advocated temperance, but also with a theological aim, and covering varied topics, had an immense sale, and were very numerous. Balfour contributed many of her shorter tales, in the first instance to the British Workman, Day of Days, Hand and Heart, Animal World, Meliora, Family Visitor, Home Words, The Fireside, Band of Hope Review, and the Onward series. Others were issued as Social Science Tracts, and some published by the Scottish and the British Temperance Leagues. Her temperance tales – "Troubled Waters", "The Burnish Family", "Light at Last", "Drift; a Story of Waifs and Strays" and "Retribution" – were extensively circulated. "Sketches of English Literature", "Morning Dewdrops" and "Working Women of the Nineteenth Century" held a high place in public esteem.

Most of Balfour's writing was as a contributor to periodical literature. She was impressed with the importance of utilizing the modern demand for magazine reading by an abundant supply of high-toned and attractive literature. One of the first writers in The Fireside, she continued its "long, fast friend", her last serial story, "Lilian's Trial; or, Darkness before Dawn," appearing in its pages. "Home Makers, and How They Made Them," and "Motherly Words to Mothers," enriched two or three of the volumes of Home Words. These papers embody the practical teachings of her life's experience, derived mainly from personal observation and knowledge. The charm of kindly motherly sympathy which pervaded them, greatly added to their value.

It was noted that, as an author, Balfour, by the very titles of her works, indicated the practical tone of her mind, and her anxious desire ever "to write with a purpose". Highly gifted as a tale writer, she never yielded to the temptation to confine herself to the simply recreative side of literature. Although she well knew the good service a good tale may render, she was equally sensible of the need of reining in the undue appetite for ever-heightened fiction. On this point she thus wrote in a private letter saying, "I am unhappy at the increasing tendency of the age towards fiction only, and often have some mental, nay spiritual conflict, on the subject. I think I have tried to use my imagination to promote what is good. I hope so; but as the evening draws near, I must, if permitted to write at all, be more zealous for higher efforts and more lasting duties."

== Personal life ==
Clara and James Balfour had seven children, of whom four survived to adulthood. One son was Jabez Balfour, later mayor of Croydon, Liberal M.P. for Tamworth, and fraudster. A daughter, Cecile, married Dawson Burns, son of Jabez Burns. She died at Croydon on 3 July 1878, and was buried at the Paddington Cemetery. Rev. Dawson Burns preached her memorial discourse (later published) in the Church Street Chapel, Edgware Road.

James Balfour survived his wife and died at 88 London Road, Croydon, on 22 December 1884, leaving an estate valued for probate at £4089. His executors were his sons John Lucas Balfour, James Lucas Balfour, and Jabez Spencer Balfour.

A newspaper obituary described Balfour as "a well-known politician" and gave his age at death as 88. It said he had been a member of the Friends of the People and had been part of the escort party which had accompanied Francis Burdett when he was committed to the Tower of London. In 1853 he had received an appointment in the House of Commons.

== Selected works ==
Women Worth Emulating (1877)

- Moral Heroism (1846)
- Women of Scripture (1847)
- Women and the Temperance Movement (1849)
- A Whisper to the Newly Married (1850) Editor of an 1824 work by Margaret G. Derenzy.
- Happy Evenings (1851)
- Sketches of English Literature (1852)
- Two Christmas Days (1852)
- Morning Dew Drops, with preface by Harriet Beecher Stowe (1853)
- Working Women and several short sketches, as "Instructors" of Anna Barbauld, Mrs. Trimmer, Mrs. Sherman, Hannah More and others (1854)
- Introductory Essay to Ann Taylor's Maternal Solicitude (1855)
- Bands of Hope (1857)
- Dr. Lignum's Sliding Scale (1858)
- Frank's Sunday Coat (1860)
- Scrub (1860)
- Toil and Trust (1860)
- The Victim (1860)
- The Warning (1860)
- The Two Homes (1860)
- Sunbeams for all Seasons (1861)
- Drift (1861)
- Uphill Work (1861)
- Homely Hints on Household Management (1862)
- Confessions of a Decanter (1862)
- History of a Shilling (1862)
- Wanderings of a Bible (1862)
- A Mother's Sermon (1862)
- Our Old October (1863)
- Cousin Bessie (1863)
- Hope for Number Two (1863)
- A Little Voice (1863)
- A Peep out of the Window (1863)
- Club Night (1864)
- Troubled Waters (1864)
- Cruelty and Cowardice (1866)
- Bible Patterns of Good Women (1867)
- Ways and Means (1868)
- Harry Wilson (1870)
- One by Herself (1872)
- All but Lost (1873)
- Ethel's Strange Lodger (1873)
- Lame Dick's Lantern (1874)
- Light at Last (1874)
- Women Worth Emulating (1877)
- Home Makers (1878)
