= Patrick O'Byrne =

Patrick O'Byrne may refer to:

- Patrick O'Byrne (pianist)
- Patrick O'Byrne (politician)

== See also ==
- Paddy O'Byrne, Irish radio broadcaster and actor
- Patrick Byrne (disambiguation)
