= Stephen Burns (disambiguation) =

Stephen Burns is an American musician.

Stephen or Steve Burns is also the name of:

- Stephen G. Burns, chairman, Nuclear Regulatory Commission
- Stephen L. Burns, American author
- Stephen W. Burns (1954–1990), American actor
- Stephen Burns, chairman of Wheaton World Wide Moving
- Steve Burns (born 1973), American musician, actor, and former children's television show host
- Steve Burns (soccer), American soccer coach
- Steve Burns, founder and former CEO of Workhorse Group

== See also ==
- Steve Byrnes (1959–2015), American television announcer
- Steve Byrne (born 1974), American comedian
- Stephen Byrne (disambiguation)
- Burns (surname)
