= Mark Burns =

Mark Burns may refer to:

- Mark Burns (actor) (1936–2007), English film and television actor
- Mark Burns (cricketer) (born 1967), English cricketer
- Mark Burns (pastor) (born 1979), Christian pastor and founder of the NOW Television Network
- Mark Burns (photographer) (born 1958), American landscape photographer
- Mark Burns (rugby league) (born 1974), professional rugby league footballer for Scotland
- Mark F. Burns (1841–1898), American politician
