= Nicholas Burns =

Nicholas Burns may refer to:

- R. Nicholas Burns (born 1956), US Ambassador to China
- Nicholas Burns (actor) (born 1977), British actor
- Nick Burns, a character in the Saturday Night Live sketch, "Nick Burns, Your Company's Computer Guy"
- Nick Burns, a human in the animated series Challenge of the GoBots

== See also ==
- Nicholas Burne, Scottish Catholic controversialist
- Nicholas Byrne (disambiguation)
