= Paul Byrne =

Paul Byrne may refer to:

- Paul Byrne (footballer, born 1972), Irish footballer, former Celtic and Southend United player
- Paul Byrne (soccer, born 1982), South African footballer, former Port Vale player
- Paul Byrne (footballer, born 1986), Irish football player currently at Ballarat Red Devils
- Paul Byrne (hurler) (born 1949), Irish retired hurler
- Paul Byrne (journalist) (born 1978), Irish journalist, formerly of the BBC and RT
- Paul Byrne (runner) (born 1976), Australian gold medalist at the 1994 World Junior Championships in Athletics
- Paul L. Byrne, served in the California legislature
- P. J. Byrne (Paul Jeffrey Byrne, born 1974), American film and television actor
- Paul Byrne, Irishman who disappeared in 2009, see killing of Paul Byrne

== See also ==
- Paul Burns (disambiguation)
- Paul Bern (1889–1932), American film producer
