= Allan Burns (disambiguation) =

Allan Burns (1935–2021) was an American screenwriter.

Allan Burns may also refer to:

- Allan Burns (surgeon) (1781–1813), Scottish surgeon

== See also ==
- Alan Burns (disambiguation)
- Allen Burns (footballer) (1870–1925), Australian rules footballer
