= Harry Byrne (disambiguation) =

Harry Byrne is an Irish rugby player.

Harry Byrne may also refer to:

- Harry Byrne (sailor)
- Harry Byrne, fictional character in Holby City, son of Faye Byrne

== See also ==
- Henry Byrne (disambiguation)
- Harry Burns (disambiguation)
