= Dawson Burns =

British minister and activist (1828–1909)

Dawson Burns (22 January 1828 – 22 August 1909) was an English Baptist minister and temperance activist.

== Life ==
Born at Southwark on 22 January 1828, he was a younger son of Jabez Burns, Baptist minister of New Church Street Chapel on Edgware Road, a temperance advocate from 1836. His mother was Jane, daughter of George Dawson of Keighley. At twelve, Dawson Burns took the pledge and addressed the young members of his father's congregation in New Church Street.

In February 1845, he became assistant secretary to the National Temperance Society, and a year later joint secretary, editing its monthly organ, the Temperance Chronicle. He was an official reporter of the World's Convention held in August 1846, in which his father took a prominent part. From September 1847 to 1850, he studied at the General Baptist College, then at Leicester, becoming pastor of the Baptist chapel at Salford in September 1851. In 1853, he helped Nathaniel Card, a Quaker, to found the United Kingdom Alliance in Manchester with a view to influencing the licensing laws. He was in London in March 1853 as metropolitan superintendent, and was enrolled as the sixth member on 1 June 1853.

Living in North London, he worked for the temperance cause. He was made an hon. M.A. of Bates College, Maine, U.S., in 1869 and afterwards D.D. On his father's death in 1876 he took over the pastorate of New Church Street Chapel, where he had assisted, but resigned it in 1881, to devote himself to temperance work.

He represented the New Connexion of General Baptists at the centennial conference in America in 1880, acted as secretary to the Temperance Hospital opened in 1881, and was president of the Association of General Baptists held at Norwich in the same year. He promoted temperance legislation, holding that the law should protect the public and not the liquor trade.

Burns died at Battersea on 22 August 1909, aged 81, and was buried at Paddington.

== Liberator Building Society ==
Burns was a director of the Liberator Building Society, which his brother-in-law, Jabez Balfour, founded in 1868 and of which Balfour was chairman. Disapproving of an increase of directors' fees, Burns resigned, before the society's failure in October 1892. Subsequently, Balfour and other directors were convicted of fraud and sentenced to terms of imprisonment.

== Works ==
When still young, he wrote ‘A Plea for Youths' Temperance Societies' and contributed articles to the Weekly Temperance Journal and the National Temperance Advocate. From March 1856 he wrote a ‘London Letter' for the Alliance News (weekly) and published books and pamphlets. He edited Graham's Annual Temperance Guide from 1867 to 1876.

Among Burns's numerous publications are:

- ‘Mormonism Exposed,' 1853.
- ‘Scripture Light on Intoxicating Liquors,' 1859.
- ‘The Temperance Dictionary,' Nos. 1–34, 1861.
- (With Frederic Richard Lees) ‘The Temperance Bible Commentary,' 1868; other editions, 1872, 1876, 1880, 1894.
- ‘Statistics of the Liquor Traffic,' 1872.
- ‘Temperance Ballads,' 1884. 7. ‘Local Option,' 1885, 3rd edit. 1896; new standard edit. 1909.
- ‘Temperance History,' 2 vols. 1889–91.
- ‘The Bible and Temperance Reform: the Lees and Raper Memorial Lecture,' 1906.
- ‘Country Walks and Temperance Talks,' 1901.

In a series of annual letters to The Times (1886–1909), on the ‘National Drink Bill', he cited facts and statistics.

== Family ==
On 22 December 1853, he married Cecile, only daughter of James and Clara Lucas Balfour. His wife died at Battersea on 27 March 1897; of his five sons and a daughter, only two sons survived him. Burns wrote memoirs of his wife and of his third son, Edward Spenser Burns (1861–1885), who died on 1 March 1885 at Leopoldville, Stanley Pool (now Kinshasa, Democratic Republic of the Congo) on a mission for the International African Association in the Congo district, opening up a new route towards the Kouilou-Niari River, and constructing charts.
