= Archibald Burns =

Archibald Burns may refer to:

- Archibald Burns (photographer) (1831–1880), Scottish photographer
- Archibald Burns (politician) (1867–1950), member of the New Zealand Legislative Council

== See also ==
- Archibaldo Burns (1914–2011), Mexican writer and film director
