= James Dyson (physicist) =

British physicist (1914–1990)

James Dyson FRS (10 December 1914 – 22 January 1990) was a British physicist who specialized in optics.

Dyson was the son of a joiner and cabinet maker with a flair for invention. In October 1939 he was living in Rugby, Warwickshire, and was an instrument transformer design engineer. After working in the Research Laboratory of Associated Electrical Industries, he joined the Optics Division of the National Physical Laboratory. Dyson was elected a Fellow of the Royal Society (FRS) in 1968.
