= Alex Burns =

Alex or Alexander Burns may refer to:

- Alex Burns (footballer) (born 1973), former Scottish footballer
- Alex Burns (journalist) (born 1986), American political reporter for The New York Times
- Alexander Burns (minister) (1834–1900), Northern Ireland-born minister and educator in Canada

== See also ==
- Sir Alexander Burnes (1805–1841), Scottish traveller and explorer
