= Edward Burn =

Edward Burn may refer to:

- Edward Burn (cleric) (1762–1837), English Calvinist Methodist preacher and polemical writer
- Edward Burn (legal scholar) (1922–2019), English barrister and legal scholar

== See also ==
- Edward Burne-Jones (1833–1898), English painter and designer
- Edward Burns (disambiguation)
