= Joseph Byrne =

Joseph Byrne may refer to:

- Joseph Byrne (Australian politician) (1893–1973), Australian politician, representing Parramatta
- Joseph Byrne (bishop) (1843–1901), Australian Roman Catholic Bishop of Bathurst
- Joseph Byrne (British Army officer) (1874–1942), Royal Irish Constabulary's Inspector-General, 1916–1920
- Joseph Byrne (Holby City), a fictional character in the BBC medical drama Holby City
- Joe Byrne (1856–1880), Australian bushranger and member of the Kelly Gang
- Joe Byrne (Northern Ireland politician) (1953–2025), nationalist politician in Northern Ireland
- Joe Byrne, Newfoundland folk musician, see Pat and Joe Byrne
- Joseph R. Byrne (1921–1990), Newfoundland hockey coach from Quebec
- Joe Byrne (Canadian politician) (born 1961), leader of the New Democratic Party of Prince Edward Island

== See also ==
- Joseph Burn (1871–1950), chairman of the Prudential Insurance company
- Joseph Burns (disambiguation)
