= Edward Byrne =

Edward, Ed, Ned, or Eddie Byrne may refer to:

- Edward Byrne (police officer) (1966–1988), murdered US police officer
- Edward Abraham Byrne (1864–1938), Irish-American civil engineer
- Edward 'Doc' Byrne, journalist and newspaper editor
- Edward Gerald Byrne (1912–2003), New Brunswick politician
- Edward Joseph Byrne (1872–1940), Irish prelate of the Roman Catholic Church
- Ed Byrne (comedian) (born 1972), Irish comedian
- Ed Byrne (musician), American trombonist, composer and bandleader
- Ed Byrne (neuroscientist) (born 1952), neuroscientist and principal of King's College London
- Ed Byrne (Canadian politician) (born 1963), Canadian politician
- Ed Byrne (American politician), member of the Montana House of Representatives
- Ed Byrne (rugby union) (born 1993), Irish rugby union player
- Eddie Byrne (1911–1981), Irish actor
- Eddie Byrne (footballer) (born 1951), Irish footballer
- Eddie Byrne (hurler) (1905–1944), Irish hurler
- Ned Byrne (born 1948), Irish hurler and rugby player

== See also ==
- Edward Burns (disambiguation)
- Edward Burne-Jones (1833–1898), English artist and designer
- Edd Byrnes (1932–2020), American actor
- Edmund Widdrington Byrne (1844–1904), British judge and politician
