= Kenneth Burns =

Kenneth Burns may refer to:

- Ken Burns (born 1953), American documentary film producer
- Ken Burns (footballer) (1923–2006), Manx footballer
- Ken Burns (referee) (1931–2016), English football referee
- Kenneth C. "Jethro" Burns (1920–1989), American country musician
- Kenny Burns (born 1953), Scottish footballer
- "Ken Burns", early alias of Swedish rapper Bladee

== See also ==
- Kenneth Berns, American virologist
- Kenneth Burn (1862–1956), Australian cricketer
