= Honora Enfield =

British co-operative activist

- Born: Alice Honora Enfield; 4 January 1882; Nottingham, England
- Died: 14 August 1935 (aged 53); Paris, France
- Education: St Leonards School; Somerville College
- Movement: Co-operative; Peace; Women's
- Relatives: Elinor Enfield (sister)

Alice Honora Enfield (4 January 1882 – 14 August 1935) was a British co-operative activist.

== Life and career ==
Born in Nottingham, she was the sister of Elinor Enfield. Alice studied at St Leonards School in St Andrews, and then at Somerville College, Oxford University. She became a secondary school teacher, also undertaking research in history in her spare time.

In 1913, Enfield began working for the National Federation of Women Workers, focusing on campaigning for better benefits for women under the National Health Insurance scheme. Four years later, she instead took employment with the Women's Co-operative Guild, as private secretary to Margaret Llewelyn Davies. Davies retired as secretary of the organisation in 1922, and Enfield replaced her.

Enfield was a founder of the International Women's Co-operative Guild in 1921, and became its first secretary, the following year. The role gradually expanded, and in 1927 she resigned her other posts to work full-time for the international organisation.

In her spare time, Enfield was involved in the peace movement, serving on the National Peace Council, and during 1932 on the Disarmament Committee of the International Women's Organisations. She died in 1935, while visiting Paris in an attempt to organise a women's co-operative guild there.

Non-profit organization positions
Preceded by Margaret Llewelyn Davies	Secretary of the Women's Co-operative Guild; 1922–1927	Succeeded by Eleanor Barton
