= Alan Byrne =

Alan Byrne may refer to:

- Alan Byrne (footballer, born 1969), Irish football (soccer) player
- Alan Byrne (Gaelic footballer), Wicklow intercounty footballer
- Alan Byrne (hurler) (born 1985), Irish hurler

== See also ==
- Alan Burns (disambiguation)
