= Louis Burns =

Louis Burns may refer to:

- Louis F. Burns (Osage, 1920–2012), author and historian
- Louis Henry Burns (1878–1928), United States federal judge

== See also ==
- Burns (surname)
