= Stephen Byrne =

Stephen Byrne is the name of:

- Stephen Byrne (broadcaster), Irish vlogger and television personality
- Stephen Byrne (comics) (born 1986), Irish artist and animator
- Stephen Byrne (hurler) (born 1977), Irish hurler

== See also ==
- Steve Byrne (born 1974), American stand-up comedian and actor
- Steve Byrnes (1959–2015), American television announcer and producer
- Steve Byrne, member of Scottish folk band Malinky
- Steve Byrne, member of English new wave band Freeze Frame
- Stephen Burns (disambiguation)
