= George Burns (disambiguation) =

George Burns (1896–1996) was an American comedian and actor.

George Burns may also refer to:

== Business ==
- Sir George Burns, 1st Baronet (1795–1890), Scottish shipping magnate
- George Burns, 2nd Baron Inverclyde (1861–1905), owner of a Scottish shipping company

== Politics ==
- George Burns (American politician), member of the Oklahoma Senate
- George Burns (Australian politician) (1869–1932), member of the Australian House of Representatives
- George Burns (Queensland politician) (1845–1893), member of the Queensland Legislative Assembly

== Sports ==
- George Burns (first baseman) (1893–1978), American League baseball player
- George Burns (golfer) (born 1949), American golfer
- George Burns (outfielder) (1889–1966), National League baseball player
- George Burns (rowing) (1919–1995), New Zealand coxswain

== Other ==
- George Burns (British Army officer) (1911–1997), British general

== See also ==
- Burns (surname)
- George Bruns (1914–1983), American film composer
- George Byrne (1892–1973), English cricketer
