= Senator Byrnes =

Senator Byrnes or Byrns may refer to:

- James F. Byrnes (1882–1972), U.S. Senator from South Carolina
- Jo Byrns (1869–1936), Tennessee State Senate
- John W. Byrnes (1913–1985), Wisconsin State Senate
- Samuel Byrns (1848–1914), Missouri State Senate

== See also ==
- Senator Burns (disambiguation)
- Senator Byrne (disambiguation)
