= Burnes =

Burnes is an English surname. Notable people with the surname include:

- Alexander Burnes (1805–1841), Scottish explorer, military officer and diplomat
- Corbin Burnes (born 1994), American baseball player
- Daniel D. Burnes (1851–1899), U.S. Representative from Missouri
- David Burnes (1739–1799), 18th-century American farmer
- George Burnes (1866–1949), New Zealand businessman and cricketer
- James Burnes (disambiguation), multiple people with the name
- John David Burnes (born 1988), Canadian archer
- John Francis Burnes (1883–1918), American United States Marine Corps officer
- Linda Burnes Bolton (1948–2025), American nurse and healthcare administrator
- Robert Burnes (1719–1789), uncle of the poet Robert Burns, brother of William
- William Burnes (1721–1784), father of the poet Robert Burns, brother of Robert

== See also ==
- Caroline Burnes, a pseudonym of Carolyn Haines
- Burns (surname)
