= Senator Byrne =

Senator Byrne may refer to:

- Bradley Byrne (born 1955), Alabama State Senate
- Frank M. Byrne (1858–1927), South Dakota State Senate
- Gary Byrne (politician) (fl. 2020s), Indiana State Senate
- Hugh Byrne (Fianna Fáil politician) (born 1943), Irish Fianna Fáil Senator
- John F. Byrne Sr. (1911–1965), Pennsylvania State Senate
- John F. Byrne Jr. (born 1935), Pennsylvania State Senate
- Leslie Byrne (born 1946), Virginia State Senate
- Maria Byrne (born 1967), Irish Fine Gael Senator
- Paul L. Byrne (1910–1962), California State Senate
- Robert Byrne (North Dakota politician) (1886–1967), North Dakota State Senate
- William T. Byrne (1876–1952), New York State Senate

== See also ==
- Harry T. Burn (1895–1977), Tennessee State Senate
- Senator Byrnes (disambiguation)
