= Henry Byrne =

Henry Byrne may refer to:

- Henry Byrne (politician), Irish politician
- Henry Byrne (judge) (fl. 1810s), Puisne Justice of the Supreme Court of Ceylon
- Henry Byrne (police officer), Irish police officer murdered in 1980

== See also ==
- Henry Burns (disambiguation)
- Harry Byrne (disambiguation)
- Henry de Burne, MP
