= Philippe Saunier =

French art historian

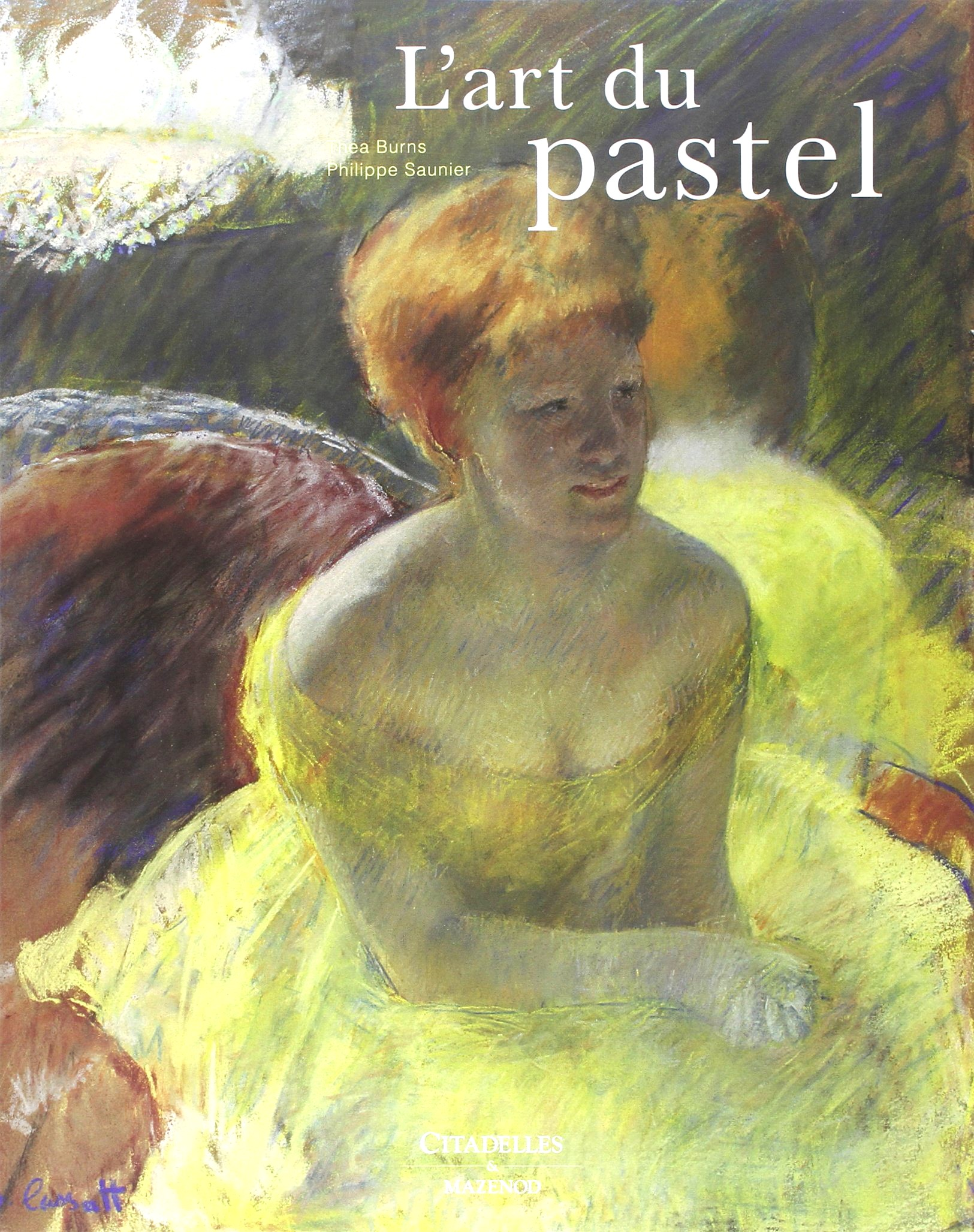
The cover of L'art du pastel, 2014, showing Mary Cassatt's Lydia Leaning on Her Arms (in a theatre box). Pastel, 1879.

Philippe Saunier (born 1972) is a French art historian who is chief curator at the Bureau de l'inventaire des collections et de la circulation des biens culturels at the Ministry of Culture of France. He was formerly with the Musée d'Orsay and the Musée Picasso in Paris. He is the author with Thea Burns of L'art du pastel (2014) which was translated into English and published by Abbeville Press in 2015 as The art of the pastel.

== Career ==
From 2004 to 2006, Saunier was a curator at the Musée de l'Orangerie in Paris. From 2006 to 2007, he was personal advisor for archeology and museums in the office of Renaud Donnedieu de Vabres, a French Minister of Culture and Communication. From 2007 to 2008, he was a curator at the Musée Picasso in Paris. He was the commissioner of the exhibition Picasso and his Collection and wrote the catalogue for the exhibition with Anne Baldassari which was published by the Queensland Art Gallery in Australia in 2008. Later, he was a curator of paintings and pastels at the Musée d'Orsay .

Saunier is now chief curator at the Bureau de l'inventaire des collections et de la circulation des biens culturels at ministry of culture.

Saunier is the author with Thea Burns of L'art du pastel (2014) which was translated into English and published by Abbeville Press in 2015 as The art of the pastel. The book was described by the publishers as "The only comprehensive history of pastel art".

== Selected publications ==
=== French ===
- « Au nom du nom. À propos de Ceci n'est pas qu'un tableau », Lectures, 2015 (record of Bernard Lahire, Ceci n'est pas qu'un tableau. Essai sur l'art, la domination, la magie et le sacré, Paris, coll. « Laboratoire des sciences sociales », 2015, 550 p., ISBN 9782707185211)
- L'art du pastel. Citadelles et Mazenod, 2014. (With Thea Burns) ISBN 978-2850886003
- « L’exemple anglais (Ruskin, Morris) : extension du domaine de l’art », L’Art social de la Révolution à la Grande Guerre, Presses universitaires de Rennes, 2014
- Le voyage. Hachette, 2011. (With Rosa Djaoud) ISBN 978-2011711991
- « Ernest Chesneau (1833-1890) », Dictionnaire critique des historiens de l'art, INHA, 2011
- Degas. Yokohama Museum of Art, Yokohama, 2010. (contributor)
- « L’ethos protestant de Bouguereau », 48/14, n°30, 2010
- « Le paysage, horizon de la peinture (1780-1820) », Voir l’Italie et mourir, exhibition catalog, musée d’Orsay, 2009
- « El pastel en Degas : un material necesario », Degas, el proceso de la creación, exhibition catalog, Fundacion Mapfre, Madrid, 2008
- « Préraphaélisme et esthétisme en France : vingt ans d’effusion lyrique en France (1880-1900) », Histoires littéraires, 2007, n°29
- « Voir Mettray. L’architecture de la colonie », actes du colloque Eduquer et punir, Presses universitaires de Rennes, 2005 ISBN 978-2-7535-2891-8
- Les couleurs du ciel: vitraux de création au XXe siècle dans les cathédrales de France. Henri Gaud, Moisenay, 2002. ISBN 978-2840800934
- « Les préraphaélites anglais : les reproductions de leurs œuvres et leur réception au XIXe siècle en France », Revue de l’art, 2002-3
- « Edward Burne-Jones et la France : Madeleine Deslandes, une préraphaélite oubliée », Revue de l’art, 1999-1
- Preface of the reissue of the poems by Dante Gabriel Rossetti, La Maison de Vie, translation by Clémence Couve (1887), éditions Ressouvenances, Coeuvres-et-Valsery, 1999

=== English ===
- « Bourdieu the Heresiarch. When Bourdieu Revisits Edouard Manet », Books&Ideas.net, 2015
- The art of the pastel. Abbeville Press, London, 2015. (With Thea Burns) (Translated by Elizabeth Heard) ISBN 978-0789212405
- Picasso & his collection. Queensland Art Gallery, Brisbane, 2008. (With Anne Baldassari) (ISBN 9781876509330)
