= Kevin Burns (disambiguation) =

Kevin Burns (1955–2020) was an American television and film producer, director, and screenwriter.

Kevin Burns may also refer to:

- Kevin Burns (cricketer) (born 1960), New Zealand cricketer
- Kevin Burns (fighter) (born 1980), American mixed martial artist
- Kevin Burns (mayor) (born 1958), mayor of North Miami, Florida, 2005–2009
- Kevin Burns (soccer) (born 1985), American soccer player
- Kevin Burns (swimmer) (born 1955), British Olympic swimmer
- Kevin Burns (business magnate), former CEO of Juul
