= Mike Pohanka =

American politician

Member of the Idaho House of Representatives from the 26th district
- Incumbent
- Assumed office December 5, 2024 Serving with Jack Nelsen
- Preceded by: Ned Burns

Personal details
- Born: Twin Falls, Idaho
- Party: Republican
- Website: mikepohanka.com

Mike Pohanka is an American politician who is currently serving as a Republican member of the Idaho House of Representatives, representing the 26th district. The district contains Blaine, Lincoln and Jerome counties. Pohanka worked for Idaho Power for 30 years.

In the 2024 Idaho House of Representatives election, he defeated Democrat Ned Burns.
