= Les Burns =

Australian rules footballer

Personal information
- Full name: Les Burns
- Born: 23 February 1920
- Died: 21 June 2015 (aged 95)
- Original team: Prahran Rovers
- Height: 178 cm (5 ft 10 in)
- Weight: 80 kg (176 lb)

Playing career^{1}
Years	Club	Games (Goals)
1945	St Kilda	7 (0)
- ^{1} Playing statistics correct to the end of 1945.

Les Burns (23 February 1920 – 21 June 2015) was an Australian rules footballer who played with St Kilda in the Victorian Football League (VFL).
