= Joel Burns =

Joel Burns may refer to:

- Joel Burns (basketball) (born 1975), an American basketball player,
- Joel Burns (politician) (born 1969), an American politician.
