= Loree Griffin Burns =

American scientist and children's book writer

Loree Griffin Burns is an American scientist and children's book author focusing on science and the scientific method.

== Early life ==
Burns grew up in Massachusetts. She studied biology at Worcester Polytechnic Institute and graduated with her Bachelor of Science in 1991. She received her Master of Fine Arts in Creative Nonfiction from Bay Path University. She received her PhD in biochemistry from University of Massachusetts Medical School, focusing her studies on yeast gene regulation.

== Career ==
Before becoming an author, Burns worked as a research scientist. She wrote her first book in 2007 entitled Tracking Trash: Flotsam, Jetsam, and the Science of Ocean Motion after she became fascinated by the story of a shipping accident wherein thousands of bathtub toys were lost at sea, only to later wash ashore in New England. She is the author of several books of children’s nonfiction, including the middle grade titles Tracking Trash, The Hive Detectives, Citizen Scientists, Beetle Busters, and Life on Surtsey, as well as the picture books Handle with Care and You’re Invited to a Moth Ball. These books have been awarded American Library Association Notable designations, a Boston Globe–Horn Book Honor Book Award, an IRA Children’s Book Award, a Green Earth Book Award, and two Science Books & Films (SB&F) Prizes. She is also on the faculty list of Vermont College of Fine Arts.

== Recognition ==
Her accolades include:

- American Library Association Notable Lists - 2018 Notable Children's Books
- Boston Globe-Horn Book Award - 2007 Nonfiction Honor Book
- International Reading Association Children’s Book Award
- two AAAS Science Books & Films prizes.

== Published books ==
- Tracking trash flotsam, jetsam, and the science of ocean motion. Houghton Mifflin Harcourt. 2018. ISBN 9780547488936. OCLC 1079389067.
- The hive detectives : chronicle of a honey bee catastrophe. Scholastic. 2014. ISBN 9780545663304. OCLC 872282855.
- Burns, Loree Griffin (14 February 2012). Citizen scientists : be a part of scientific discovery from your own backyard. Macmillan. ISBN 9780805090628. OCLC 988097722.
- Handle with Care: An Unusual Butterfly Journey. Millbrook Press. 2018-01-01. ISBN 9781541528567.
- Burns, Loree Griffin (2014). Beetle busters : a rogue insect and the people who track it. Houghton Mifflin Harcourt. ISBN 9780547792675. OCLC 870529726.
- Burns, Loree Griffin (2017). Life on Surtsey : Iceland's upstart island. Houghton Mifflin Harcourt. ISBN 9780544687233. OCLC 960969133.
