= Terry Burns =

Terry Burns may refer to:

- Terence Burns, Baron Burns (born 1944), British economist
- Terry Burns (1937–1985), brother of David Bowie

== See also ==
- Teri Byrne (born 1972), American former fitness competitor
