= Greg Burns =

Greg Burns may refer to:

- Greg Burns (American football) (born 1972), American football coach
- Greg Burns (Australian rules footballer) (born 1958), former Australian rules footballer
- Greg Burns (musician), American musician with Red Sparowes
- Greg Burns (radio personality), British radio personality currently heard on CHFI-FM in Canada
- Greg Burns (rugby league) (born 1995), rugby league footballer

== See also ==
- Greg Byrnes (born 1987), Australian rugby player
