= Marilyn Burns (disambiguation) =

Marilyn Burns may refer to:

- Marilyn Burns (1949–2014), American actress
- Marilyn Burns (mathematics educator) (born 1941), American mathematics educator and children's mathematics book author
- Marilyn Burns (politician) (born c. 1956), Canadian politician and leader of the Alberta Advantage Party
