= Andrew Burns =

Andrew Burns may refer to:

- Andrew Burns (Royal Navy officer) (born 1969)
- Andrew Burns, Northern Irish member of the Real IRA, murdered by Óglaigh na hÉireann
- Andrew J. Burns Jr. (1927–2010), member of the Maryland House of Delegates
- Andy Burns (born 1990), American baseball infielder
- Andrew Burns (1991/92–2024), Scottish sex offender later known as Tiffany Scott
