= Keith Burns =

Keith Burns may refer to:

== Sportspeople ==
- Keith Burns (American football coach) (born 1960), American college football coach
- Keith Burns (Australian footballer) (born 1939), former Australian rules footballer
- Keith Burns (linebacker) (born 1972), former professional American football player and coach

== Others ==
- Keith Burns (comics), British comics artist who has worked for the small press and on The Boys
- Keith Burns, American guitarist with Trick Pony
- Keith Burns, Scottish multi-instrumentalist with Political Asylum and others
