= Emile Burns =

British communist and author

- Born: Bernard Emile Vivian Burns; 16 April 1889; Basseterre, St. Kitts, United Kingdom
- Died: 29 November 1972 (aged 83); London, England
- Occupations: Economist, translator, journalist
- Political party: Communist Party of Great Britain
- Spouse: Elinor Burns

Bernard Emile Vivian Burns (16 April 1889 – 29 November 1972) was a British communist, economist, translator and author as an active member of the Communist Party of Great Britain.

== Early life and family ==
Emile Burns was born in Basseterre, St Kitts, on 29 November 1889, the son of James Patrick Burns, the Treasurer and Harbour Master of St. Kitts and Nevis. He had three brothers, Cecil, Robert and Alan, and one sister, Agnes. As a child, he and other boys would often swim out to the ships that were too big to come into the harbour, black and white boys played and swam together. However, once they reached their teens they were no longer allowed to play together. Burns attended Trinity College, Cambridge to study economics. While there, he met Elinor Enfield, and the two married in Nottinghamshire in 1913. Their first daughter, Susannah, was born 11 September 1914, and Marca was born on 4 January 1916. At this time Emile Burns was working for Cunard, but was also serving on a national committee enquiring into poverty, which had been set up by Eleanor Rathbone, and which published Equal Pay and the Family: A Proposal for the National Endowment of Motherhood. The family moved to London sometime after April 1918 but prior to the end of World War I.

== Politics ==
Emile and Elinor were both members of the Independent Labour Party, Emile joining the Communist Party of Great Britain (CPGB) in 1921, followed by Elinor in 1923. Emile found work as the secretary of the Labour Research Department, except during the UK general strike, when he worked as propaganda secretary of the St Pancras Trades Council.

Emile was a supporter of the London busmen's rank and file movement in the 1930s, and edited its newspaper, The Busmen's Punch. In 1935, he was elected to the CPGB's executive, ultimately serving for more than twenty years. He held many positions within the party, most focusing on cultural or educational activity, including a spell as head of the party's propaganda department. He spent a period as editor of the Communist Review, and was later editor of the World News. In the early 1950s, he did much of the preparation work for the party's new programme, the British Road to Socialism.

Burns translated both political and non-political writings from Russian, French and German into English, including Friedrich Engels's Anti-Dühring, and parts of Karl Marx's Theories of Surplus Value. He wrote works of his own including Handbook of Marxism, What is Marxism and Introduction to Marxism, successive basic explanations of Marxism.

== Books and pamphlets ==
Finance; an introductory course for classes and study circles 1922
Imperialism: an outline course for students classes and study circles 1927
Agriculture by H. B. Pointing and E. Burns 1927
Russia's Productive System 1930
The 2 classes in 1931
The only way out 1932
Capitalism, communism, and the transition 1933
What Is The Communist Party? 1933
The Roosevelt Illusion by Burns, Emile & Roy, F M 1934
Karl Liebknecht 1934
A Handbook of Marxism 1935
Abyssinia and Italy 1935
Spain 1936
The People's Front 1936
Difficulties Facing Peace 1936
Money ~ The New People's Library Volume I 1937
Communist Affiliation Pamphlet – 1937
What Is Marxism? 1 Jan 1939
Party Organiser (CPGB) November 1939 (pamphlet)
Mr. Keynes Answered : an Examination of the Keynes Plan 1940
The Soviet Union and Finland (pamphlet) 1940
Labour's Way Forward 1942
Jobs, Homes, Security: Post-war Britain and the Way to Socialism (pamphlet) 1944
The Case for Affiliation: The Labour Party and the Communist Party 1943
The Fight for Labours Programme 1946
The Soviet Transition from Socialism to Communism 1950
The Meaning of Socialism 1950
Introduction to Marxism Dec 1961
Right-wing Labour: Its theory and Practice 1961
Communism: Your Questions Answered 1963
President Nkrumah on Neo-Colonialism 1966 (pamphlet)
Money and Inflation 1968
Winning the peace
The Triumph of Communism: Communist Manifesto Centenary Speech
The World of to-Day: Modern Finance
The Marxist Reader: The Most Significant and Enduring Works of Marxism
