= Raymond Burns =

Raymond Burns may refer to:

- Raymond Burns (golfer) (born 1973), professional golfer from Northern Ireland
- Raymond Burns (illustrator) who illustrated Mel Lyle's Power Boys series
- Captain Sensible (born 1954), English rock musician, real name Raymond Burns
