= Elinor Burns =

British communist, co-operative activist and suffragist

- Born: Margaret Elinor Enfield; 17 May 1887; Loughborough, Leicestershire, England
- Died: 2 November 1978 (aged 91)
- Education: Newnham College, Cambridge
- Political party: Communist Party of Great Britain
- Movement: Co-operative; communist; suffrage
- Spouse: Emile Burns (m. 1913; died 1972)
- Children: 2
- Relatives: Honora Enfield (sister)

Margaret Elinor Burns (née Enfield; 17 May 1887 – 2 November 1978) was a British communist, co-operative activist and suffragist.

== Life and career ==
Born in Loughborough, she was the sister of Honora Enfield. She attended Newnham College, Cambridge, and there joined the Fabian Society. While there, she met fellow student Emile Burns, and the two married on 8 November 1913. They had two children, Susannah and Marca. The family moved to London around the end of World War I, where Elinor and Emile joined the Independent Labour Party. Elinor also joined the Edmonton Co-operative Society and the Women's Co-operative Guild. In 1920, the Edmonton Co-operative became part of the new London Co-operative Society (LCS), of which she was a founder member.

In 1923, Elinor joined the Communist Party of Great Britain (CPGB), along with Emile. Starting in 1926, she wrote the Colonial Series of books for the Labour Research Department, about British imperialism.

Burns focused much of her time on the LCS, and during World War II represented it on bodies such as the Food Control Tribunal and the Insurance Tribunal. In 1943, she was elected to the national executive of the CPGB. She retained her seat on the board of the LCS when other Communists were removed from the organisation's panel of speakers in 1949. She argued that the co-operative movement should expand its influence through vertical integration, co-operative shops selling products of co-operative farms and factories. She also argued that, in order to achieve emancipation, women should involve themselves in the co-operative movement and also join the CPGB.

From 1945, the Daily Worker, associated with the CPGB, was published by the People's Press Printing Society. Burns was a founding member of its management committee, and twice served as its vice-chair. In 1956, although Burns again stood for the executive of the CPGB, she was not put on the party's approved list, and was one of two sitting members to lose their seats.

== Writing ==
- "Franchise Reform. The Speaker's Conference and Women", in The Newcastle Journal, 11 November 1916
- "Equal Terms for Votes. Women and Their Rights as Citizens", in The Newcastle Journal, 1 March 1917
- "Franchise Reform", in The Oxfordshire Weekly News, 11 April 1917
- "Women in Commerce: Interview with Lady Mackworth", in Common Cause, 13 April 1917
- "Education" in The Making of Women (1917), (Oxford Essays in Feminism, Allen and Unwin), ed Victor Gollancz
- Equal Pay and the Family (1918), with K. D. Courtney, H. N. Brailsford, Eleanor Rathbone, Maude Royden, Mary Stocks and Emile Burns
- British Imperialism in China (1926)
- British Imperialism in Malaya (1926)
- British Imperialism in West Africa (1927)
- British Imperialism in Egypt (1928)
- British Imperialism in Ireland (1931)
- Class Issues in the Irish Free State (1933)
- The Co-operatives in the Peace Front (1950)
- The Co-ops and the Crisis (1952)
- A Call to Co-operators (1954)
