= Arthur Burns (disambiguation) =

Arthur F. Burns (1904–1987) was an American economist, former Federal Reserve Chairman

Arthur Burns may also refer to:

- Arthur Burns (historian) (1963–2023), British historian
- Arthur Burns (police officer) (1917–2008), British Chief Constable of Suffolk
- Arthur John Burns (1830–1901), Scottish-born New Zealand politician and woollen mill owner
- Art Burns (born 1954), American discus thrower
