= Tosher Burns =

Irish footballer (1902–1984)

Personal information
- Full name: William Burns
- Date of birth: 29 December 1902
- Place of birth: Newtownards, Irish
- Date of death: September 1984 (aged 81)
- Place of death: Newtownards, Northern Ireland

Youth career
- Nortonville
- Ulster

Senior career*
Years	Team	Apps	(Gls)
1921–1922	Ards		
1922–1925	Glentoran	109	(13)
1925–1926	Wolverhampton Wanderers	1	(0)
1926–1927	Shelbourne	8	(0)
1927	Philadelphia Celtic	4	(2)
1927–1928	J & P Coats	4	(0)
1928	Shelbourne	8	(0)
1928	Wolverhampton Wanderers	3	(0)
1928–1929	Ards		(5)
1929	Workington		
1929–1931	Ards		(12)
1931–1932	Glentoran	29	(6)
1932–1933	Ards United		
1933–1935	Ards		(22)
1935–1936	Belfast St. Peters		

International career
1924	Ireland	1	(0)
- * Club domestic league appearances and goals

William "Tosher" Burns (29 December 1902 – September 1984) was an Irish international footballer who played professionally in Ireland, England and the United States as a centre back.

== Career ==
Born in Newtownards, Burns began his career in his native Ireland with the youth teams of Nortonville and Ulster. He began his senior career in November 1921 with Ards, and later played for Glentoran, Wolverhampton Wanderers, Shelbourne, Philadelphia Celtic, J & P Coats, Workington, Ards United and Belfast St. Peters.

Burns also earned one international cap for Ireland in 1924.
