= Elizabeth Burns =

Elizabeth Burns may refer to:

- Elizabeth Burns (philosopher), British philosopher
- Elizabeth Burns (poet) (1957–2015), English poet
- Elizabeth 'Betty' Burns (1791–1873), Scottish social figure
