= Albert M. Burns =

American politician (1847–1903)

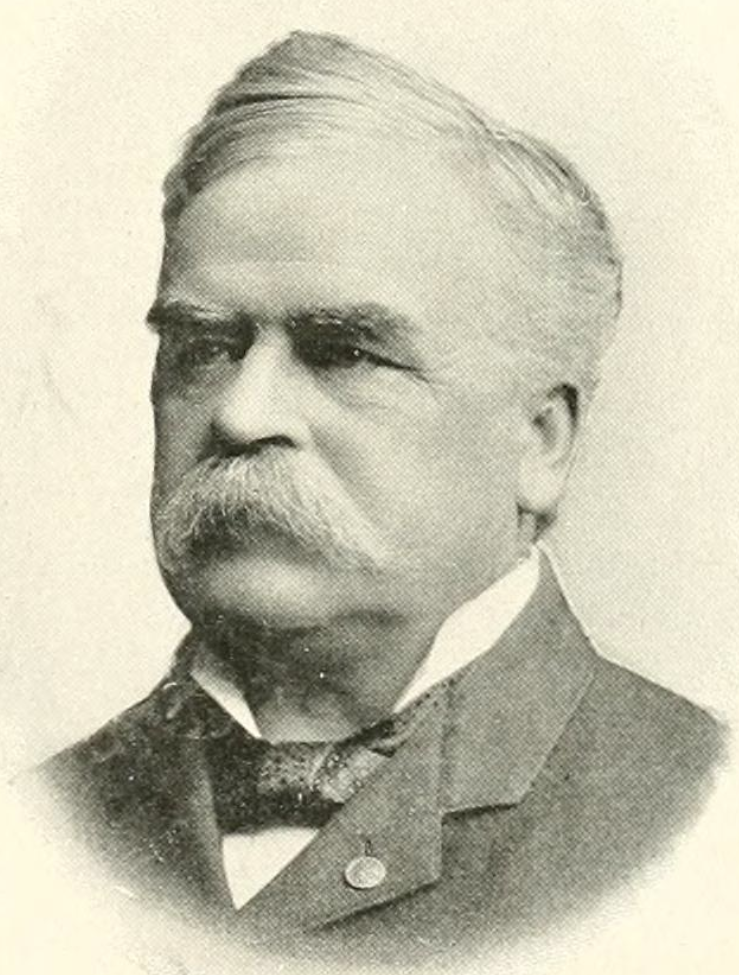
- Burns in 1901 publication

Member of the Indiana Senate
- In office 1899–1903

Personal details
- Born: Albert Minis Burns; November 24, 1847 Clarion, Pennsylvania, U.S.
- Died: February 14, 1903 (aged 55) Indianapolis, Indiana, U.S.
- Resting place: Riverview Cemetery; South Bend, Indiana, U.S.
- Party: Republican
- Spouse: Bessie L. Whitaker (m. 1870)
- Education: Wisconsin Normal School
- Occupation: Politician; soldier
- Military career
- Allegiance: United States
- Branch: Union Army
- Rank: Captain
- Units: 10th Wisconsin; 44th Wisconsin
- Conflicts: American Civil War; Huntsville Raid (Battle of Shiloh); Battle of Perryville; Battle of Stones River; Second Battle of Chattanooga; Battle of Chickamauga (WIA); Atlanta campaign

Albert Minis Burns (November 24, 1847 – February 14, 1903) was a politician from Indiana. He served in the Union Army during the Civil War. He served in the Indiana Senate from 1899 to his death in 1903.

== Early life and education ==
Albert Minis Burns was born on November 24, 1847, in Clarion, Pennsylvania, to Catherine (née Deary) and Thomas Burns. At the age of six, Burns moved to Platteville, Wisconsin, with his family. He attended public schools until the outbreak of the American Civil War.

After serving in the Civil War, Burns attended the Wisconsin Normal School and graduated with high honors in 1866.

== Career ==
=== Military career ===
At the age of thirteen, Burns served as a drummer boy in Company I of the 10th Wisconsin Infantry Regiment. He served under O. M. Mitchell in Kentucky, Tennessee and Alabama. During the Battle of Shiloh, Burns participated in the Huntsville Raid, which blocked reinforcements to the battle. He guarded the bridges along the Marietta and Cincinnati Railroad. In 1862, his regiment was assigned to the Fourteen Army Corps. He followed General Bragg in the Kentucky raids, and participated in the Battle of Perryville. He then fought in the Battle of Stones River, Second Battle of Chattanooga and Battle of Chickamauga. On September 20, 1863, at the Battle of Chickamauga, Burns was wounded in battle and recovered in the hospital for four weeks. He then participated in the Atlanta campaign. After reaching Atlanta, Burns's regiment service expired and he was discharged. He returned to Platteville for three months. For heroic actions in 1863, Burns was commissioned a first lieutenant.

Burns reenlisted in Company K of the 44th Wisconsin Infantry Regiment and was ordered to Nashville. He continued service in Tennessee and Kentucky. He served until the close of the war. Governor James T. Lewis promoted Burns to Captain because "he was the youngest soldier with the longest service from the state".

=== Business career ===
Following his graduation, Burns learned the carriage and ornamental painters' trade. Burns moved to Beaver Dam, Wisconsin. In 1881, Burns moved to South Bend, Indiana, and worked for the Studebaker Bros. Manufacturing Company. He worked there for seven years. He then went into business with himself for two years.

In 1890, Burns became a clerk at the Sandage Steel Skein Company. He was promoted to general superintendent.

Burns served as treasurer of the Central Labor Union for four years. Burns was a member of the Grand Army of the Republic and served as adjutant general for Indiana.

=== Political career ===
Burns was a Republican. In 1894, Burns was an unsuccessful candidate for state senator. In 1898, Burns was elected to the Indiana Senate. In 1902, Burns was re-elected. He served until his death.

== Personal life ==
Burns married Bessie L. Whitaker of Beaver Dam on March 30, 1870. They had four children. Burns lived at 131 East Paris Street in South Bend.

Burns died on February 14, 1903, at English's Hotel in Indianapolis, Indiana. He was buried at Riverview Cemetery in South Bend.
