= Eugene Burns =

American journalist and writer

- Born: January 28, 1906; Moscow, Russia
- Died: July 15, 1958 (aged 52); Baghdad, Iraq
- Occupations: American author, war correspondent, and former Associated Press reporter
- Years active: 1930s–1960s
- Employer: Associated Press
- Known for: Reporting in the Soviet Union, China, and the Pacific during World War II
- Spouse: Olga Jackson
- Children: Carol Eugenia and Stephanie Olga

Eugene Burns was an American author and war correspondent (b. Eugene Burnstein in Estonia). He died on July 15, 1958, at the age of 52, during a street mob revolt in Baghdad, Iraq.

== Personal ==
Burns was born in Moscow, Russia, in 1906 to American missionary parents. He pursued his education at the University of Washington, later earning a master's degree from Harvard, and continuing his studies at the Ludwig-Maximilians-Universität München. His academic career led him to teaching positions in English at Albany College in Oregon and the University of Idaho.

He was married to Olga Jackson, sister of Glenn L. Jackson. The couple met in the early 1940s while both were professors at Albany College. After their wedding, they honeymooned in Hawaii and remained there for eight years. They shared a love for travel, leading tours to the mid- and far-East. Together, they had twin daughters, Carol Eugenia Burns and Stephanie Olga Burns, born in 1944. Later, they resided in Sausalito, California.

== Career ==
Burns began his career as a newsman and later worked as a correspondent for the Associated Press in the Soviet Union, China, and the Pacific during World War II. After sending the first report on the Pearl Harbor attack in 1941, he represented the AP with the fleet in the Pacific. He was present at 17 major engagements, including the Guadalcanal campaign. Drawing from these experiences he wrote Then There Was One, a story about the USS Enterprise (CV-6) and the first year of war in the Pacific.

Beyond journalism, Burns authored books on animals and fishing. He wrote the wildlife column Is That So and held various outdoor-related roles, including forest ranger in Washington, timber cruiser in New Hampshire, and naturalist-lecturer at Yellowstone Park. His best-known book, Advanced Fly Fishing, explores dry fly fishing in America. He also wrote Fresh and Salt Water Spinning and provided content for An Angler's Anthology.

Later in life, Burns transitioned from writing and wildlife journalism to organizing the Holy Land Foundation, aiming to promote tourism, combat Communism in the Middle East, and foster friendship between the United States and Arab countries.

== Death ==
Burns was killed on July 14, 1958, during revolutionary riots in Baghdad, Iraq. He had originally planned to leave the city on July 11, three days before the uprising. However, in a letter to his wife, he explained that he had met friends from Jordan and decided to stay for the weekend to discuss his plans for restoring Biblical shrines throughout the Middle East.

Burns and Sausalito botanist Jose Carabia shared a room in the newly opened New Baghdad Hotel. After breakfast, both were in their room when rebel soldiers entered the lobby. Carabia recalls that Burns, driven by his journalistic instincts, left the safety of their hotel room to report on Iraq's violent revolution. Burns, along with George S. Colley Jr., a San Francisco construction engineer for Pacific Bechtel Corp., and other Westerners, were forced into a truck by rebel soldiers to be escorted under guard to a police station.

As the truck traveled through the city, it either stalled or was deliberately stopped. A mob of over 50 people surrounded them, resulting in the deaths of three Americans—Burns, Colley, and Robert Alcock, an Altadena chief engineer—who were beaten and stabbed to death. Their bodies were never recovered but were believed to have been buried in a common grave alongside other victims of the violence. The coup, known as the 14 July Revolution, led to the overthrow of King Faisal II and the establishment of the Republic of Iraq.

== Bibliography ==
- Advanced Fly Fishing: Modern Concepts With Dry Fly, Streamer, Nymph, Wet Fly, And The Spinning Bubble (Stackpole, 1953)
- The Last King of Paradise (Pellegrini and Cudahy, 1952)
- Then There Was One: The U.S.S. Enterprise and the first year of war (1944)
