= Joseph Burns =

Joseph Burns may refer to:

- Joseph Burns (baseball) (1889–1987), MLB outfielder for the Detroit Tigers
- Joseph Burns (murderer) (c. 1806–1848), New Zealand murderer
- Joseph Burns (Northern Ireland politician) (born 1906, date of death unknown), Ulster Unionist politician, represented North Londonderry, 1958–1972
- Joseph Burns (American politician) (1800–1875), U.S. Representative from Ohio
- Joseph A. Burns (1941–2025), astronomy professor
- Joseph F. Burns (1892–1975), member of the California legislature
- Joe Burns (American football) (born 1979), NFL running back for the Buffalo Bills
- Joe Burns (catcher) (1900–1986), MLB catcher for the Chicago White Sox
- Joe Burns (cricketer) (born 1989), Australian cricketer
- Joe Burns (infielder) (1916–1974), MLB infielder for the Philadelphia Athletics

== See also ==
- Joseph Burn (1871–1950), actuary
- Joseph Byrne (disambiguation)
