= Frank Byrne =

Frank or Frankie Byrne may refer to:

- Frank M. Byrne (1858–1927), American politician
- Frank Byrne (Irish nationalist) (1848–1894), an instigator of the Irish National Invincibles
- Frank Byrne (Australian politician) (c. 1836–1923), NSW politician
- Frank Byrne (rugby union), (born 1938), Irish rugby union player
- Frankie Byrne (Gaelic footballer) (1924–2019), played for Meath GAA
- Frankie Byrne (EastEnders), fictional character
- Frankie Byrne (broadcaster) (1922–1993), public relations consultant and broadcaster

== See also ==
- Francis Byrne (disambiguation)
