= Albert Garrette Burns =

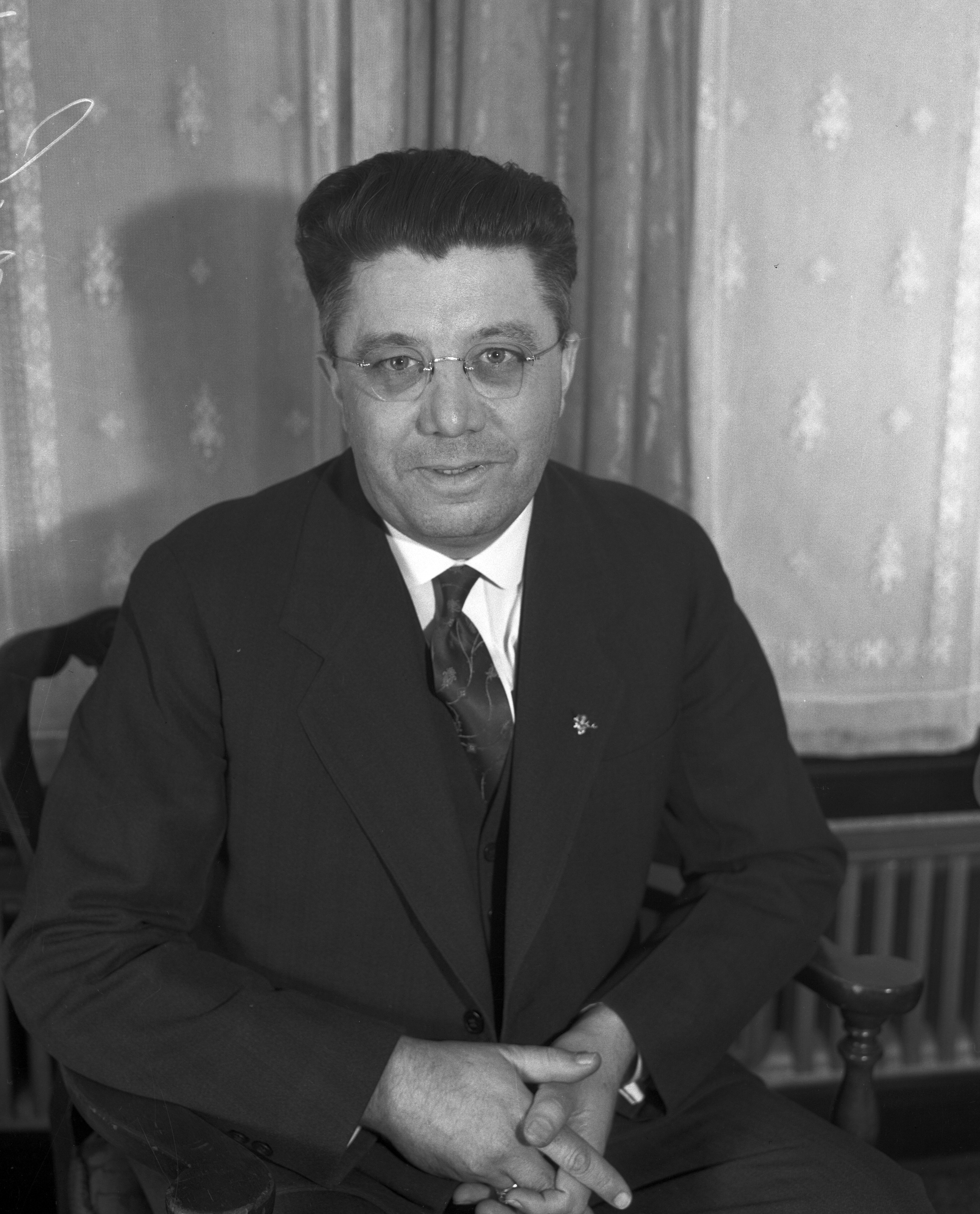
Burns in 1936

Albert Garrette Burns (March 10, 1888 – December 4, 1951) was president of the National Inventors Congress starting in 1931 and served until at least 1939. He was known as the "Nation's Gadget Chief".

== Biography ==
He was born in California on March 10, 1888, to William F. Burns and Louise C. Ball. He later invented a lock for Model T Fords. Other jobs included working in a tea and coffee store, directing a local chamber of commerce, running a wholesale business, as well as managing a sanitarium and a textile mill. He also invented and marketed a bread-slicer.
