= Otto L. Burns =

American politician

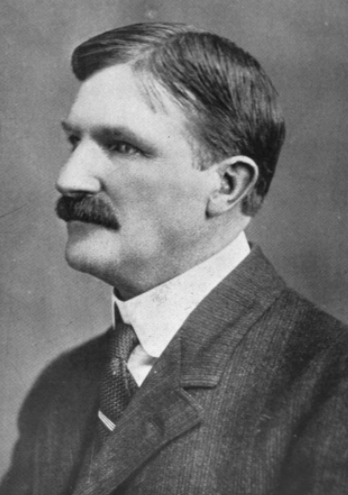

Member of the Wyoming House of Representatives
- In office 1913–1915

Personal details
- Born: September 11, 1868 Des Moines, Iowa, U.S.
- Died: December 13, 1941 (aged 73) Laramie, Wyoming, U.S.
- Resting place: Greenhill Cemetery, Laramie, Wyoming, U.S.
- Party: Democratic
- Spouse: Adelaide B. Burns
- Parents: L. D. Burns (father); Minerva Adams (mother)

Otto L. Burns (September 11, 1868 – December 13, 1941) was an American politician who served as a member of the Wyoming House of Representatives as a Democrat.

== Life ==
Otto L. Burns was born in Des Moines, Iowa on September 11, 1868, to L. D. Burns and Minerva Adams and was educated in public schools. On July 13, 1886, he moved to the Wyoming Territory where he became a rancher and stock raiser. From 1913 to 1915 he served in the Wyoming House of Representatives from one of Albany county's three seats.

On December 13, 1941, he was driving home to Laramie, Wyoming, when he was hit by a freight train seven miles north of Laramie and was killed at age 72.
