= Darin Burns =

Canadian football defensive lineman

Profile
- Position: Defensive lineman

Personal information
- Born: Montreal, Quebec

Career history
- 1979–1980: Etobicoke Argonauts
- 1984: Hamilton Hurricanes
- 1985–1986: Burlington Braves
- 1985–1986: Hamilton Tiger-Cats
- 1986–1987: Montreal Alouettes
- 1988: Ottawa Rough Riders
- 1989–1990: Ottawa Bootleggers
- 2009–2010: Moncton Mustangs tier 5
- 2021–Present: Moncton Mustangs tier 5

Darin Burns is a Canadian former professional football defensive lineman.

== Playing career ==
Burns began his career playing junior football for the Etobicoke Argonauts, Hamilton Hurricanes, and Burlington Braves (Hamilton Tiger-Cats' Junior affiliate team).

His stint with the Burlington Braves was particularly successful, producing a team captaincy, two All-Star appearances, and two Junior Shenley Awards for most outstanding player. As of 2010 Burns held franchise records for most career sacks, season sacks, and sacks in a single game. While playing for Burlington, Burns signed with the Hamilton Tiger-Cats and attended training camps from 1985–1986. In 1986 he was traded to the Montreal Alouettes and attended training camp. Later in Spring of 1987 he became the first non-university player to be invited to the CFL Combine. The Montreal Alouettes organization folded in June 1987 soon after Burns was signed, which resulted in Burns later being signed by the Ottawa Rough Riders in 1988.

Burns later played for the Hamilton Jaguars from 2023 to 2024, and in 2025, he joined the Ontario Power 5 Football League, where he was named captain of the Burlington Longhorns. Burns became the first person in Canadian history to play organized football in six different decades, and finished his final game with the Burlington Longhorns in 2025.

== Personal life ==
Burns played an extra on ten episodes of Quebec television series Lobby.
