= Travis Burns =

Travis Burns may refer to:

- Travis Burns (actor) (born 1991), Australian actor in Neighbours
- Travis Burns (rugby league) (born 1984), Australian NRL player
