= Brendon Burns =

Brendon or Brendan Burns may refer to:

- Brendon Burns (comedian) (born 1971), Australian comedian
- Brendon Burns (politician), New Zealand politician
- Brendan A. Burns (1895–1989), United States Army general
