= Francis Burns =

Francis Burns may refer to:

- Francis Burns (footballer) (born 1948), Scottish former footballer
- Francis Burns (minister) (1809–1863), American Methodist minister and missionary
- Francis Putnam Burns (1807–?), piano maker in Albany, New York
- Francis Wallace Burns (1789–1803), second son of the poet Robert Burns
- Larry Gelbart (1928–2009), American writer who used the pseudonym Francis Burns

== See also ==
- Frank Burns (disambiguation)
- Francis Byrne (disambiguation)
