= Thea Burns =

Art researcher and conservator

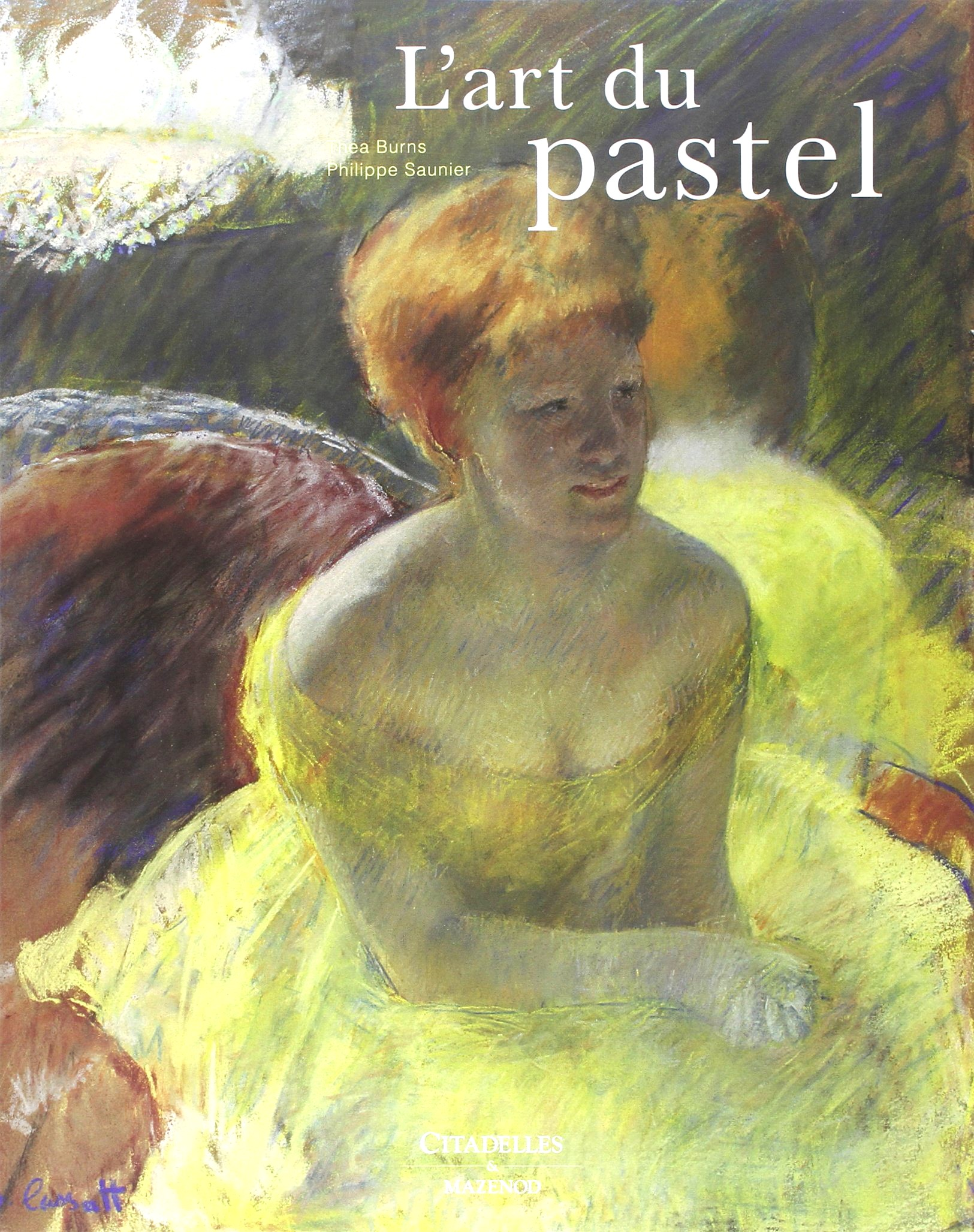
The cover of L'art du pastel, 2014, showing Mary Cassatt's Lydia Leaning on Her Arms (in a theatre box). Pastel, 1879.

Dorothea ("Thea") Burns is an independent art researcher and former chief conservator of works on paper at the Weissman Preservation Center of Harvard University. She is an expert on pastel art and metalpoint drawing.

== Education ==
Burns earned a BA in fine arts from McGill University in 1966 and an MA in art conservation from Queen's University in 1978. She earned her PhD at the Courtauld Institute of Art, University of London. She earned a certificate in the conservation of works of art on paper from the Center for Conservation and Technical Studies at the Fogg Art Museum, Harvard.

== Career ==
Burns joined Queen's University in 1989 where she directed the paper objects component of the master's degree program in art conservation and was a tenured associate professor of paper objects conservation.

In January 2002, Burns was appointed the first Helen H. Glaser Conservator at the Weissman Preservation Center of Harvard University in which capacity she was the senior paper conservator at the Harvard College Library.

Her first book, The invention of pastel painting (2007) was described by reviewer Rosie Freemantle in Journal of the Institute of Conservation as an exceptional work that "covers the topic with an amount of detail unseen in previous works on the subject".

With Philippe Saunier, she is the author of L'art du pastel (2014) which was translated into English and published by Abbeville Press in 2015 as The art of the pastel. The book was described by the publishers as "The only comprehensive history of pastel art".

== Selected publications ==
=== English ===
- The invention of pastel painting. Archetype Publications, London, 2007. ISBN 978-1904982128
- The luminous trace: Drawing and writing in metalpoint. Archetype Publications, London, 2012. ISBN 978-1904982838
- The art of the pastel. Abbeville Press, 2015. (With Philippe Saunier) (Translated by Elizabeth Heard) ISBN 978-0789212405

=== French ===
- L'art du pastel. Citadelles et Mazenod, 2014. (With Thea Burns) ISBN 978-2850886003
