= Alexander Burns (minister) =

Minister and educator

Alexander Burns (12 August 1834 – 22 May 1900) was born in Northern Ireland and became a minister and educator in Canada.
