= Mark Burns (photographer) =

American photographer

Mark Burns (born 1958) is an American professional landscape photographer. He specializes in black and white fine art photography. His work has appeared in national sporting and wine magazines, as well as TIME. A retrospective collection of work was exhibited at the George Bush Presidential Library and Museum from 2009 to 2010.

== Career ==
His professional career began in 1978 as a sports photographer in Houston, Texas. In the 1980s, he work began to shift toward commercial photography. His work has appeared in numerous national magazines including The Sporting News, TIME, Wine Spectator, Wine Enthusiast, and Wine & Spirits.

From 2009 to 2010, a retrospective collection of his work was exhibited for 10 months at the George Bush Presidential Library and Museum in College Station, Texas.

After Burns completed an exhibition for the Bush library titled 'The Culture of Wine,' Jean Becker, Bush's chief of staff, approached him and asked if he was interested in completing another project for the Bush Library. The National Parks Photography Project grew from that conversation.

The mission of this project was to "celebrate and pay tribute to the important role that the visual image has played in the history and creation of our national parks." The exhibit opening was planned for 2016—the 100th anniversary of the act creating the National Park Service.

By 2015, Burns had photographed all 59 of the National Parks (The Gateway Arch in St. Louis was not designated as a National Park until 2018, and it was not included in the project). He photographed the parks in black and white to evoke the time period in which the National Park Service was created and to honor early photographers of the parks.

In collaboration with Adler Fels and the National Park Foundation, Mark Burns participated in the National Parks Wine Collection. A percentage of the proceeds from the wine purchased was donated to the foundation "to support its mission to preserve and enrich America’s national parks." Burns's iconic national park images are featured on the label of each wine bottle.

The exhibit debuted at the George H.W. Bush Presidential Library in College Station. Exhibits followed at Sam Houston Memorial Museum, The Pearl Fincher Museum, the Houston Museum of Natural Science, the LBJ Presidential Library, and the George W. Bush Presidential Library.

President George H. W. Bush called Burns a "modern-day Ansel Adams."

== Recent exhibitions ==
- September 28, 2009 – August 22, 2010: 'Mark Burns - A Retrospective' at the George H.W. Bush Presidential Library and Museum, College Station, Texas.
- 2009–2010: The Culture of Wine exhibit
- 2011–present: The National Parks Photography Project
  - October 1, 2016 – January 11, 2017, at the LBJ Presidential Library and Museum, Austin, Texas.
  - August 10, 2016 – August 30, 2016, at the George W. Bush Presidential Library and Museum, Dallas, Texas.
  - June 17, 2016 – September 7, 2016, at the Houston Museum of Natural Science, Houston, Texas.
  - June 4, 2016 – September 3, 2016, at the Pearl Fincher Museum of Fine Arts, Spring, Texas.
  - March 30, 2016 – May 22, 2016, at the Sam Houston Memorial Museum - Walker Education Center, Huntsville, Texas.
  - November 30, 2015 – March 21, 2016, at the George H. W. Bush Presidential Library and Museum, College Station, Texas.
- 2018–present: Grand Canyon Photographs
  - March 1, 2019 - June 9, 2019 at the George H. W. Bush Presidential Library and Museum, College Station, Texas.
  - June 11, 2019 – September 22, 2019, at the Sam Houston Memorial Museum, Huntsville, Texas.
