= Karen Burns =

Karen Burns may refer to:

- Karen Burns (academic) (born 1962), architectural historian and theorist
- Karen Ramey Burns (?–2012), American forensic anthropologist
