= Mel Berns =

American make-up artist

Mel Berns (September 27, 1897 - May 7, 1977) was an American make-up artist. He was the Head of Makeup at RKO Pictures for more than twenty years.

== Career ==
Berns began his career in the entertainment industry while working as an agent at the William Morris Agency. Later he became the Head of Makeup at RKO Pictures for more than twenty years, creating the makeup for Fred Astaire and Ginger Rogers and Katharine Hepburn's screentest. He was a lifelong friend of Ginger Rogers, who makes ample reference to their friendship in her autobiography: Ginger: My Story.

He worked extensively in television after leaving RKO, notably the Perry Mason series. "The crew is giving it the best of Hollywood's techniques," Burr told columnist Erskine Johnson. The crew included veteran make-up artist Berns.

The baseball player Babe Ruth had severe scarring from acne on his face. Mel Berns developed makeup for Ruth so that Ruth could feel more comfortable in public. A picture of Ruth and Berns shows Ruth in a smock and Berns applying makeup to his face. The picture is autographed to Berns by Babe Ruth.

== Film credits ==
- A Bill of Divorcement (1932)
- Morning Glory (1933)
- King Kong (1933)
- Christopher Strong (1933)
- Professional Sweetheart (1933)
- Rafter Romance (1933)
- Little Women (1933)
- Flying Down to Rio (1933)
- The Son of Kong (1933)
- Spitfire (1934)
- The Gay Divorcee (1934)
- Roberta (1935)
- The Nitwits (1935)
- Alice Adams (1935)
- Top Hat (1935)
- Sylvia Scarlett (1935)
- Follow The Fleet (1936)
- Mary of Scotland (1936)
- Swing Time (1936)
- Shall We Dance (1937)
- Stage Door (1937)
- Bringing Up Baby (1938)
- Carefree (1938)
- Bachelor Mother (1939)
- The Hunchback of Notre Dame (1939)
- The Story of Vernon and Irene Castle (1939)
- Kitty Foyle: The Natural History of a Woman (1940)
- Citizen Kane (1941)
- The Magnificent Ambersons (1942)
- Mr. Lucky (1943)
- The Curse of the Cat People (1944)
