= Laura Burns =

Laura Burns may refer to:

- Laura J. Burns, American writer
- Laura Burns (Hollyoaks), fictional villainess from the British soap Hollyoaks
- Laura Burns, played Molly Kelly in the 1991 film The Ballad of the Sad Café
