= Margaret Burns =

Edinburgh prostitute

- Born: c. 1769; Durham, England, Kingdom of Great Britain
- Died: 1792; Roslin, Midlothian, Scotland, Kingdom of Great Britain
- Other name: Matthews
- Occupation: Prostitute

Margaret Burns or Matthews (c. 1769 – 1792) was a prostitute in Edinburgh in the late 1700s.

She gained notoriety for being at the centre of allegations of prostitution and 'disturbance of the peace' in a case brought to the courts in Edinburgh.

== Life ==
Burns was one of three daughters from her father's first marriage; after her father's second marriage Burns moved from Durham to Edinburgh.

Burns arrived in Edinburgh in 1789 when she was approximately 20 years old and took up residence with Sally Sanderson at an address on Rose Street.

Burns was noted as being very beautiful and fashionable; gaining attention at the 'evening promenades'. An engraving by John Kay depicted her wearing the fashion of the time.

She was involved in a number of disturbances reported around her Rose Street address in Edinburgh. William Creech, a bookseller, publisher and local magistrate, then assisted her neighbours in bringing these complaints to the courts. The complaint was "since Whitsunday last, she and a Miss Sally Sanderson, who were persons of bad character, had kept a very irregular and disorderly house, into which they admit and entertain licentious and profligate persons of both sexes to the great annoyance of their neighbours and breach of the public peace...". These disturbances lead to her being brought before the magistrates where she was sentenced to banishment from the city with the charge of being 'drummed through the streets' and 'confinement in the house of corrections for 6 months' if she returned to Edinburgh.

The verdict was over-turned after an appeal to the courts that received a statement from one of the original witnesses claimed to have been induced to give a statement against Burns.

The poet Robert Burns, who was unrelated to Margaret Burns, followed the case closely and wrote the following under an image of her in his published works;

'Cease ye prudes your envious railing

Lovely burns has charms - confess.

True it is she had one failing

Had a woman ever less?'

Burns remained in Edinburgh after the verdict was overturned but eventually moved to Roslin, Midlothian, less than 10 miles from her Rose Street address.

She died shortly after this at the age of 22. Burns was buried in a graveyard in Rosslyn Chapel.
