= Patrick Byrne =

Patrick Byrne may refer to:

== Sports ==
- Patrick Byrne (sledge hockey) (born 1965), American ice sledge hockey player
- Patrick B. Byrne (born 1956), American horse trainer
- Paddy Byrne, Irish Free State football player in the 1930s
- Pat Byrne (footballer) (born 1956), Irish football player and manager

== Music ==
- Patrick Byrne (musician) (1794–1863), Irish traditional musician
- Pat Byrne (singer) (born 1991), winner of the first series of The Voice of Ireland

== Others ==
- John Byrne (playwright) (born 1940), who, as a painter, uses the name Patrick Byrne
- Patrick Anthony Langan-Byrne (1895–1916), Irish British flying ace
- Patrick Byrne (architect) (1783–1864), Irish architect
- Patrick Byrne (Irish politician) (1925–2021)
- Patrick James Byrne (1888–1950), American Catholic missionary and bishop in Korea and Japan
- Patrick M. Byrne (born 1962), American entrepreneur, founder and former CEO of Overstock.com
- Patrick Michael Byrne (anthropologist) (1856–1932), a.k.a. Paddy and Pado, scientist and telegraph master at Charlotte Waters
- Patrick Byrne (fl. 1795–1837), of Clone, Ireland, in the list of monumental masons
- Patrick Byrne (commissioner) (born 1946), Irish Police Commissioner.

== See also ==
- Pat Byrnes, cartoonist
- Patrick Burns (disambiguation)
