= Governor Burns =

Governor Burns may refer to:

- Alan Burns (colonial administrator) (1887–1980), Governor of British Honduras
- John A. Burns (1909–1975), 2nd Governor of Hawaii
- W. Haydon Burns (1912–1987), 35th Governor of Florida

== See also ==
- James F. Byrnes (1882–1972), 104th Governor of South Carolina
