= Patrick Burns =

Patrick Burns may refer to:

- Patrick Burns (businessman) (1856–1937), Canadian rancher, businessman, and senator
- Patrick Burns (paranormal investigator) (born 1968), American
- Patrick J. Burns (c. 1845–1915), mayor of Bathurst, New Brunswick, US
- Pat Burns (1952–2010), Canadian ice hockey coach
- Pat Burns (broadcaster) (1921–1996), Canadian talk show host and reporter

== See also ==
- Paddy Burns
- Pat Byrnes, American cartoonist
- Patrick Byrne (disambiguation)
