= Nellie Marie Burns =

American actor and poet

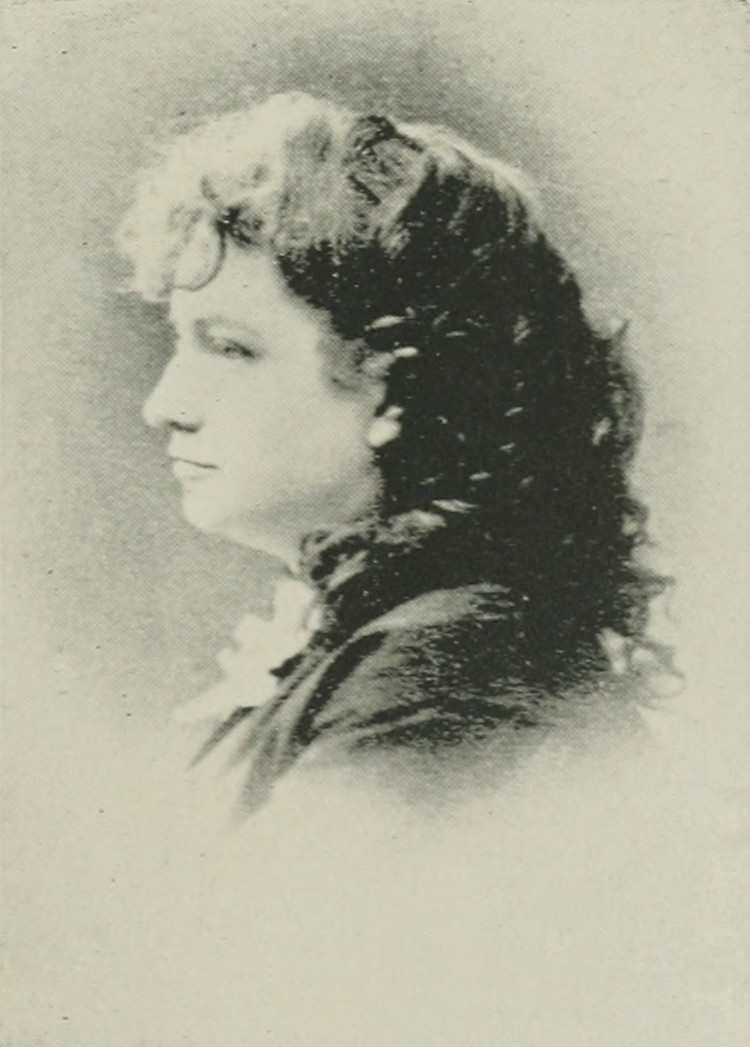
Nellie Marie Burns, "A woman of the century"

Nellie Marie Burns (ca. 1850 – June 16, 1897) was a 19th-century American actor and poet.

== Biography ==
Ellen Marie Sherman was born and educated in Waltham, Massachusetts, about 1850. She was a daughter of Dr. Newell Sherman, of Waltham, a descendant of Rev. John Sherman and Mary Launce, a granddaughter of Thomas Darcy, the Earl Rivers. Rev. Sherman had been a Fellow of Harvard. From him were also descended General William Tecumseh Sherman and Hon. John Sherman of Ohio. The family came to the United States from Dedham, Essex, England, in 1642. Her mother's maiden name was Kimball, and she came from the English Brights and Bonds, of Bury St Edmunds.

By her first marriage, she was the mother of George C. Cooper, editor of the Rochester, New York, Union.

For some years, Nellie was on the stage. It was there that she met the actor and comedian, Thomas N. Burns, whom she married in 1878. At the suggestion of her husband, she left the stage a few years after her marriage.

Burns had been an actress, and she left the stage after marriage, at the suggestion of her husband. They made their summer home in Kittery Point, Maine. She wrote much from 1886 and prepared her manuscript for publication in book form. She was a contributor to The Boston Globe, the Portsmouth Times, the Waltham Tribune, Biddeford Journal, and other journals.

She died June 16, 1897, aged 49–50, at Kittery Point, and was buried at Grove Hill Cemetery in Waltham.
