= Lauri Burns =

American writer and philanthropist

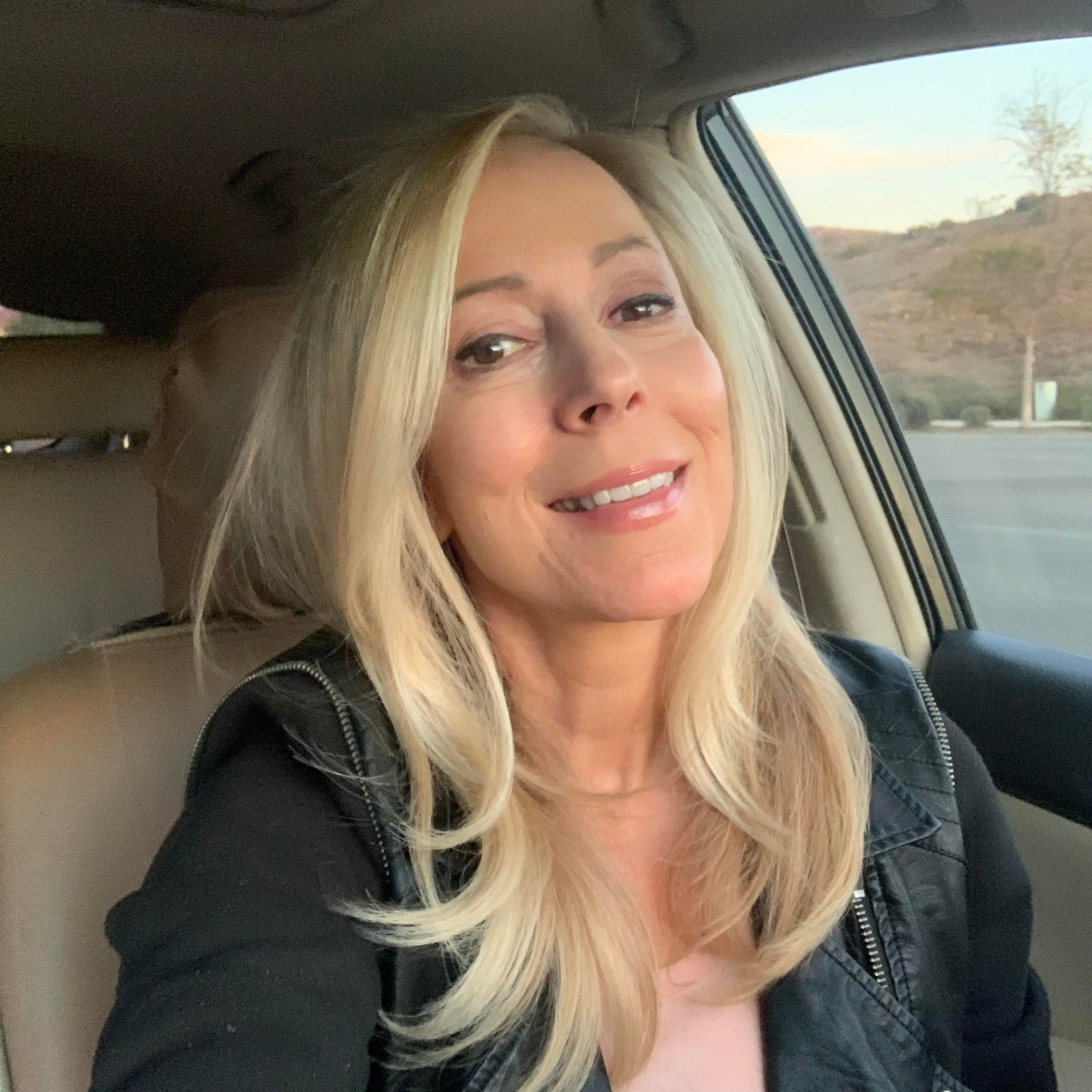
- Born: Lauri Lynne Burns
- Occupation: Writer
- Website: lauriburns.com

Lauri Burns is an American writer and philanthropist. She is the author of the book Punished for Purpose and the founder of The Teen Project.

== Biography ==
Burns was born into a Jewish family and grew up in Long Island, New York. Her father, an airline pilot, physically abused her when she was a child; her mother left and moved to Southern California. Her father covered the abuse by reporting her as suicidal with severe psychiatric issues, placing her in Central Islip Psychiatric Ward. Following her release, Burns lived in 18 different group homes during her adolescent years.

Burns eventually fled to Orange County, California where she began using heroin and cocaine. She became homeless at the age of 18 and worked as a paid call girl and prostitute, and gave birth to her daughter at the age of 19. Her daughter was later placed in foster care with Burns continued working the streets. Burns was arrested for prostitution four times, and lived in 31 different places from the ages of 18 to 23. At the age of 23, Burns was beaten and left for dead on a canyon road. The event led Burns to go to rehab, get sober, enroll in school, and get her daughter back.

Burns regained custody of her daughter, who was five years old at the time. She also enrolled in classes to learn computer network programming. By the time she was 26, she held a supervisory role at Northrop Grumman.

Burns began serving on the local Foster Care Advisory Board in 2006 and has taken in 36 teen foster children. In 2007, Burns started the charity The Teen Project. The charity works with girls out of foster care and victims of sex trafficking by providing drug treatment and life-skills education. In 2010 she released her auto-biography, Punished for Purpose. In 2018, Burns purchased a defunct Boys Town property in Trabuco Canyon, California, which she converted into a residential center for foster girls between 15 and 21 years old.

== Select bibliography ==
- — (2011). Punished For Purpose: From Out of the Darkness Came a Powerful Healing Light (2nd ed.). Savannah Star Publishing Co. ISBN 9780983270607. OCLC 703204611.
