= Owen Burns =

Owen Burns may refer to:

- Owen Burns (cricketer) (1911–1964), South African cricketer
- Owen Burns (developer) (1869–1937), American developer
- Owen McIntosh Burns (1892–1952), American judge
