= Síle Burns =

Irish camogie player

Personal information
- Native name: Síle Ní Bhroin (Irish)
- Born: 1985 (age 40–41) Cork, Ireland

Sport
- Sport: Camogie
- Position: Corner forward
- Position: Corner forward
Club titles
- Cork titles: 1
Inter-county
- Years: County
- 2004-2009: Cork

Síle Burns (born 1985 in Cork) is a camogie player from County Cork, Ireland. She won All Ireland camogie medals in 2008 and 2009 and was a Camogie All Star Award winner in 2008.

Burns is also the holder of All-Ireland Minor, Intermediate and Senior medals as well as Sciath na Scoil honours. She won a Senior county championship medal with divisional side Muskerry in 2007 and captured a Junior championship title with her club Rockban. She scored two late points to earn a draw for Cork in the 2010 All Ireland semi-final.

She is the daughter of former Cork Senior hurler Denis Burns.
