= M. W. Burns =

American sound artist

M. W. Burns (born 1958 in Stamford, Connecticut) is an American sound artist. His audio installations explore how sound can transform one's sense of place. Much of his work has focused on public address and the evolving proliferation of spoken message systems where voices are deployed as behavior management devices, operating as a kind of "disembodied sonic superego". One of his earliest public works took place in 1983 in a Philadelphia park, repeating short phrases over a PA system.

More recent projects integrate prerecorded sounds into existing environments to alter the perception of events. Much like the Foley artist, who uses sound effects in film to create a sense of action or environment, Burns's application of sound to space plays with one's sense of presence and reality.

Burns has had solo exhibitions at the TBA Exhibition Space, Chicago; Northern Illinois University Art Museum; Tough, Chicago and the Lab, San Francisco. His sound installations have been included in numerous group exhibitions, including the "2000 Whitney Biennial" at the Whitney Museum of American Art, New York; "Sound/Video/Film", the Donald Young Gallery; "Contextual: Art and Text in Chicago", at the Chicago Cultural Center; "Time Arts" at the Museum of Contemporary Art, Chicago; "The Body" at the Renaissance Society at the University of Chicago and "Sound Canopy", a public project supported by the Hyde Park Art Center.
