= Francis Byrne =

Francis Byrne may refer to:

- Francis John Byrne (1934–2017), Irish historian
- Francis Byrne (politician) (1877–1938), former member of the Legislative Assembly of Quebec
- Francis Barry Byrne, architect
- Francis Byrne (Australian politician), New South Wales politician
- Francis Byrne (rugby union), English international rugby union player

== See also ==
- Frank Byrne (disambiguation)
- Francis Burns (disambiguation)
