= Senator Burns =

Senator Burns may refer to:

- Barnabas Burns (1817–1883), Ohio State Senate
- Bob Burns (Arizona politician) (born 1938), Arizona State Senate
- Brenda Burns (born 1950), Arizona State Senate
- Bruce Burns (born 1952), Wyoming State Senate
- Charles H. Burns (1835–1909), New Hampshire State Senate
- Conrad Burns (1935–2016), U.S. Senator from Montana
- David Burns, Lord Burns (born 1952), Senator of the College of Justice of Scotland
- David C. Burns (fl. 2000s–2010s), Maine State Senate
- Edward E. Burns (1858–1941), Wisconsin State Senate
- Harold Burns (politician) (1926–2013), New Hampshire State Senate
- J. Frederick Burns (fl. 1930s–1940s), Maine State Senate
- J. Irving Burns (1843–1925), New York State Senate
- John David Burns (born 1936), Oregon State Senate
- Michael Burns (Tennessee politician) (1813–1896), Tennessee State Senate
- Otway Burns (1775–1850), North Carolina State Senate
- Patrick Burns (businessman) (1856–1937), State Senate of Canada
- Robert Burns (Oklahoma politician) (1874–1950), Oklahoma State Senate
- Robert Burns (representative) (1792–1866), New Hampshire State Senate

== See also ==
- Harry T. Burn (1895–1977), Tennessee State Senate
- Senator Byrnes (disambiguation)
