= Harry Burns =

Harry Burns may refer to:

== People ==
- Harry Burns (activist) (1922–2000), US civil rights leader
- Harry Burns (doctor) (born 1951), former Chief Medical Officer for Scotland
- Harry Burns (filmmaker) (1882–1939), silent film director and actor, Hollywood trade magazine editor

== Characters ==
- Harry Burns, a character played by Billy Crystal in the 1989 film When Harry Met Sally...
- Harry Burns, character on Harry's Girls
- Harry Burns, character on Perfect Strangers

== See also ==
- Harold Burns (disambiguation)
- Harry Burns Hutchins (1847–1930), president of the University of Michigan, 1909–1920
- Henry Burns (disambiguation)
- Harry Byrne (disambiguation)
