= Roy Burns =

Roy Burns may refer to:

- Roy Burns (drummer) (1935–2018), American drummer, educator and percussion manufacturer
- Roy Burns (footballer) (1916–1983), English footballer
- For the fictional character, see the list of Friday the 13th characters
