= Henry Burns =

Henry Burns may refer to:

- Henry Lee Burns (born 1947), Louisiana politician
- Henry Burns (doctor), professor of global public health
- Henry D. Burns, mayor of Meridian, Mississippi
- Henry Burns, character in Harry's Girls

== See also ==
- Harry Burns (disambiguation)
- Henry Byrne (disambiguation)
