= Larry Burns =

Larry Burns may refer to:

- Larry Burns (1911–1983), Northern Irish actor, appeared in Count Five and Die
- Larry Burns, Canadian hockey player, played in 1960 Memorial Cup
- Larry Burns (General Motors) (21st century), American executive for General Motors
- Larry Alan Burns (born 1954), U.S. federal judge
- Larry Burns (The Simpsons), fictional character
