= Paul Burns =

Paul Burns may refer to:

- Paul Burns (footballer) (born 1984), Scottish footballer
- Paul Burns (judge), Irish judge
- Paul E. Burns (1881–1967), American actor

== See also ==
- Pauline Powell Burns (1872–1912), American pianist and artist
- Paul Byrne (disambiguation)
