= Kevin Burns (cricketer) =

New Zealand cricketer (1960–2024)

Personal information
- Full name: Kevin James Burns
- Born: 7 July 1960; Invercargill, New Zealand
- Died: 20 May 2024 (aged 63); Queenstown, New Zealand
- Batting: Left-handed
- Bowling: Right-arm medium
- Role: Batsman

Domestic team information
- Years: Team
- 1977/78–1991/92: Southland
- 1980/81–1991/92: Otago

Career statistics
| Competition | First-class | List A |
|---|---|---|
| Matches | 58 | 31 |
| Runs scored | 2,729 | 497 |
| Batting average | 29.03 | 18.40 |
| 100s/50s | 3/16 | 0/3 |
| Top score | 136 | 54* |
| Catches/stumpings | 30/– | 5/– |
- Source: ESPNcricinfo, 24 May 2024

Kevin James Burns (7 July 1960 – 20 May 2024) was a New Zealand cricketer. He played 58 first-class and 31 List A matches, all but one of them for Otago, between the 1980–81 and 1991–92 seasons.

Burns was born at Invercargill in 1960. He played for Southland in a December 1977 Hawke Cup match against Central Otago at Balclutha, and went on to play a total of 28 Hawke Cup matches for the team, with his final appearance in 1992. He captained Southland when they held the Hawke Cup between 1989 and 1992. He played for Otago age-group teams before making his representative debut for the senior Otago team in December 1980 against Wellington at Molyneux Park in Alexandra.

Primarily a batsman, Burns played in a total of 58 first-class matches and scored a total of 2,729 runs at a batting average of 29.03 runs per innings, including three centuries. He set new record partnerships for Otago for the second wicket―putting on 254 runs batting with Ken Rutherford against Wellington in 1987/88―and for the fourth wicket―a partnership of 235 with Richard Hoskin against Northern Districts during the same season. He played one match for a New Zealand XI against the touring England team, opening the batting in a match played between the first and second Test matches of a three match Test series in early 1988, but never played international cricket for New Zealand. He played in 31 List A matches for Otago, scoring 497 runs, and made his final appearance for the provincial team in a January 1992 first-class fixture.

Burns and his wife Lynne had three children. He died of cancer at his home in Queenstown, on 20 May 2024, at the age of 63.
