= Lord Burns =

Lord Burns may refer to either:

- David Burns, Lord Burns, Scottish judge
- Terence Burns, Baron Burns, life peer
