= Harold Burns =

Harold Burns may refer to:

- Harold Burns (politician) (1926–2013), New Hampshire politician
- Harold Burns (cricketer) (1908–1944)

== See also ==
- Harold Birns, former Justice
- Harold Byrns, conductor
- Harry Burns (disambiguation)
