= Jake Burns (rugby union) =

New Zealand rugby union player (born 1941)

- Born: John Francis Burns; 17 February 1941 (age 85) Christchurch, New Zealand
- Height: 1.91 m (6 ft 3 in)
- Weight: 95 kg (209 lb)
- School: St Bede's College

Rugby union career
- Position: Lock
Provincial / State sides
Years	Team	Apps	(Points)
1962–72	Canterbury		
International career
Years	Team	Apps	(Points)
1970	New Zealand	0	(0)

John Francis "Jake" Burns (born 17 February 1941) is a former New Zealand rugby union player. A lock, Burns represented Canterbury at a provincial level. He was a member of the New Zealand national side, the All Blacks, on their 1970 tour of South Africa, playing in nine matches but no internationals.
