= Hugh Burns =

Hugh Burns may refer to:-

- Hugh Burns (footballer, born 1965), Scottish football defender for several clubs, including Rangers and Kilmarnock
- Jock Burns (Hugh Burns, 1894–1963) Scottish football centre-half for several clubs, including Rochdale and Dumbarton
- Hugh Burns (musician), London-based Scottish guitarist
- Hugh M. Burns (1902–1988), American politician in California
