= Jacob Burns =

Jacob Burns may refer to:

- Jacob Burns (attorney) (1902–1993), Russian-born American
- Jacob Burns (soccer) (born 1978), Australian football player

== See also ==
- Jacob Burns Film Center, a cultural arts center in Pleasantville, New York
