= Marge Burns =

American golfer

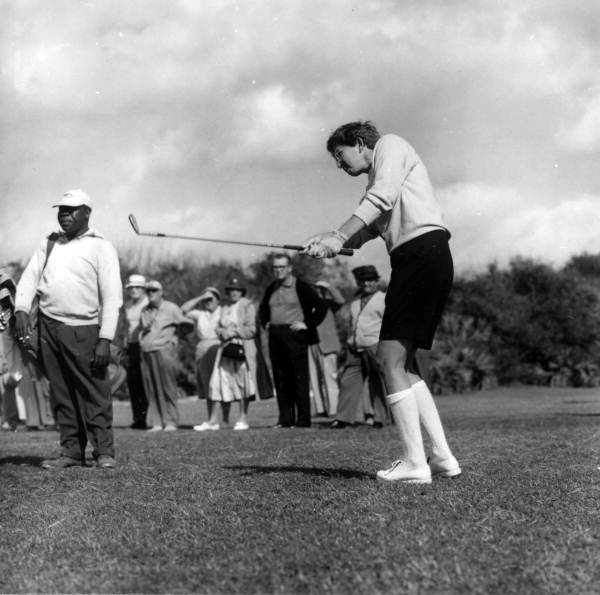

Marjorie "Marge" Burns (July 13, 1925 – June 3, 2009) was an American and former collegiate and professional golfer.

== Career ==
A graduate of Woman's College UNC in 1948, Burns went on to win the North Carolina Amateur Championship an unprecedented ten times and won the Teague Award as the outstanding amateur athlete in the Carolinas five times.
