= Ned Burns =

American politician

Member of the Idaho House of Representatives from the 26A district
- In office December 23, 2021 – November 30, 2024
- Preceded by: Marianna Davis
- Succeeded by: Mike Pohanka

Personal details
- Born: Twin Falls, Idaho, U.S.
- Party: Democratic

Ned Burns is an American businessman and politician who served as a member of the Idaho House of Representatives from the 26th district. He was appointed to the seat on December 23, 2021, succeeding Marianna Davis.

== Early life and education ==
Burns was born and raised in Twin Falls, Idaho. He studied business management at the University of Montana.

== Career ==
Burns began his career in the restaurant industry before becoming a real estate agent in the Wood River Valley region. He has since worked for Coldwell Banker and served as the mayor of Bellevue, Idaho. Burns was appointed to the Idaho House of Representatives by Governor Brad Little in December 2021, succeeding Marianna Davis.
