= Dan Burns =

American lacrosse player

Personal information
- Nationality: American
- Born: Baltimore, MD
- Height: 5 ft 6 in (168 cm)
- Weight: 145 lb (66 kg; 10 st 5 lb)

Sport
- Position: Defensive Midfield
- MLL team Former teams: Chesapeake Bayhawks; Hamilton Nationals
- team: University of Maryland

Dan Burns is a current professional lacrosse player for the Chesapeake Bayhawks of the MLL. Dan joined the University of Maryland lacrosse team as a walk-on and eventually became team captain in 2011. He was the 19th overall selection in the 2011 MLL Collegiate Draft by the Hamilton Nationals. He was traded to the Chesapeake Bayhawks in 2013.
