= Sarah Burns (disambiguation) =

Sarah Burns (born 1981) is an American actress.

Sarah Burns may also refer to:

- Sarah Burns (writer), American author, public speaker, and filmmaker
- Sarah Burns (Splinter Cell), video game character

== See also ==
- Sarah Byrnes, character in the book Staying Fat for Sarah Byrnes
