= Sheryl Burns =

New Zealand netball and basketball player and surf lifesaver

Personal information
- Born: Sheryl George; 3 May 1965 (age 61) New Plymouth, New Zealand
- Occupation: Netball coach
- Height: 1.78 m (5 ft 10 in)

Netball career
- Playing position: WD
Years	National team	Caps
1992–93	New Zealand	8
Medal record
Representing New Zealand
World Games
Silver medal – second place	1993 The Hague	Tournament

Sheryl Burns (née George; born 3 May 1965) is a former representative of New Zealand in international netball, basketball and surf lifesaving events. She now teaches netball and works as a high-performance coach in Queensland, Australia.

== Early life ==
Sheryl Burns (née George) was born on 3 May 1965 in New Plymouth in the Taranaki region on the west coast of the North Island of New Zealand.

== Sporting activities ==
Burns has been actively involved in netball, basketball and surf lifesaving as a competitor, coach and administrator. She was inducted into the Taranaki Sports Hall of Fame in 2014 and the New Zealand Surf Life Saving Hall of Fame in 2016.

=== Surf lifesaving ===
Burns joined the East End Surf Life Saving Club in New Plymouth. Between 1980 and 1991 she won 15 gold medals in individual events at national championships and six gold medals in team events. In international Trans-Tasman and Pan-Pacific competitions, she won six gold medals. She was named Taranaki Sportsperson of the Year in 1987 and captained the Taranaki team for four years.

In 1992 Burns coached the New Zealand Under-21 surf lifesaving team. She was a selector for the New Zealand team in 1993 and 1994. She then became the administrator of Surf Life Saving Wellington and Surf Life Saving New Zealand's sport development manager.

=== Basketball ===
Burns represented New Zealand in basketball from 1985 to 1991 and became team captain. She rejoined the team in 1995. Burns was chosen for the "All-star" team from 1987–91 and was the national basketball league's most valuable player in 1986. New Zealand took part in the 1988 World Olympic Qualifying Tournament but failed to qualify.

=== Netball ===
Because of her involvement in basketball, Burns came late to netball, eventually playing just eight matches for her country. As a Wing defence (WD) she first played for the New Zealand national netball team, the Silver Ferns, in November 1992, against England in London. She was a member of the Silver Ferns at the 1993 World Games, when New Zealand came second.

Burns retired from competitive international netball and, after a brief return to basketball, became a coach. In New Zealand she was the coach of the Wellington Capital Shakers team that competed in the National Bank Cup. Moving to Queensland, she became director of netball and head coach at Somerset College on the Gold Coast. She also coaches Bond University Bull Sharks in the HART Sapphire Series. Burns also runs her own elite netball coaching company.
