= Ted Burns =

Australian rules footballer

Personal information
- Full name: Edward William Burns
- Born: 2 February 1889; Murchison East, Victoria
- Died: 2 July 1972 (aged 83); Burnley, Victoria
- Original team: Shepparton

Playing career^{1}
Years	Club	Games (Goals)
1912	St Kilda	2 (0)
- ^{1} Playing statistics correct to the end of 1912.

Edward William Burns (2 February 1889 – 2 July 1972) was an Australian rules footballer who played with St Kilda in the Victorian Football League (VFL).
