= Benedict Delisle Burns =

British neurophysiologist (1915–2001)

- Born: 1915
- Died: 2001 (aged 85–86)
- Education: Tübingen University; King's College Cambridge
- Occupation: Neurophysiologist
- Father: C. Delisle Burns
- Scientific career
- Workplaces: National Institute for Medical Research (NIMR); McGill University

Benedict Delisle Burns FRS (1915–2001) was a neurophysiologist and a pioneer of operations research and of the statistical analysis of neuronal activity.

He studied at Tübingen University, and King's College Cambridge. He worked at National Institute for Medical Research (NIMR), and McGill University.

He was elected Fellow of the Royal Society in 1968.
