= Alan Burns (rugby league) =

Australian rugby league footballer

Personal information
- Full name: Alan Wayne Burns
- Born: 26 March 1961 (age 65) North Sydney, New South Wales

Playing information
- Position: Second-row, Lock
Club
Years	Team	Pld	T	G	FG	P
1981–84	North Sydney	93	24	0	0	84
1983–84	Wakefield Trinity	9	5	0	0	15
1985–87	Western Suburbs	7	2	0	0	8
	Total	109	31	0	0	107

Alan Wayne Burns (born 26 March 1961), also known by the nickname of "Frank", is an Australian former professional rugby league footballer who played in the 1980s. He played at club level for North Sydney, Wakefield Trinity, and the Western Suburbs club, as a five-eighth, second-row, or lock.

== Background ==
Burns was born in the suburb of North Sydney on the Lower North Shore region of Sydney. His nickname of "Frank" comes from the M*A*S*H character Frank Burns.
