= Nicol Burne =

Scottish controversialist

Nicol Burne (fl. 1574–1598) was a Scottish Roman Catholic controversialist.

== Life ==
Burne told Thomas Smeaton in Paisley that he wished to defend Catholic doctrines before the General Assembly of the Church of Scotland. Smeaton excommunicated him, and Burne was arrested. He was confined in St Andrews Castle, and then taken to the Old Tolbooth, Edinburgh. He remained there from 15 October 1580 to the end of January 1581. He was then exiled.

== Works ==
Burne is known through his Disputation published in 1581 in Paris. In the epistle to the reader, Burne states that he was brought up a Calvinist. The work repeats slurs against John Knox and continental Protestant reformers.
