= Kenneth Berns =

American virologist (1938–2024)

Kenneth Ira Berns (June 14, 1938 – January 26, 2024) was an American virologist who was a distinguished professor emeritus at the department of Molecular Genetics and Microbiology at the University of Florida College of Medicine. He is primarily known for his work on adeno-associated viruses (AAV), and his group was one of the first which showed the specificity of the integration of the AAV genomes into the cellular genome. He was a member of the National Academy of Sciences from 1995-2024.

He was the president of the American Society for Virology (ASV) for the academic year 1988–1989 and the president of the American Society for Microbiology (ASM) for the academic year 1996–1997. He was elected in 2000 a fellow of the American Association for the Advancement of Science.

Berns died on January 26, 2024, at the age of 85.
