= Archibaldo Burns =

Mexican film director and screenwriter

- Born: Archibaldo Burns Luján; 7 April 1914; Mexico City
- Died: 24 January 2011 (aged 96); Mexico City
- Occupations: Director; producer; screenwriter
- Spouse(s): Lucinda Urrusti (1948–1954); Beatrice Trueblood (née Aboltins)
- Parents: Archibaldo Burns (father); Carmen Luján Zuloaga (mother)

Archibaldo Burns Luján (7 April 1914 - 24 January 2011) was a Mexican writer and film director. He was born in Mexico City in 1914. He is the descendant of the Scottish poet Robert Burns.

== Career as film director ==
He was sent to Europe at the age of 12, studying in England and then France. Upon his return to Mexico, he administered the cotton ranches of his family in Torreón, Coahuila. At the same time, he became interested in cinema. His first collaboration was with Alejandro Galindo in Refugiados en Madrid (1938). He also worked with Chano Urueta in La noche de los mayas (1939).

His first solo effort as director was the short film Perfecto luna (1959), based on a story by Elena Garro. This movie was entered at the Cannes Film Festival but had the misfortune of being shown in a defective copy. It was lost in a fire at the former Cineteca Nacional in Mexico City.

Burns made his feature film debut with Juego de mentiras (1967); it was later released commercially under the title La venganza de la criada. Other films such as Juan Pérez Jolote (1973), adapted from a novel by Ricardo Pozas, and the short film Un agujero en la niebla (1967) won awards at international film festivals. He also adapted and directed Oficio de tinieblas (1979), based on a novel by Rosario Castellanos.

Some of his films suffered the censure of censors, such as El reventón (1975).

== As a writer ==
As a writer, Burns has published novels (En presencia de nadie, 1964 and Botafumeiro, 1994) and short stories (Los presentes, 1954 and El Cuerpo y el delito, 1966). He was a student of Seki Sano, the Japanese director who taught in Mexico for many years. As a theatre director, he staged La paloma de Amuy by Jean Anouilh in 1953.
