= Allen Burns =

Australian rules footballer

Personal information
- Full name: Allen Solomon Burns
- Born: 31 August 1870; Steiglitz, Victoria
- Died: 8 November 1925 (aged 55); South Melbourne, Victoria

Playing career^{1}
| Years | Club | Games (Goals) |
| 1897–1898; 1901–1903 | South Melbourne | 40 (23) |
- ^{1} Playing statistics correct to the end of 1903.

Allen Solomon Burns (31 August 1870 – 8 November 1925) was an Australian rules footballer who played for the South Melbourne Football Club in the Victorian Football League (VFL).

Born in the small Victoria town of Steiglitz, Burns often played on the half-forward line, and he was noted for kicking goals from quite acute angles using what today would be known as a checkside or banana kick. He was the leading goalkicker for South Melbourne in 1894.

He was the younger brother of Peter Burns, a legend of the game who played with South Melbourne and Geelong. In a VFA match in 1896 where the brothers were in rival teams, Allen made a significant contribution towards South's victory over Geelong.

Allen Burns died in South Melbourne at the age of 55.
