= Jabez Burns =

British divine

Jabez Burns (18 December 1805 – 31 January 1876) was an English nonconformist divine and Christian philosophical writer. He was one of the first clergymen of any denomination to preach teetotalism from the pulpit.

== Biography ==
Burns was born 18 December 1805, in Oldham, Lancashire, where his father was a chemist. He was educated at a school at Chester, and at the grammar school of Oldham, which he left to engage in commercial pursuits at York and Bradford. For about three years he managed a bookselling business at Keighley. His mother, who died in his early childhood, was a Wesleyan, and named him after Dr. Jabez Bunting.

Burns early in life joined the Methodist New Connexion, and at the age of sixteen delivered his first public address in a Methodist house near York. In 1824 Burns married Jane, the daughter of George Dawson of Keighley. He departed in 1826 for London. Here in the midst of hardship he commenced his career as a religious writer by the compilation of the Christian's Sketch Book (1828), of which a second series, with the same title, was issued in 1835. In 1829 he published Spiritual Cabinet and other editions. Previously to this date he had been baptised by the Rev. Mr. Farrent, the pastor of a general baptist congregation at Suffolk Street Chapel, in the Borough; but he did not sever his relations with the Methodist New Connexion. After a few months spent in mission work on behalf of the general baptists in Edinburgh and Leith in 1829, he was from 1830 to 1835 the pastor of a congregation connected with that body in Perth. He travelled over a large extent of country during that period, preaching on temperance. While at Perth Burns edited the Christian Miscellany. In May 1835 he accepted a call to the pastorate of the general baptist congregation assembling in Ænon Chapel, New Church Street, Marylebone, and in June finally moved with his family to London. His congregation at first was small, but owing to his enthusiasm it increased so much that twice in the first twenty-five years of his ministry at Paddington it was found necessary to enlarge the building in which it worshipped.

Burns had much influence as a preacher and public speaker, especially on temperance. He is said to have been the first clergyman of any denomination to preach teetotalism from the pulpit. He delivered thirty-five annual temperance sermons, beginning 16 December 1839, many of which were published. He was one of the earliest members of the Evangelical Alliance, formed in 1845. In 1847 Burns paid his first visit to America, as one of the two delegates from the General Baptist Association of England at the triennial conference of the Freewill Baptists of the United States.

Burns died at his residence in Porteus Road, Paddington, on 31 January 1876. Wesleyan University in Middletown, Connecticut, conferred upon Burns in 1846 the honorary degree of D.D., to which the faculty of Bates College, Lewiston, Maine, added that of LL.D. in 1872.

== Works ==
He published Notes of a Tour in the United States and Canada in the Summer and Autumn of 1847, in 1848. He visited America again in 1872. In 1869 he visited Egypt and Palestine, and prepared a Helpbook for Travellers to the East; including Egypt, Palestine, Turkey, Greece, and Italy in 1870.

Burns wrote a vast number of religious books year by year. In 1837 he issued a very popular work, entitled The Golden Pot of Manna; or Christian's Portion, containing Daily Exercises on the Person, Offices, Work, and Glory of the Redeemer, published in two volumes. In the fifth edition the title was altered to The Christian's Daily Portion, 1848. Similar works were entitled Christian Exercises for every Lord's Day, morning and evening, in the Year (1858), The Preacher's Magazine and Pastor's Monthly Journal, (published in 66 parts between April 1839 and September 1844), One Hundred Sketches and Skeletons of Sermons, (published in 4 volumes between 1836–9), Sermons, chiefly designed for Family Reading and Village Worship (1842); One Hundred and Fifty Original Sketches and Plans of Sermons (1866) and Two Hundred Sketches and Outlines of Sermons (1875) as preached chiefly in Church Street Chapel on Edgware Road, London from 1866.

Burns prepared and edited the Pulpit Cyclopædia and Christian Minister's Companion in 4 volumes (1844). He also published many other books including The Mothers of the Wise and Good, or select Essays on Maternal Duties and Influence (1846), Christian Philosophy, or Materials for Thought (1845), Light for the House of Mourning: a Book for the Bereaved (1850), The Marriage Gift Book and Bridal Token (1863) and many more.
