= List of United Kingdom locations: Bru-Bun =

The United Kingdom

This is part of the list of United Kingdom locations: a gazetteer of place names in the United Kingdom showing each place's locality and geographical coordinates.

== Br (continued) ==
=== Bru ===
Location	Locality	Coordinates (links to map & photo sources)	OS grid reference
Bruach Mairi (Marybank)	Western Isles	58.20°N 06.42°W	NB4033
Bruan	Highland	58.33°N 03.18°W	ND3139
Bruar	Perth and Kinross	56.76°N 03.93°W	NN8265
Brucefield	Fife	56.05°N 03.44°W	NT1086
Brucehill	West Dunbartonshire	55.94°N 04.59°W	NS3875
Bruche	Cheshire	53.39°N 02.57°W	SJ6289
Brucklebog	Aberdeenshire	57.07°N 02.43°W	NO7498
Brue (Brù)	Western Isles	58.34°N 06.54°W	NB3449
Bruera	Cheshire	53.13°N 02.85°W	SJ4360
Bruern Abbey	Oxfordshire	51.87°N 01.62°W	SP2620
Bruernish (Bruairnis)	Western Isles	56.99°N 07.41°W	NF7102
Bruernish Point	Western Isles	56.98°N 07.38°W	NF731011
Bruichladdich	Argyll and Bute	55.76°N 06.37°W	NR2661
Bruisyard	Suffolk	52.24°N 01.39°E	TM3266
Brumby	North Lincolnshire	53.57°N 00.65°W	SE8909
Brunant	Powys	52.67°N 03.06°W	SJ2809
Brunatwatt	Shetland Islands	60.23°N 01.56°W	HU2450
Brund	Staffordshire	53.14°N 01.85°W	SK1061
Brundall	Norfolk	52.62°N 01.42°E	TG3208
Brundish	Norfolk	52.50°N 01.52°E	TM3995
Brundish	Suffolk	52.27°N 01.32°E	TM2769
Brundish Street	Suffolk	52.28°N 01.31°E	TM2670
Brundon	Suffolk	52.04°N 00.71°E	TL8642
Brunery	Highland	56.77°N 05.73°W	NM7271
Brunnion	Cornwall	50.17°N 05.50°W	SW5036
Brunshaw	Lancashire	53.78°N 02.22°W	SD8532
Brunstane	City of Edinburgh	55.93°N 03.10°W	NT3172
Brunstock	Cumbria	54.92°N 02.92°W	NY4159
Brunswick	Manchester	53.46°N 02.24°W	SJ8497
Brunswick Park	Barnet	51.62°N 00.15°W	TQ2893
Brunswick Village	Newcastle upon Tyne	55.04°N 01.64°W	NZ2372
Bruntcliffe	Leeds	53.73°N 01.62°W	SE2527
Brunthwaite	Bradford	53.91°N 01.92°W	SE0546
Bruntingthorpe	Leicestershire	52.49°N 01.11°W	SP6089
Brunton	Wiltshire	51.30°N 01.65°W	SU2456
Brunton	Fife	56.36°N 03.10°W	NO3220
Bruray	Shetland Islands	60.42°N 00.75°W	HU688720
Brushes	Tameside	53.48°N 02.04°W	SJ9799
Brushfield	Derbyshire	53.23°N 01.77°W	SK1571
Brushford	Somerset	51.01°N 03.54°W	SS9225
Brushford	Devon	50.84°N 03.89°W	SS6707
Bruton	Somerset	51.10°N 02.45°W	ST6834

=== Bry ===
Location	Locality	Coordinates (links to map & photo sources)	OS grid reference
Bryans	Midlothian	55.86°N 03.05°W	NT3464
Bryan's Green	Worcestershire	52.31°N 02.17°W	SO8868
Bryanston	Dorset	50.85°N 02.18°W	ST8706
Bryant's Bottom	Buckinghamshire	51.68°N 00.77°W	SU8599
Brydekirk	Dumfries and Galloway	55.01°N 03.28°W	NY1870
Bryher	Isles of Scilly	49.95°N 06.35°W	SV878150
Brymbo	Conwy	53.22°N 03.79°W	SH8071
Brymbo	Wrexham	53.06°N 03.06°W	SJ2953
Brympton d'Evercy	Somerset	50.93°N 02.69°W	ST5115
Bryn	Shropshire	52.45°N 03.04°W	SO2985
Bryn	Neath Port Talbot	51.61°N 03.72°W	SS8192
Bryn	Carmarthenshire	51.67°N 04.11°W	SN5400
Bryn	Caerphilly	51.64°N 03.21°W	ST1695
Bryn	Swansea	51.61°N 04.13°W	SS5293
Bryn	Rhondda, Cynon, Taff	51.73°N 03.56°W	SN9205
Bryn	St Helens	53.49°N 02.66°W	SD5600
Bryn	Cheshire	53.24°N 02.60°W	SJ6072
Bryn	Gwynedd	53.20°N 04.11°W	SH5970
Bryn	Powys	52.60°N 03.24°W	SJ1602
Brynafan	Ceredigion	52.34°N 03.89°W	SN7173
Brynamman	Carmarthenshire	51.80°N 03.87°W	SN7114
Brynawel	Caerphilly	51.61°N 03.17°W	ST1991
Brynberian	Pembrokeshire	51.98°N 04.76°W	SN1035
Brynbryddan	Neath Port Talbot	51.61°N 03.77°W	SS7792
Brynbuga	Monmouthshire	51.69°N 02.91°W	SO3700
Bryn Bwbach	Gwynedd	52.90°N 04.05°W	SH6236
Bryncae	Rhondda, Cynon, Taff	51.52°N 03.45°W	SS9982
Bryn Celyn	Isle of Anglesey	53.28°N 04.10°W	SH6079
Bryn Celyn	Flintshire	53.27°N 03.23°W	SJ1876
Bryncethin	Bridgend	51.54°N 03.57°W	SS9184
Bryncir	Gwynedd	52.97°N 04.26°W	SH4844
Bryn coch	Neath Port Talbot	51.67°N 03.82°W	SS7499
Bryncoch	Bridgend	51.53°N 03.57°W	SS9183
Bryn Common	Flintshire	53.09°N 03.10°W	SJ2656
Bryncroes	Gwynedd	52.84°N 04.64°W	SH2231
Bryncrug	Gwynedd	52.60°N 04.06°W	SH6003
Brynderwen	Powys	52.54°N 03.24°W	SO1695
Bryndu	Carmarthenshire	51.76°N 04.13°W	SN5309
Bryn Du	Isle of Anglesey	53.21°N 04.48°W	SH3472
Bryn Dulas	Conwy	53.27°N 03.65°W	SH9077
Bryneglwys	Denbighshire	53.01°N 03.28°W	SJ1447
Bryn Eglwys	Gwynedd	53.17°N 04.09°W	SH6066
Brynford	Flintshire	53.25°N 03.24°W	SJ1774
Bryn Gates	Wigan	53.50°N 02.61°W	SD5901
Brynglas	City of Newport	51.59°N 03.01°W	ST3089
Brynglas Sta	Gwynedd	52.60°N 04.03°W	SH6203
Bryngolau	Rhondda, Cynon, Taff	51.58°N 03.44°W	ST0088
Bryngwran	Isle of Anglesey	53.26°N 04.47°W	SH3577
Bryngwyn	Ceredigion	52.07°N 04.49°W	SN2945
Bryngwyn	Powys	52.13°N 03.19°W	SO1849
Bryngwyn	Monmouthshire	51.77°N 02.88°W	SO3909
Brynhenllan	Pembrokeshire	52.01°N 04.91°W	SN0039
Brynheulog	Bridgend	51.63°N 03.66°W	SS8594
Brynhoffnant	Ceredigion	52.13°N 04.44°W	SN3351
Bryniau	Denbighshire	53.30°N 03.41°W	SJ0680
Bryning	Lancashire	53.75°N 02.91°W	SD4029
Brynithel	Blaenau Gwent	51.70°N 03.14°W	SO2101
Bryn Iwan	Carmarthenshire	51.95°N 04.46°W	SN3131
Brynllywarch	Powys	52.49°N 03.25°W	SO1589
Brynmawr	Blaenau Gwent	51.79°N 03.19°W	SO1811
Bryn Mawr	Powys	52.75°N 03.11°W	SJ2518
Bryn-mawr	Gwynedd	52.86°N 04.61°W	SH2433
Brynmenyn	Bridgend	51.54°N 03.58°W	SS9084
Brynmill	Swansea	51.61°N 03.98°W	SS6392
Brynmorfudd	Conwy	53.15°N 03.79°W	SH8064
Bryn Myrddin	Carmarthenshire	51.86°N 04.26°W	SN4421
Brynna	Rhondda, Cynon, Taff	51.53°N 03.47°W	SS9883
Brynnau Gwynion	Bridgend	51.52°N 03.48°W	SS9782
Bryn-newydd	Denbighshire	52.96°N 03.22°W	SJ1841
Bryn Offa	Wrexham	53.03°N 03.01°W	SJ3249
Brynore	Shropshire	52.90°N 02.95°W	SJ3635
Bryn-penarth	Powys	52.62°N 03.33°W	SJ1004
Bryn Pen-y-lan	Wrexham	52.97°N 02.99°W	SJ3342
Bryn Pydew	Conwy	53.29°N 03.80°W	SH8079
Brynrefail	Isle of Anglesey	53.34°N 04.28°W	SH4886
Brynrefail	Gwynedd	53.13°N 04.16°W	SH5562
Bryn Rhyd-yr-Arian	Conwy	53.19°N 03.57°W	SH9567
Bryn-rhys	Conwy	53.26°N 03.80°W	SH8076
Brynsadler	Rhondda, Cynon, Taff	51.51°N 03.41°W	ST0280
Bryn Saith Marchog	Denbighshire	53.03°N 03.38°W	SJ0750
Brynsiencyn	Isle of Anglesey	53.17°N 04.27°W	SH4867
Brynsworthy	Devon	51.05°N 04.09°W	SS5331
Bryn Tanat	Powys	52.78°N 03.12°W	SJ2421
Brynteg	Isle of Anglesey	53.31°N 04.26°W	SH4982
Brynteg	Wrexham	53.06°N 03.04°W	SJ3052
Bryntirion	Bridgend	51.50°N 03.61°W	SS8880
Bryn-y-cochin	Shropshire	52.90°N 02.95°W	SJ3635
Brynygwenin	Monmouthshire	51.83°N 02.97°W	SO3316
Bryn-y-maen	Conwy	53.26°N 03.75°W	SH8376
Bryn-y-mor	Gwynedd	52.57°N 04.11°W	SH5700
Bryn-yr-Eos	Wrexham	52.95°N 03.07°W	SJ2840
Bryn-yr-ogof	Denbighshire	53.09°N 03.21°W	SJ1956

== Bu ==
=== Bua ===
Location	Locality	Coordinates (links to map & photo sources)	OS grid reference
Buaile Dhubh	Western Isles	57.39°N 07.36°W	NF7846
Bualintur	Highland	57.19°N 06.30°W	NG4020

=== Bub ===
Location	Locality	Coordinates (links to map & photo sources)	OS grid reference
Bubbenhall	Warwickshire	52.34°N 01.47°W	SP3672
Bubblewell	Gloucestershire	51.69°N 02.18°W	SO8700
Bubnell	Derbyshire	53.24°N 01.64°W	SK2472
Bubwith	East Riding of Yorkshire	53.81°N 00.92°W	SE7136

=== Buc ===
Location	Locality	Coordinates (links to map & photo sources)	OS grid reference
Buccleuch	Scottish Borders	55.41°N 03.07°W	NT3214
Buchanan Smithy	Stirling	56.06°N 04.47°W	NS4689
Buchanhaven	Aberdeenshire	57.51°N 01.80°W	NK1247
Buchan Hill	West Sussex	51.08°N 00.21°W	TQ2533
Buchan Ness	Aberdeenshire	57.47°N 01.78°W	NK127424
Buchanty	Perth and Kinross	56.43°N 03.73°W	NN9328
Buchany	Stirling	56.19°N 04.08°W	NN7102
Buchley	East Dunbartonshire	55.92°N 04.25°W	NS5972
Buchlyvie	Stirling	56.10°N 04.30°W	NS5793
Buckabank	Cumbria	54.83°N 02.98°W	NY3749
Buckbury	Worcestershire	52.00°N 02.23°W	SO8434
Buckden	Cambridgeshire	52.28°N 00.25°W	TL1967
Buckden	North Yorkshire	54.18°N 02.09°W	SD9477
Buckenham	Norfolk	52.59°N 01.46°E	TG3505
Buckerell	Devon	50.79°N 03.25°W	ST1200
Bucket Corner	Hampshire	50.98°N 01.43°W	SU4021
Buckfast	Devon	50.48°N 03.79°W	SX7367
Buckfastleigh	Devon	50.48°N 03.79°W	SX7366
Buckham	Dorset	50.82°N 02.75°W	ST4703
Buckhaven	Fife	56.17°N 03.04°W	NT3598
Buck Hill	Wiltshire	51.42°N 02.04°W	ST9770
Buckholm	Scottish Borders	55.63°N 02.82°W	NT4838
Buckholt	Monmouthshire	51.84°N 02.72°W	SO5016
Buckhorn	Devon	50.76°N 04.31°W	SX3799
Buckhorn Weston	Dorset	51.01°N 02.35°W	ST7524
Buckhurst	Kent	51.13°N 00.61°E	TQ8340
Buckhurst Hill	Essex	51.61°N 00.03°E	TQ4193
Buckie	Moray	57.67°N 02.99°W	NJ4165
Buckingham	Buckinghamshire	51.99°N 00.99°W	SP6933
Buckland	Surrey	51.23°N 00.25°W	TQ2250
Buckland	Kent	51.13°N 01.28°E	TR3042
Buckland	Hampshire	50.76°N 01.56°W	SZ3196
Buckland (Newton Abbott)	Devon	50.52°N 03.59°W	SX8771
Buckland (Thurlestone)	Devon	50.27°N 03.86°W	SX6743
Buckland	Gloucestershire	52.02°N 01.88°W	SP0836
Buckland	Hertfordshire	51.97°N 00.03°W	TL3533
Buckland	Buckinghamshire	51.79°N 00.72°W	SP8812
Buckland	Oxfordshire	51.67°N 01.50°W	SU3498
Buckland Brewer	Devon	50.95°N 04.26°W	SS4120
Buckland Common	Buckinghamshire	51.74°N 00.66°W	SP9206
Buckland Dinham	Somerset	51.25°N 02.35°W	ST7551
Buckland Down	Somerset	51.25°N 02.40°W	ST7251
Buckland End	Birmingham	52.49°N 01.79°W	SP1488
Buckland Filleigh	Devon	50.86°N 04.18°W	SS4609
Buckland in the Moor	Devon	50.54°N 03.80°W	SX7273
Buckland Marsh	Oxfordshire	51.68°N 01.52°W	SU3399
Buckland Monachorum	Devon	50.49°N 04.14°W	SX4868
Buckland Newton	Dorset	50.84°N 02.44°W	ST6905
Buckland Ripers	Dorset	50.63°N 02.51°W	SY6482
Bucklands	Scottish Borders	55.43°N 02.77°W	NT5116
Buckland St Mary	Somerset	50.91°N 03.03°W	ST2713
Buckland Valley	Kent	51.14°N 01.28°E	TR3043
Bucklandwharf	Buckinghamshire	51.79°N 00.71°W	SP8911
Bucklebury	Berkshire	51.42°N 01.21°W	SU5570
Bucklebury Alley	Berkshire	51.42°N 01.26°W	SU5170
Bucklegate	Lincolnshire	52.89°N 00.02°W	TF3335
Buckleigh	Devon	51.03°N 04.24°W	SS4328
Bucklerheads	Angus	56.51°N 02.87°W	NO4636
Buckler's Hard	Hampshire	50.79°N 01.43°W	SU4000
Bucklesham	Suffolk	52.02°N 01.26°E	TM2441
Buckley	Rochdale	53.63°N 02.15°W	SD9015
Buckley (Bwcle)	Flintshire	53.16°N 03.09°W	SJ2764
Buckley Green	Warwickshire	52.30°N 01.78°W	SP1567
Buckley Hill	Sefton	53.48°N 02.99°W	SJ3499
Bucklow Hill	Cheshire	53.34°N 02.40°W	SJ7383
Buckminster	Leicestershire	52.78°N 00.71°W	SK8722
Buckmoorend	Buckinghamshire	51.72°N 00.78°W	SP8404
Bucknall	City of Stoke-on-Trent	53.02°N 02.15°W	SJ9047
Bucknall	Lincolnshire	53.19°N 00.24°W	TF1768
Bucknell	Shropshire	52.35°N 02.95°W	SO3573
Bucknell	Oxfordshire	51.92°N 01.18°W	SP5625
Buckoak	Cheshire	53.24°N 02.73°W	SJ5172
Buckover	South Gloucestershire	51.60°N 02.49°W	ST6690
Buckpool	Dudley	52.47°N 02.16°W	SO8986
Buckpool	Moray	57.67°N 02.99°W	NJ4165
Buckridge	Worcestershire	52.36°N 02.41°W	SO7274
Bucksburn	City of Aberdeen	57.17°N 02.18°W	NJ8909
Buck's Cross	Devon	50.98°N 04.36°W	SS3423
Bucks Green	West Sussex	51.07°N 00.47°W	TQ0732
Bucks Hill	Hertfordshire	51.68°N 00.48°W	TL0500
Bucks Horn Oak	Hampshire	51.16°N 00.85°W	SU8041
Buckskin	Hampshire	51.25°N 01.14°W	SU6051
Buck's Mills	Devon	50.98°N 04.35°W	SS3523
Buckton	Herefordshire	52.35°N 02.91°W	SO3873
Buckton	East Riding of Yorkshire	54.13°N 00.19°W	TA1872
Buckton Vale	Tameside	53.49°N 02.03°W	SD9800
Buckworth	Cambridgeshire	52.37°N 00.32°W	TL1476

=== Bud ===
Location	Locality	Coordinates (links to map & photo sources)	OS grid reference
Budbrooke	Warwickshire	52.28°N 01.63°W	SP2565
Budby	Nottinghamshire	53.22°N 01.08°W	SK6170
Buddileigh	Staffordshire	53.03°N 02.37°W	SJ7549
Buddon Ness	Angus	56.46°N 02.74°W	NO545307
Bude	Cornwall	50.82°N 04.54°W	SS2106
Budge's Shop	Cornwall	50.40°N 04.36°W	SX3259
Budlake	Devon	50.79°N 03.44°W	SS9800
Budleigh	Somerset	50.96°N 03.16°W	ST1819
Budleigh Salterton	Devon	50.63°N 03.33°W	SY0682
Budlett's Common	East Sussex	50.98°N 00.09°E	TQ4723
Budock Water	Cornwall	50.14°N 05.10°W	SW7832
Budworth Heath	Cheshire	53.29°N 02.51°W	SJ6678

=== Bue ===
Location	Locality	Coordinates (links to map & photo sources)	OS grid reference
Buersil Head	Rochdale	53.58°N 02.13°W	SD9110
Buerton	Cheshire	52.98°N 02.47°W	SJ6843

=== Buf ===
Location	Locality	Coordinates (links to map & photo sources)	OS grid reference
Buffler's Holt	Buckinghamshire	52.00°N 01.03°W	SP6635
Bufton	Leicestershire	52.64°N 01.41°W	SK4005
Bugbrooke	Northamptonshire	52.20°N 01.02°W	SP6757

=== Bug ===
Location	Locality	Coordinates (links to map & photo sources)	OS grid reference
Bugford	Devon	51.16°N 04.00°W	SS6043
Bughtlin	City of Edinburgh	55.95°N 03.31°W	NT1874
Buglawton	Cheshire	53.16°N 02.19°W	SJ8763
Bugle	Cornwall	50.38°N 04.80°W	SX0158
Bugle Gate	Worcestershire	52.30°N 02.26°W	SO8267
Bugley	Dorset	51.01°N 02.31°W	ST7824
Bugley	Wiltshire	51.19°N 02.21°W	ST8544
Bugthorpe	East Riding of Yorkshire	54.00°N 00.82°W	SE7757

=== Bui ===
Location	Locality	Coordinates (links to map & photo sources)	OS grid reference
Building End	Cambridgeshire	52.01°N 00.08°E	TL4337
Buildwas	Shropshire	52.63°N 02.54°W	SJ6304
Builth Road	Powys	52.16°N 03.43°W	SO0253
Builth Wells (Llanfair-Ym-Muallt)	Powys	52.14°N 03.41°W	SO0350

=== Bul ===
Location	Locality	Coordinates (links to map & photo sources)	OS grid reference
Bulbourne	Hertfordshire	51.80°N 00.65°W	SP9313
Bulbridge	Wiltshire	51.06°N 01.88°W	SU0830
Bulby	Lincolnshire	52.82°N 00.44°W	TF0526
Bulcote	Nottinghamshire	52.98°N 01.03°W	SK6544
Buldoo	Highland	58.58°N 03.73°W	NC9967
Bulford	Wiltshire	51.18°N 01.75°W	SU1743
Bulford Camp	Wiltshire	51.18°N 01.72°W	SU1943
Bulkeley	Cheshire	53.08°N 02.70°W	SJ5354
Bulkeley Hall	Shropshire	52.97°N 02.40°W	SJ7342
Bulkington	Warwickshire	52.47°N 01.42°W	SP3986
Bulkington	Wiltshire	51.32°N 02.08°W	ST9458
Bulkworthy	Devon	50.90°N 04.29°W	SS3914
Bullamoor	North Yorkshire	54.34°N 01.40°W	SE3994
Bull Bay (Porthllechog)	Isle of Anglesey	53.41°N 04.37°W	SH4294
Bullbridge	Derbyshire	53.06°N 01.47°W	SK3552
Bullbrook	Berkshire	51.41°N 00.73°W	SU8869
Bulleign	Kent	51.03°N 00.68°E	TQ8830
Bullenhill	Wiltshire	51.31°N 02.15°W	ST8957
Bullen's Green	Hertfordshire	51.73°N 00.24°W	TL2105
Bulley	Gloucestershire	51.86°N 02.35°W	SO7619
Bullgill	Cumbria	54.72°N 03.41°W	NY0938
Bull Hill	Hampshire	50.78°N 01.53°W	SZ3398
Bullhurst Hill	Derbyshire	52.98°N 01.56°W	SK2943
Bullinghope	Herefordshire	52.02°N 02.71°W	SO5137
Bullington	Lincolnshire	53.27°N 00.36°W	TF0977
Bullington	Hampshire	51.17°N 01.34°W	SU4641
Bullo	Gloucestershire	51.77°N 02.46°W	SO6809
Bullock's Horn	Wiltshire	51.60°N 02.03°W	ST9890
Bullockstone	Kent	51.34°N 01.10°E	TR1665
Bulls Cross	Enfield	51.67°N 00.06°W	TQ3499
Bulls Green	Somerset	51.21°N 02.41°W	ST7146
Bull's Green	Norfolk	52.49°N 01.54°E	TM4194
Bull's Green	Hertfordshire	51.83°N 00.15°W	TL2717
Bull's Hill	Herefordshire	51.87°N 02.59°W	SO5920
Bullwood	Argyll and Bute	55.92°N 04.94°W	NS1674
Bullyhole Bottom	Monmouthshire	51.66°N 02.78°W	ST4696
Bulmer	Essex	52.02°N 00.68°E	TL8440
Bulmer	North Yorkshire	54.09°N 00.94°W	SE6967
Bulmer Tye	Essex	52.01°N 00.67°E	TL8438
Bulphan	Essex	51.54°N 00.36°E	TQ6486
Bulstrode	Hertfordshire	51.70°N 00.51°W	TL0302
Bulthy	Powys	52.71°N 03.02°W	SJ3113
Bulverhythe	East Sussex	50.84°N 00.51°E	TQ7708
Bulverton	Devon	50.68°N 03.26°W	SY1188
Bulwark	Monmouthshire	51.62°N 02.68°W	ST5392
Bulwell	Nottinghamshire	53.00°N 01.21°W	SK5345
Bulwell Forest	Nottinghamshire	52.99°N 01.19°W	SK5445
Bulwick	Northamptonshire	52.54°N 01.02°W	SP6694

=== Bum ===
Location	Locality	Coordinates (links to map & photo sources)	OS grid reference
Bumble's Green	Essex	51.72°N 00.02°E	TL4005

=== Bun ===
Location	Locality	Coordinates (links to map & photo sources)	OS grid reference
Bun Abhainn Eadarra	Western Isles	57.93°N 06.85°W	NB1304
Bunacaimb	Highland	56.92°N 05.86°W	NM6588
Bunarkaig	Highland	56.93°N 04.99°W	NN1887
Bunbury	Cheshire	53.11°N 02.65°W	SJ5658
Bunbury Heath	Cheshire	53.10°N 02.67°W	SJ5557
Bunce Common	Surrey	51.20°N 00.28°W	TQ2046
Bunchrew	Highland	57.47°N 04.31°W	NH6145
Bundalloch	Highland	57.28°N 05.50°W	NG8927
Bunessan	Argyll and Bute	56.30°N 06.23°W	NM3821
Bungay	Suffolk	52.44°N 01.42°E	TM3389
Bunkegivie	Highland	57.21°N 04.48°W	NH5017
Bunkers Hill	Oxfordshire	51.84°N 01.31°W	SP4717
Bunkers Hill	Stockport	53.39°N 02.10°W	SJ9389
Bunker's Hill	Lincolnshire	53.05°N 00.12°W	TF2653
Bunker's Hill	Norfolk	52.63°N 01.22°E	TG1809
Bunker's Hill	Cambridgeshire	52.64°N 00.06°E	TF4007
Bunker's Hill	Suffolk	52.54°N 01.68°E	TG5000
Bunloit	Highland	57.29°N 04.49°W	NH5025
Bunmhullin	Western Isles	57.07°N 07.30°W	NF7911
Bunnahabhain	Argyll and Bute	55.88°N 06.12°W	NR4273
Bunny	Nottinghamshire	52.85°N 01.13°W	SK5829
Bunny Hill	Nottinghamshire	52.84°N 01.15°W	SK5728
Bunree	Highland	56.70°N 05.23°W	NN0262
Bunsley Bank	Cheshire	52.99°N 02.49°W	SJ6744
Bunstead	Hampshire	51.01°N 01.38°W	SU4324
Buntingford	Hertfordshire	51.94°N 00.02°W	TL3629
Bunting's Green	Essex	51.93°N 00.66°E	TL8330
Bunwell	Norfolk	52.49°N 01.12°E	TM1293
Bunwell Bottom	Norfolk	52.51°N 01.09°E	TM1095
Bunwell Hill	Norfolk	52.47°N 01.12°E	TM1291
