= Byrnes =

Byrnes is a surname. Notable people with the surname include:

- Adam Byrnes (born 1981), Australian lawyer and retired rugby union player
- Brittany Byrnes (born 1987), Australian actress
- Burke Byrnes (born 1937), American actor
- Catherine Byrnes, New Zealand professor of pediatrics
- Christopher I. Byrnes (1949-2010), American mathematician
- Darcy Rose Byrnes (born 1998), American actress
- Edd Byrnes (1932–2020), American actor
- Eric Byrnes (born 1976), American baseball player and announcer
- Erin Byrnes, American politician
- Esther Byrnes (1867–1946), American biologist and science teacher
- Garrett Byrnes (born 1971), American composer
- Gene Byrnes (1889–1974), American comic artist
- Giselle Byrnes (born 1967), New Zealand historian
- James Byrnes (sailor) (1838–1882), Irish-American sailor and Union Navy officer in the Civil War
- James F. Byrnes (1882–1972), American politician
- Jim Byrnes (actor) (born 1948), American actor and musician
- Jim Byrnes (baseball) (1880–1941), American baseball player
- John A. Byrnes (1897–1963), American lawyer, politician, and judge
- John W. Byrnes (1913–1985), American politician
- Josephine Byrnes (born 1966), Australian actress
- Josh Byrnes (born 1970), American baseball executive
- Josh Byrnes (politician) (born 1974), American politician
- Kevin P. Byrnes (born 1950), U.S. Army general
- Leonie Byrnes (1888–1964), Australian school teacher
- Mark Byrnes (born 1982), Australian soccer player
- Marty Byrnes (born 1956), American basketball player
- Michael Byrnes (writer), American writer
- Michael J. Byrnes (1958–2025), American Roman Catholic bishop
- Norman Byrnes (botanist) (1922–1998), Australian botanist
- Norman Byrnes (lawyer) (1922–2009), American lawyer
- Pam Byrnes (born 1947), American politician
- Pat Byrnes, American cartoonist
- Richard Byrnes (1832–1864), Irish-American Union Army officer in the Civil War
- Rob Byrnes (born 1958), American writer
- Shannon Byrnes (born 1984), Australian rules footballer
- Steve Byrnes (1959–2015), American television announcer and producer
- Syd Byrnes (born 1940), South African cyclist
- Thomas F. Byrnes (1842–1910), American police officer
- Thomas Joseph Byrnes (1860–1898), Australian politician; 12th Premier of Queensland
- Tommy Byrnes (1923–1981), American basketball player
- Tracy Byrnes (born 1970), American business journalist
- Tricia Byrnes (snowboarder) (born 1974), American snowboarder
- William Byrnes (1809–1891), Australian politician
- William B. Byrnes (1906–1989), American politician

== See also ==
- Byrnes Mill, Missouri
- Hale-Byrnes House, Stanton, New Castle County, Delaware
- Byrnes Cove, Ireland
- Burns (surname)
- Byrne
- Byrns
- Bryne (disambiguation)
