= Bryn =

Bryn is a Welsh word meaning hill. It may also refer to:

== Places ==
=== United Kingdom ===
==== England ====
- Bryn, Cheshire, a location
- Bryn, Greater Manchester
  - Bryn (ward), an electoral ward in Wigan
  - Bryn railway station
- Bryn, Shropshire, a location

==== Wales ====
- Bryn, Caerphilly, a location
- Bryn, an electoral division of Conwy County Borough Council
- Bryn, Llanelli, Carmarthenshire
- Bryn, Gwynedd, a location
- The Bryn, a village in Monmouthshire
- Bryn, Neath Port Talbot
- Bryn, Powys, a location
- Bryn, Rhondda Cynon Taf, a location
- Bryn, Swansea, a location

=== Elsewhere ===
- Bryn, Akershus, Bærum, Norway
- Bryn, Oslo, Norway
  - Bryn Station
- Bryn, Ukraine, a village in Ivano-Frankivsk Oblast, Ukraine

== Other uses ==
- Bryn (given name), includes a list of people with the given name
- Bryn (surname), includes a list of people with the surname
- Bryn, a 2003 album by Welsh bass-baritone Bryn Terfel
- "Bryn", a 2008 song by Vampire Weekend from Vampire Weekend

== See also ==
- Bryn Athyn, Pennsylvania, U.S.
- Bryn Mawr, Pennsylvania, U.S.
- Brin (disambiguation)
- Bryna (disambiguation)
- Bryne (disambiguation)
- Brynn (disambiguation)
