= Bryn (given name) =

Bryn is a given name of Welsh origin. England and Wales Census information recorded 2 in 1851, 4 in 1861, 5 in 1871 and 8 in 1881, none being from Wales. When Liberal politician, John Roberts of Bryn Adda, Bangor, became MP for Caernarvonshire in 1885, he adopted Bryn as a first name after the name of his home, to avoid confusion with another John who was already a MP. In the 1891 census, the first Welsh Bryn is recorded, and by the 1901 census there were 28. Notable people with the name include:

- Bryn Allen (1921–2005), Welsh international footballer
- Bryn Apprill (born 1996), American voice actress affiliated with Funimation
- Bryn Atkinson (born 1982), Australian mountain bike racing cyclist
- Bryn Christopher (born 1985), British singer and songwriter
- Bryn Coudraye (born 1986), Australian rower
- Bryn Crossley (1958–2018), Welsh jockey
- Bryn Cunningham (born 1978), Irish rugby union player
- Bryn Davies (footballer) (1917–1990), Welsh professional footballer
- Bryn Davies (musician) (born 1976), American musician
- Bryn Davies, Baron Davies of Brixton (born 1944), British trade unionist, actuary and politician
- Bryn Day (1919–1977), Welsh rugby union and rugby league footballer
- Bryn Elliott (1925–2019), English footballer
- Bryn Evans (disambiguation)
- Bryn Fôn (born 1954), Welsh actor and singer-songwriter
- Bryn Forbes (born 1993), American professional basketball player
- Bryn Gatland (born 1995), New Zealand rugby union player
- Bryn Goldswain, Welsh rugby league footballer
- Bryn Griffiths (writer) (1933-2025), British writer
- Bryn Gunn (born 1958), English footballer
- Bryn Hall (rugby union) (born 1992), New Zealand rugby union player
- Bryn Halliwell (born 1980), English footballer
- Bryn Hargreaves (born 1985), English rugby league player
- Bryn Harrison (born 1969), British experimental composer
- Bryn Haworth (born 1948), British Christian singer-songwriter
- Bryn Hoffman (born 1997), Canadian pair skater
- Bryn Howells (1911–1983), Welsh rugby union and professional rugby league footballer
- Bryn Jones (disambiguation)
- Bryn Kenney (born 1986), American professional poker player
- Bryn Knowelden (1919–2010), English professional rugby league and association footballer
- Bryn Law (born 1969), Welsh football commentator
- Bryn Lewis (1891–1917), Welsh international rugby union player
- Bryn Lockie (born 1968), Scottish cricketer
- Bryn McAuley (born 1989), Canadian voice actress
- Bryn Meredith (born 1930), Wales rugby union international
- Bryn Merrick (1958–2015), Welsh bassist for the rock band The Damned
- Bryn Mooser (born 1979), American filmmaker and entrepreneur
- Bryn Morris (born 1996), English professional footballer
- Bryn Phillips (1900–1980), Welsh dual-code international rugby union and professional rugby league footballer
- Bryn Powell (born 1979), Welsh international rugby league footballer
- Bryn Renner (born 1990), American football player and coach
- Bryn Roberts (1897–1964), Welsh trade union leader
- Bryn Roy (born 1988), Canadian football
- Bryn Smith (born 1955), American baseball player
- Bryn Taylor (born 1980), American fashion stylist
- Bryn Terfel (born 1965), Welsh opera singer
- Bryn Thomas (cricketer) (born 1979), South African cricketer
- Bryn Vaile (born 1956), English sailor
- Bryn Walters, actor, dancer and choreographer
- Bryn West (born 1975), English cricketer
- Bryn Williams (born 1977), Welsh chef
- Bryn Williams-Jones (born 1972), Canadian bioethicist

== In fiction ==
- Bryn, a virtuous chimpanzee and the main protagonist of the 2017 video game Planet of the Apes: Last Frontier.

== See also ==
- Bryn (surname)
