= Brina (disambiguation) =

Brina may refer to:

- Brina, an apple cultivar
- Brina (given name), a feminine given name
- Francesco Brina (1540–1586), Italian painter
- Brina (film), a 2017 Hindi-language Indian film

== See also ==
- Brinna Kelly, U.S. actress and filmmaker
- Briñas, La Rioja, Spain; a town
- Breena
- Bryna (disambiguation)
- Brinn
- Brin (disambiguation)
- Brine (disambiguation)
