= Michael Byrnes =

Michael Byrnes may refer to:

- Michael J. Byrnes (born 1958), American Roman Catholic Archbishop of Agaña on Guam
- Michael Byrnes (writer), American author of 2000s and 2010s archeological thrillers
- Michael Byrnes (born 1990), American mixed martial arts fighter (Strikeforce: Miami#Reported payout)

== See also ==
- Byrnes (disambiguation)
- Michael Burns (disambiguation)
- Michael Byrne (disambiguation)
