= Byrns =

Byrns is a surname. Notable people with the surname include:

- Elinor Byrns (1876–1957), American lawyer and pacifist, co-founder of the Women's Peace Society
- Harold Byrns (1903–1977), German-American conductor and orchestrator
- Joseph W. Byrns Jr. (1903–1973), U.S. attorney and politician
- Jo Byrns (1869–1936), U.S. Democratic politician
- Samuel Byrns (1848–1914), U.S. member of Congress from Missouri

== See also ==
- Burns (surname)
- Byrne
- Byrnes
- Bryne (disambiguation)
- Daniel and Nellie Byrns House
