= Hugo Donais =

Canadian retired cyclist

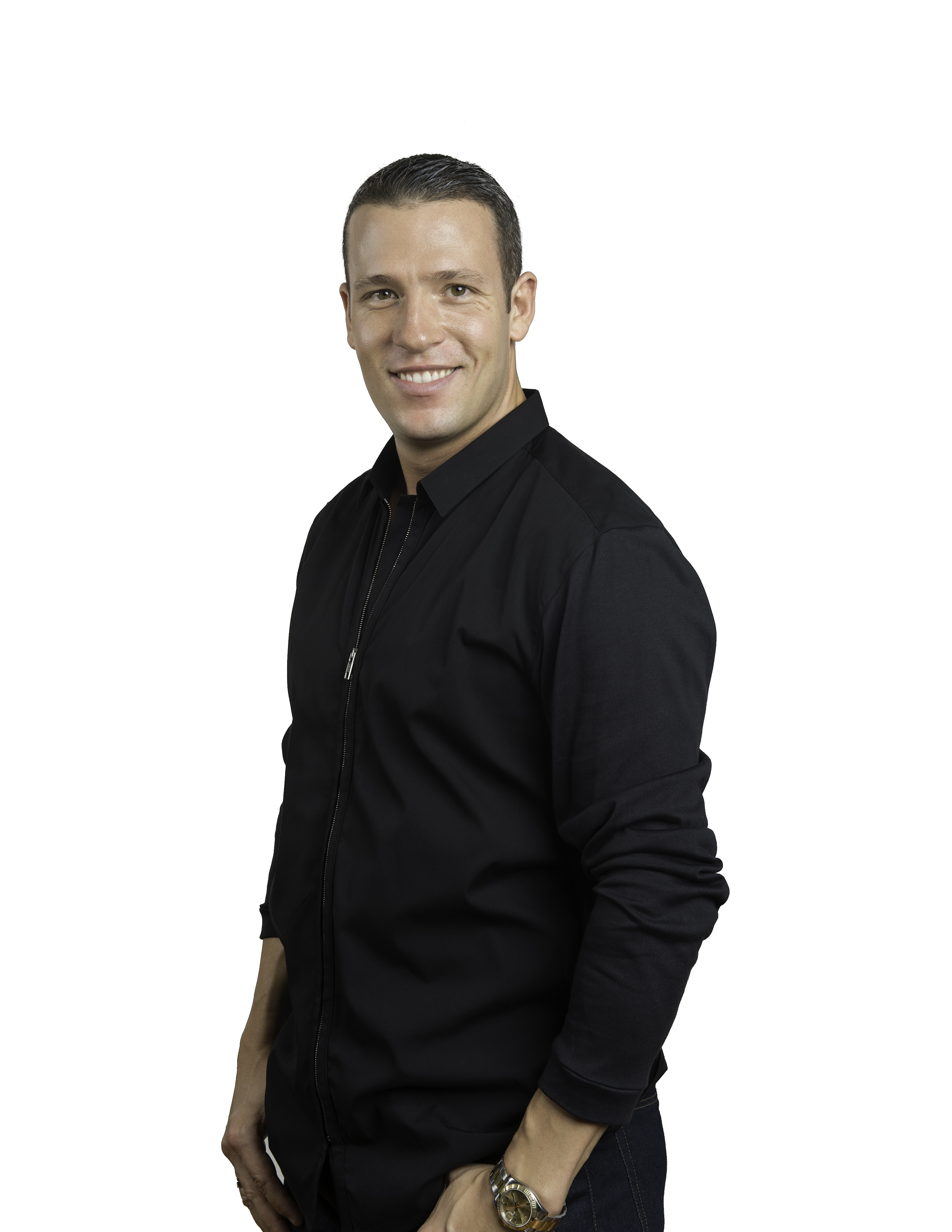

Personal information
- Born: October 14, 1983 (age 43) Laval, Quebec, Canada

Cycling career
- Sport: Cycling
- Current team: Retired
- Disciplines: BMX, MTB
- Role: Rider

Professional teams
- 2001: Rogers AT&T
- 2002: Balfa Cycles Factory Team
- 2003-2005: Norco Factory Team

Hugo Donais (born October 14, 1983) is a Canadian retired cyclist who specialized in downhill mountain biking, four-cross and BMX.

Donais was born in Laval, Quebec, and grew up in nearby Terrebonne. He began racing competitively in 1995 and turned professional in 2001, the same year he won the Junior Canada Cup Series. Donais spent much of his professional career with the Norco Factory Team and was twice selected as a member of the Canadian national cycling team.

During his professional career Donais starred in several cycling-related films and television programs, including Full Throttle, ES2 – Fully Loaded and episodes of Ride Guide.

== UCI career ==
Donais represented Canada twice at the UCI Mountain Bike & Trials World Championships, in 2001 as a junior and in 2003 in the Elite category. He also competed in several UCI Mountain Bike World Cup events between 2002 and 2004.

== Retirement ==
Donais retired from competitive cycling in 2005 and moved to British Columbia the following year. Since 2007 he has pursued a career in financial planning.

== Palmares ==
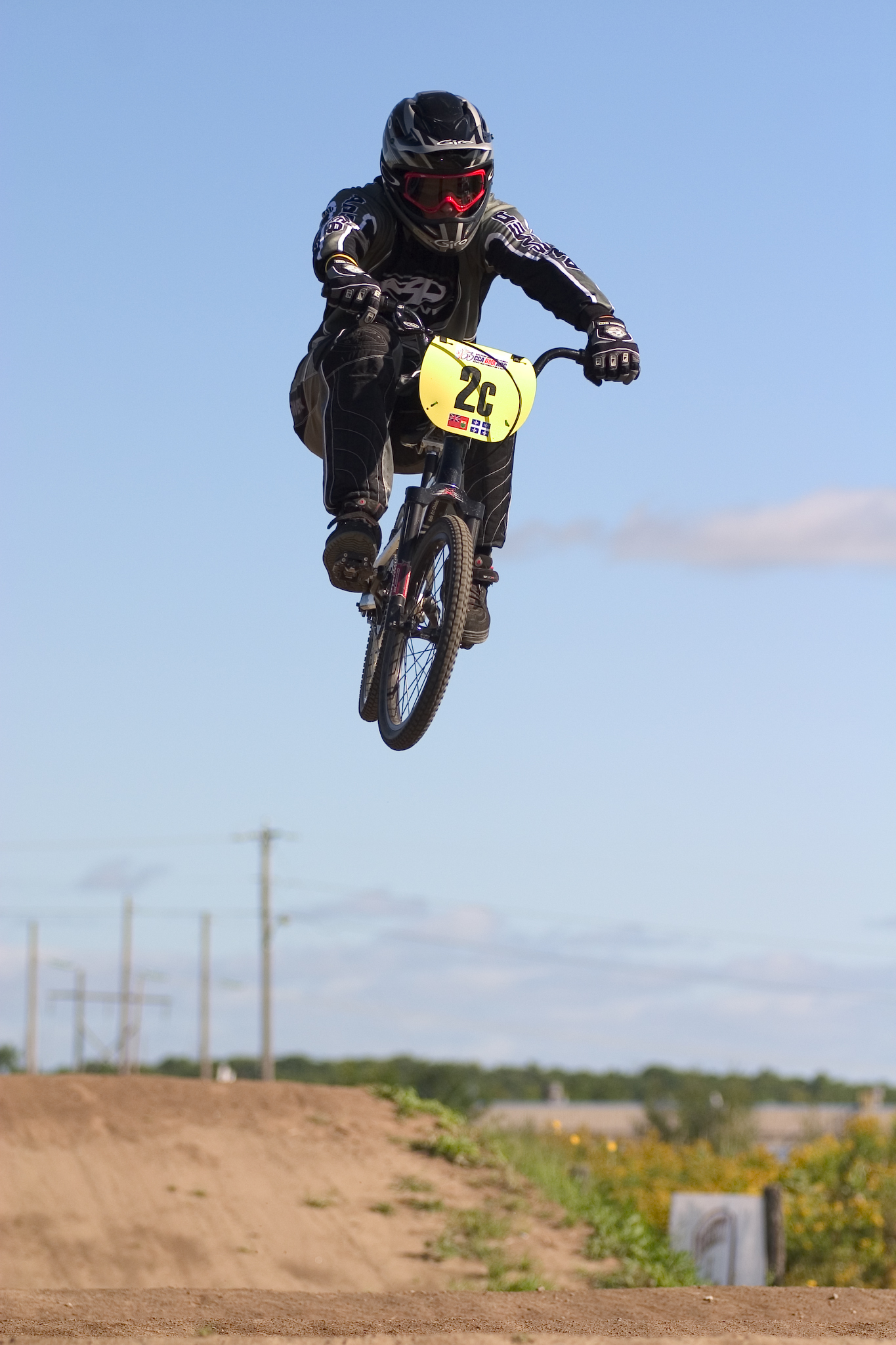
Donais racing in Crabtree, Quebec, 2005.

1999
3rd Overall MTB Nationals Downhill - Cadet Expert Men
2001
1st Overall Mountain Bike Downhill Canada Cup Series - Junior
1st Overall Quebec Cup - Elite
22nd Overall UCI Mountain Bike & Trials World Championships- Junior
2002
1st Overall Quebec Championship
9th Overall Canada Cup Series
2003
1st Overall Calgary Canada Cup
2nd Overall Canada Cup Downhill National Series

1st Stage 1

2nd Overall Toronto International Bike Show BMX Pro Dual
1st Overall Quebec Championship
72nd Overall UCI Mountain Bike & Trials World Championships
2004
2nd Overall Toronto International Bike Show BMX Pro Dual
4th Overall Canada Cup Series
2005
2nd Overall Canadian BMX Eastern National Series
5th Overall UCI Crabtree BMX International
1st Overall Quebec Championship 4-Cross
