= Brynn =

Brynn is a variant of the Welsh given name Bryn. In the United States it is mainly used as a girl's name.

Notable people with the name include:

== People with the given name ==
- Brynn Arens (born 1961), American musician, singer, songwriter, and record producer
- Brynn Cartelli (born 2003), American singer and songwriter
- Brynn Elliott (born 1994), American singer and songwriter
- Brynn Gersmehl, American Christian musician
- Brynn Hartman (born Vicki Omdahl, 1958–1998), wife and murderer of the late Canadian–American actor and comedian Phil Hartman
- Brynn King (born 2000), American pole vaulter
- Brynn Zalina Lovett (born 1993), Malaysian dancer
- Brynn Rumfallo (born 2003), American dancer and television personality
- Brynn Teakle (born 1999), Australian rules football player
- Brynn Thayer (born 1949), American actress

== People with the surname ==
- Edward P. Brynn (born 1942), American diplomat, educator, and historian
- Sol Brynn (born 2000), English soccer player

== See also ==
- Brinn
- Bryn (disambiguation)
- Bryne (disambiguation)
- Bryna (disambiguation)
