= Brine (disambiguation) =

Brine is water saturated or nearly saturated with salt.

Brine can also refer to:

- Brining, treating food by steeping in brine
- Brine (brand), a sporting goods manufacturer
- Brine Lacrosse, mobile game
- Brine pool, areas of brine on the ocean basin
- Brine shrimp, the genus Artemia
- Brine (surname)
