= Holm Jølsen =

Norwegian industrial pioneer and plant owner

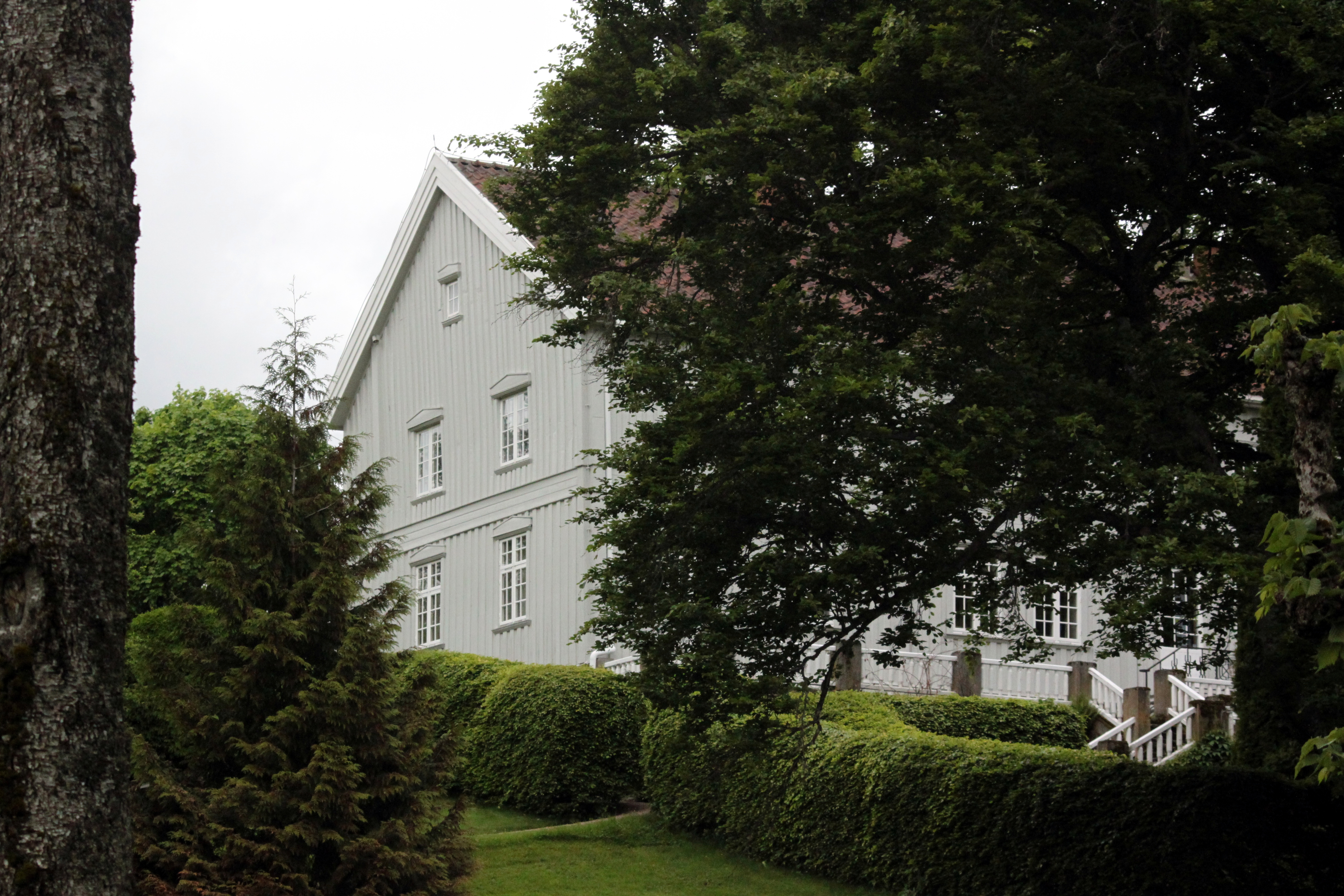
- Ekeberg farm in Enebakk
- Born: 6 December 1833; Rælingen in Akershus, Norway
- Died: 1 August 1906 (aged 72); Enebakk in Akershus, Norway
- Occupations: Industrial pioneer and plant owner
- Known for: Father of writer Ragnhild Jølsen

Holm Pedersen Jølsen (6 December 1833 – 1 August 1906) was a Norwegian industrial pioneer and plant owner.

He was born near the village Rælingen in Akershus, Norway. In 1859 he took over the family farm Ekeberg in the parish of Enebakk (Ekeberg gård i Enebakk). In 1866, he established Jølsens Tændstikfabrik, which developed into one of the larger match factories in Norway in the 1870s, with about 300 employees. In 1886, the factory was re-located from Ekebergdalen to Bryn in Aker. In 1887 he established Enebak Cellulosefabrik, which was one of the first pulp mills in Norway. Following a large fire in 1893, Jølsen was bankrupt.

Holm Jølsen was married to Pauline Lovise Holmsen (1836–1903). Their daughter Ragnhild Jølsen (1875-1908) was the subject of the book Drømmen og hjulet written by Jens Bjørneboe and published in 1964.
