= Bryn (surname) =

'Bryn' is a surname of Welsh origin, meaning 'Hill'.

Notable people with the surname include:

- Alexia Bryn (1889–1983), Norwegian pair skater
- Alfred Jørgen Bryn (1862–1937), Norwegian patent engineer
- Halfdan Bryn (1864–1933), Norwegian physical anthropologist
- Olaf Bryn (1872–1948), Norwegian politician
- Thomas Bryn (1782–1827), Norwegian jurist, magistrate and civil servant
- Yngvar Bryn (1881–1947), Norwegian track and field athlete and pair skater

== See also ==
- Bryn (given name)
- Brynn (disambiguation)
- Bryne (disambiguation)
