= Michael Burns =

Michael, Mick, Mickey, Micky, or Mike Burns may refer to:

== Entertainment industry figures ==
- Michael Burns (actor) (born 1947), American performer during 1960s and 1970s; later historian and academic
- Mickey Burns, American interviewer on 2011 TV program Profiles
- Mike Burns (actor) (born 1952), English performer in BBC sitcom The Brittas Empire
- Michael Burns (executive) (born 1958), American vice chairman of Lionsgate
- Mike Burns (producer) (born 1972), American music producer
- Burnie Burns (Michael Justin Burns, born 1973), American independent filmmaker

=== Characters ===
- Mike Burns, regular for two months on Australian soap opera (List of Neighbours characters (1997))

== Politicians ==
- Michael Burns (Tennessee politician) (1813–1896), Irish-born American banker and businessman
- Mike Burns (South Carolina politician) (born 1952), American state legislator
- Michael W. Burns (born 1958), American legislator in Maryland House of Delegates

== Sportspeople ==
=== Football players ===
- Mick Burns (footballer) (1908–1982), English goalkeeper
- Micky Burns (born 1946), English footballer
- Mike Burns (American football) (born 1954), American defensive back
- Michael Burns (Gaelic footballer) (1961–2015), Irish Gaelic midfielder
- Mike Burns (soccer) (born 1970), American defender
- Michael Burns (English footballer) (born 1988), English midfielder

=== Other sportsmen ===
- Mick Burns (hurler) (1937–2023), Irish right wing-back
- Mike Burns (basketball) (born 1962), American college coach
- Mike Burns (cricketer) (born 1969), English all-rounder and later umpire
- Mike Burns (baseball) (born 1978), American pitcher

== See also ==
- Michael Byrne (disambiguation)
- Michael Byrnes (disambiguation)
