= Saramură =

Romanian sauce for marinating

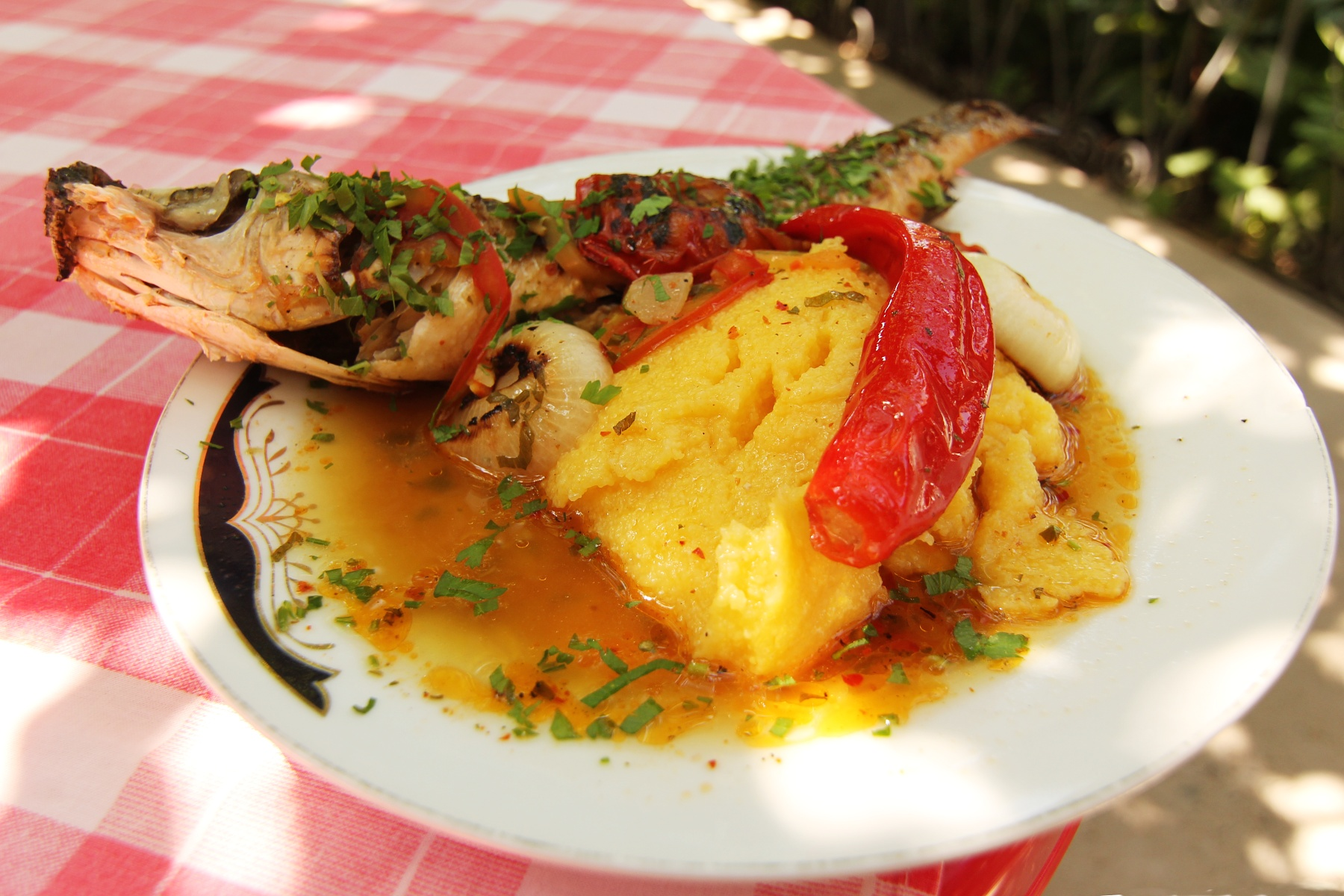
Saramură de chefal (Flathead mullet saramură)

Saramură is a traditional Romanian dish, generally based on different kinds of fish, especially in Dobruja, and dried or smoked meat in Moldova and Transylvania. Recipes vary greatly, the common part being fish/meat is grilled (sometimes on a salt bed) and afterwards soaked, sprinkled, or boiled in brine or brine-based sauce is added. Usually the dish includes vegetables, mamaliga, polenta, potatoes, etc.

The Romanian word "saramură" itself means "brine".

Lipovans would call the dish rassol, e.g., saramură de crap (carp saramura) is called karp rassol. Saramură de crap is often translated as "carp in brine" or "salted carp".
