= Breena =

Breena may refer to:

- Breena, a variant spelling of the Irish feminine given name Bryna (given name)
- Breena Clarke, scholar of African-American studies and fiction writer
- Breena Palmer (a.k.a. Breena Slater), NCIS fictional TV character
- Breena the Demagogue, Magic: The Gathering fictional game character, appearing in Battle for Baldur's Gate / Commander Legends 2
- Sabrina Carpenter, American singer-songwriter

== See also ==
- Brina (disambiguation)
- Bryna (disambiguation)
