= Ryan Leech =

Personal information
- Full name: Ryan Leech
- Born: February 20, 1979 (age 47) Vernon, BC
- Height: 6 ft 0 in (1.83 m)
- Weight: 170 lb (77 kg)

Cycling career
- Sport: Cycling
- Disciplines: Mountain Biking and Trials
- Role: Rider
- Rider type: Trials

Professional team
- 21: Norco Factory Team, Shimano

Ryan Leech (born February 20, 1979, in British Columbia, Canada) is a professional trials mountain bike rider.

At age 13 he began racing cross-country and downhill mountain bikes. In the spring of 1996, Leech joined Team ORB which subsequently changed into The Norco Factory Team in 1998. He began coaching for The West Coast School of Mountain Biking at age 16, introduced to him by his childhood friend Riley Nacke. He attended Seaquam Secondary School in North Delta and missed his high school graduation formal for a competition.

In 2004, Leech produced and starred in his own film, Manifesto, where he attempted to transform trials riding by eliminating setup and recovery hops. In late 2005, Leech released his second DVD, Mastering the Art of Trials, which was an instructional compilation of 38 trials related skills.

Leech performed three stints as a bicycle artist for Cirque du Soleil's La Nouba show in Orlando Florida in the late 90s and early 2000s; he had three short contracts totalling 6 months as substitute for Doug White.

In 2006, Leech created a school program called Trials of Life. In 2007, Leech finished filming his new film, Crux. The film features riders such as Thomas Ohler, Dylan Korba, and Leech himself.

Leech launched an online course called 'The 30 Day Wheelie Challenge' in April 2015 after which he created a paid-membership based website called 'Ryan Leech Connection Online Mtn Bike Skills Coaching' where Leech teaches a wide variety of mountain bike skills, along with mental and physical fitness training.
