= Bryn Jones =

Bryn Jones may refer to:

- Bryn Jones (footballer, born 1912) (1912–1985), Welsh footballer
- Bryn Jones (footballer, born 1931) (1931–1990), Welsh footballer
- Bryn Jones (footballer, born 1938), English professional footballer
- Bryn Jones (footballer, born 1939), Welsh footballer
- Bryn Jones (footballer, born 1948), Welsh footballer
- David Bryn-Jones (1883–?), Welsh-born historian, professor, Baptist minister, and biographer
- Delme Bryn-Jones (1934–2001), Welsh baritone singer
- Bryn Terfel (born 1965), opera singer, born as Bryn Jones
- Muslimgauze (1961–1999), British electronic-music artist born Bryn Jones
- Brynley Jones (born 1959), former footballer with Chester (name sometimes shortened to Bryn)
- Ginger Jones (1905–1986), ring name of Welsh champion boxer Bryn Jones
