= Cass Byrnes =

New Zealand professor of paediatrics

- Other name: Catherine Ann Byrnes

Academic background
- Education: University of Auckland, University of New South Wales
- Thesis: Non-invasive method of measuring airway inflammation: exhaled nitric oxide (2008)
- Doctoral advisor: Andrew Bush, Peter J. Barnes, Innes Asher

Catherine Ann Byrnes is a New Zealand academic paediatrician, and is a full professor at the University of Auckland, specialising in respiratory disease in children, including cystic fibrosis and infectious diseases.

== Academic career ==
Byrnes completed a PhD titled Non-invasive method of measuring airway inflammation: exhaled nitric oxide at the University of Auckland. Byrnes then joined the faculty of the University of Auckland, rising to full professor. Byrnes is the chair of the New Zealand Respiratory and Sleep Clinical Network, and a member of the Cystic Fibrosis New Zealand Clinical Advisory Panel.

Byrnes's research focuses on respiratory diseases in children, including infectious diseases such as RSV, influenza and COVID-19, and conditions such as cystic fibrosis. Byrnes and her colleagues invented a game, called BreatheHero, to help children undergoing physiotherapy for cystic fibrosis complete their daily exercises. She also supervised research on treatment experiences for children with bronchiectasis, which normally required a two week stay in hospital for intravenous antibiotics. The research team found that shortening the stay in hospital to one week, followed by oral antibiotics at home, had the same treatment outcomes but provided a much better experience for patients and their families. Byrnes was part of a two-year multi-disciplinary collaboration between ESR and the University of Auckland aimed at reducing the spread of infectious respiratory viruses, the Southern Hemisphere Influenza and Vaccine Effectiveness Research and Surveillance V (SHIVERS-V).

== Selected works ==
- J Twiss; R Metcalfe; E Edwards; Byrnes, Catherine A. (2005). "New Zealand national incidence of bronchiectasis "too high" for a developed country". Archives of Disease in Childhood. 90 (7): 737–740. doi:10.1136/adc.2004.066472. PMC 1720490. PMID 15871981. Wikidata Q35284122.
- Valery, Patricia; Peter S Morris; Byrnes, Catherine A.; et al. (2013). "Long-term azithromycin for Indigenous children with non-cystic-fibrosis bronchiectasis or chronic suppurative lung disease (Bronchiectasis Intervention Study): a multicentre, double-blind, randomised controlled trial". The Lancet. Respiratory medicine. 1 (8): 610–620. doi:10.1016/s2213-2600(13)70185-1. PMID 24461664. Wikidata Q42231438.
- Claire E. Wainwright; Suzanna Vidmar; David S. Armstrong; et al. (2011). "Effect of bronchoalveolar lavage-directed therapy on Pseudomonas aeruginosa infection and structural lung injury in children with cystic fibrosis: a randomized trial". JAMA. 306 (2): 163–171. doi:10.1001/jama.2011.954. PMID 21750293. Wikidata Q38488018.
- Anne B Chang; Scott C Bell; Byrnes, Catherine A.; et al. (2010). "Chronic suppurative lung disease and bronchiectasis in children and adults in Australia and New Zealand". Medical Journal of Australia. 193 (6): 356–365. doi:10.5694/j.1326-5377.2010.tb03949.x. PMID 20854242. Wikidata Q37790394.
- Rosalyn J Singleton; Valery, Patricia; Peter Morris; et al. (2013). "Indigenous children from three countries with non-cystic fibrosis chronic suppurative lung disease/bronchiectasis". Pediatric Pulmonology. 49 (2): 189–200. doi:10.1002/ppul.22763. PMID 23401398. Wikidata Q30223383.
- E A Edwards; M I Asher; Byrnes, Catherine A. (2003). "Paediatric bronchiectasis in the twenty-first century: experience of a tertiary children's hospital in New Zealand". Journal of Paediatrics and Child Health. 39 (2): 111–117. doi:10.1046/j.1440-1754.2003.00101.x. PMID 12603799. Wikidata Q35072315.
