= Ragnhild Jølsen =

Norwegian writer (1875–1908)

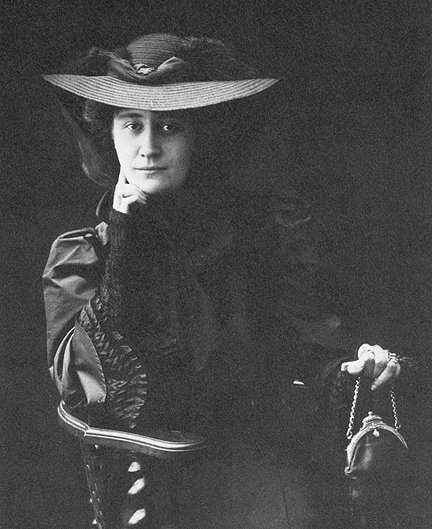
- Born: 29 March 1875; Enebakk, Norway
- Died: 28 January 1908 (aged 32); Enebakk, Norway
- Occupation: author
- Writing career
- Period: 1903–1908

Ragnhild Theodora Jølsen (28 March 1875 – 28 January 1908) was a Norwegian author. Norwegian oral traditions were a recurring theme in her works. Her writings often focused on the conflict between the old rural society and modern industrial society.

== Biography ==
Ragnhild Jølsen grew up on the historic Ekeberg farm (Ekeberg gård) in Enebakk, Akershus, Norway. This large farm had been in her family since 1634 and remained so until sold in 1903. Ragnhild Jølsen was youngest of nine children, four of whom died early. She moved to Kristiania in 1889 after the family had been hit hard financially. Her father, Holm Jølsen (1833–1906) was an early industrial pioneer and ran Norway's third largest match factory in Ekebergdalen between 1866 and 1886. She completed grammar school in 1891. Ragnhild Jølsen moved back to Enebakk in 1896. She attended a local girls' school (Nissens pikeskole). She later worked as a governess with relatives in Enebakk (1897–1898).

Jølsen was seen as a controversial author in a period of great change, as society transformed itself from the old ways founded on small farming communities into the modern industrial society. Short, chopped-up sentences were typical of her writing style, almost maniacally sounding, as in Biblical form, and her depictions always moved in the intersection between dream and reality. Having received a grant she traveled to Rome in November 1906 and returned to Enebakk in July 1907. There she began an affair with the married Norwegian painter Carl Dørnberger (1864–1940).

Jølsen died in January 1908, allegedly having taken an overdose of sleeping powder. She left for posterity some of Norwegian literature's most forceful depictions of agony-manifesting women. Both in her private life and as a writer she was an outsider, and during most of her short life she lived the life of a bohemian. Add to that her books which shocked her contemporaries with their open depictions of the sex lives and drives of women which caused some reviewers to assert that it had to be a man and not a woman who had written them.

For most of the period since her death she has wrongly been portrayed in Norway as a representative of a contemporary class of homestead writers, when in fact only her short story collection Brukshistorier ("Factory Tales") belongs to this genre. The quite different style which characterizes the bulk of her novels is the meandering motifs of Art Nouveau and a consistent fatalistic decadence which depicts itself in her intense and admirable authorship.

In 1938, a memorial stone was erected with a bronze relief of Ragnhild Jølsen in her home community of Enebakk. In 2008, the municipality organized events to commemorate the centennial of her death. In 1964, Jens Bjørneboe partially depicted her life in the biographical novel Drømmen og Hjulet ("The Dream and the Wheel"). In 1988, Aschehoug published the works of Ragnhild Jølsen in a new edition with an additional release in 2008. In 2008, Håkon Tysdal wrote Fra Ign til Fontana di Trevi - en reise gjennom Ragnhild Jølsens siste leveår ("From Ign to Fontana di Trevi - a Journey Through the Last Years of Ragnhild Jølsen's Life"). A new biography written by Arnhild Skre was also published in the autumn of 2008. Moys, a rock band from Enebakk, has composed music to go along with Ragnhild Jølsen's texts in the album Måneskinn og tåke ("Moonlight and Mist") released in November 2009.

== Bibliography ==
- Ve's mor (1903)
- Rikka Gan (1904)
- Fernanda Mona (1905)
- Hollases Krønike (1906)
- Brukshistorier (1907)
- Efterlatte arbeider (1908)

== Other sources ==
- Tiberg, Antonie Ragnhild Jølsen i liv og digtning (Aschehoug. 1909)
- Ribsskog, Øyvin Ragnhild Jølsens saga (Ski. 1976)
- Christensen, Kari Portrett på mørk treplate. Ragnhild Jølsens liv og forfatterskap (Aschehoug. 1989) ISBN 82-03-15975-3
- Norddahl, Helge Tre kyss for den ensomme fugl. Syv essays om Ragnhild Jølsens diktning (Aschehoug. 1991)
- Skre, Arnhild La meg bli som leoparden: Ragnhild Jølsen - en biografi (2009) ISBN 978-82-03-29187-6
