= Milton of Buchanan =

Coordinates: 56.0807°N 4.5032°W

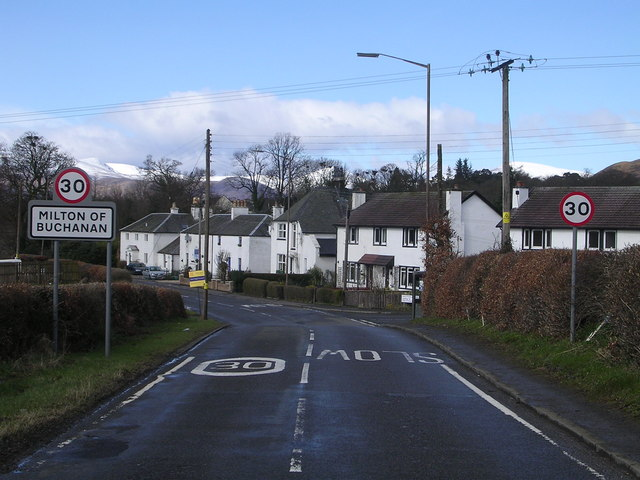
- The main street on the outskirts of Milton of Buchanan

- Location within the Stirling council area
- OS grid reference: NS442903
- Civil parish: Buchanan
- Council area: Stirling
- Lieutenancy area: Stirling and Falkirk
- Country: Scotland
- Sovereign state: United Kingdom
- Post town: Glasgow
- Postcode district: G63
- Dialling code: 01360
- Police: Scotland
- Fire: Scottish
- Ambulance: Scottish
- UK Parliament: Stirling and Strathallan
- Scottish Parliament: Stirling

Milton of Buchanan is a small village in Stirling, Scotland, within the parish of Buchanan. Historically, the village was in the Registration County of Stirlingshire. It was the main village of the parish of Buchanan. However, the village is now a quiet collection of houses along with a school, village hall, and church.

== Facilities ==
The village has a village hall and a parish church with a small graveyard. Buchanan Primary School, now permanently closed, is situated in the village and the local high school is Balfron High School in the nearby village of Balfron.

There are no shops in the village. However, people can go to the nearby villages of Balmaha or Drymen to buy things.

== See also ==
- Balmaha
- Buchanan Smithy
