= Michael Byrne =

Michael Byrne may refer to:

== Entertainment ==
- Michael Byrne (actor) (1939–2026), English actor
- Michael Byrne (poet) (born 1978), Australian poet
- Mike Byrne (guitarist), American guitarist for The Methadones
- Mike Byrne (musician) (born 1990), American drummer with Smashing Pumpkins
- Michael Byrne (artist) (1923–1989), Irish painter

== Sports ==
- Mick Byrne (Australian footballer) (born 1958), Australian rules footballer
- Michael Byrne (baseball) (born 1997), American baseball pitcher
- Michael Byrne (footballer, born 1880) (1880–1931), English-born Irish footballer with Chelsea, Southampton and Glossop
- Michael Byrne (footballer, born 1985), English-born Welsh footballer playing for Chainat
- Michael Byrne (gridiron football) (born 1986), American football offensive lineman
- Michael Byrne (hurler) (born 1978), Irish hurler
- Mick Byrne (Irish footballer) (born 1960), Irish footballer
- Mickey Byrne (1923–2016), Irish hurler

== Other ==
- Michael Byrne (sailor) (1761–after 1792), born in Kilkenny, Ireland
- Michael J. Byrne (1941–2020), Australian oncologist
- Old Man Belfield (born Michael Byrne; 1949–2021), Irish homeless man

== See also ==
- Micky Burn (1912–2010), English journalist
- Michael Burns (disambiguation)
