= Bryna =

Bryna may refer to:

- Bryna (given name), an Irish feminine given name
- Laura Bryna, a U.S. country music singer
- Bryna, a subgenus of the genus Polyommatus, a genus of butterfly
- Bryna Productions (a.k.a. The Bryna Company), a U.S. TV and film production company
- Tropical Storm Bryna (1991), Indian Ocean

== See also ==
- Brynna, Wales, UK; a village
- Brynna Maxwell, U.S. basketball player
- Brynna Drummond, U.S. voice actress; daughter of Brian Drummond
- Brynäs IF, Gävle, Sweden; a men's ice hockey club
- Brynäs IF (women), Gävle, Sweden; a women's ice hockey club
- Brynäs IF Fotboll, Gävle, Sweden; a soccer club
- Gefle IF/Brynäs, Gävle, Sweden; a soccer club
- Breena
- Brina (disambiguation)
- Bryne (disambiguation)
- Brynn (disambiguation)
- Bryn (disambiguation)
