= Arnhild Skre =

- Born: Arnhild Johanna Skre; May 19, 1952 (age 74); Bergen, Norway
- Occupations: Editor, historian, biographer
- Spouse: Nils Butenschøn

Arnhild Johanna Skre (born 19 May 1952) is a Norwegian newspaper editor, press historian and biographer.

== Biography ==
Arnhild Johanna Skre was born in Bergen. She finished her secondary education in 1971 and the Nansen Academy in 1972. In 1977 she graduated from the University of Oslo with the cand.mag. degree in social anthropology, ethnology and history. In 1978 she studied at the University of Iceland. In 2003 she took the cand.philol. degree in history.

She worked in NRK Hordaland from 1979 to 1983, and was then a freelancer for NRK, Dag og Tid and Jeg until 1986. She was then hired permanently in the weekly Dag og Tid, and was its editor-in-chief from 1990 to 1994. From 1995 to 1999 she led the cultural feature desk of Aftenposten.

She chaired Norsk Pressehistorisk Forening from 2003 to 2010 and edited the journal Pressehistorisk tidsskrift from 2010 to 2014. She released a biography on Ragnhild Jølsen in 2008 and Hulda Garborg in 2011. The latter won the Brage Prize. She also contributed to 2010's Norsk presses historie 1660–2010.

She resides in Ytre Enebakk and is married to Nils Butenschøn.
