= Brunnion =

Coordinates: 50.1765°N 5.4967°W

- Location within Cornwall
- OS grid reference: SW504365
- Unitary authority: Cornwall
- Ceremonial county: Cornwall
- Region: South West
- Country: England
- Sovereign state: United Kingdom
- Post town: Hayle
- Postcode district: TR27
- Police: Devon and Cornwall
- Fire: Cornwall
- Ambulance: South Western

Brunnion is a hamlet between Trencrom and Nancledra in west Cornwall, England, UK. It is in the civil parish of Ludgvan
