= Buchanan, Stirling =

Parish in Stirling, Scotland

Coordinates: 56°5′N 4°32.24′W

Buchanan is a historic parish located in Stirlingshire, Scotland, surrounded by Arrochar to the north, Luss to the south, and Drymen to the east.

It includes a large part of the eastern shore of Loch Lomond. The most populated village in the parish is Milton of Buchanan, but the village that is most popular with tourists is Balmaha.

== Settlements ==
- Balmaha
- Buchanan Smithy
- Cashel Farm
- Inversnaid
- Milarrochy
- Milton of Buchanan
- Rowardennan
- Rowchoish
- Sallochy
