= Peter Disera =

Canadian cyclist

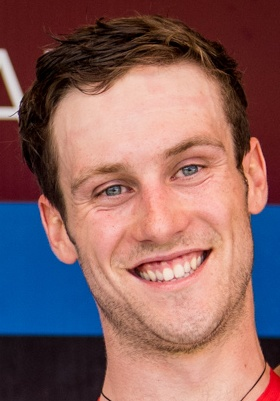

Personal information
- Born: 21 February 1995 (age 31) Kitchener, Ontario, Canada
- Height: 178 cm (5 ft 10 in)
- Weight: 71 kg (157 lb)

Cycling career
- Sport: Cycling
- Disciplines: Road; Mountain bike
- Role: Rider
- Rider type: All-rounder

Professional teams
- 2015–2017: H&R Block Pro Cycling
- 2022: Norco Factory Team

Peter Disera (born 21 February 1995) is a Canadian bicycle racer, who competes in road and mountain biking. Disera's best result on the World Cup circuit is a sixth in 2019.

== Career ==
=== Olympics ===
In July 2021, Disera was named to Canada's 2020 Olympic team.

== Major results ==
2013
1st National Junior Time Trial Championships
2014
3rd National Under-23 Time Trial Championships
