= Bryngolau =

Village in Ceredigion, Wales

Coordinates: 52.068343°N 4.276648°W

- Location within Ceredigion
- OS grid reference: SN 4405 4355
  - Cardiff: 62.2 mi (100.1 km)
  - London: 181.5 mi (292.1 km)
- Community: Llandysul
- Principal area: Ceredigion
- Country: Wales
- Sovereign state: United Kingdom
- Post town: Llandysul
- Postcode district: SA44
- Police: Dyfed-Powys
- Fire: Mid and West Wales
- Ambulance: Welsh
- UK Parliament: Ceredigion Preseli
- Senedd Cymru – Welsh Parliament: Ceredigion

Bryngolau is a small village in the community of Llandysul, Ceredigion, Wales, which is 62.2 miles (100.1 km) from Cardiff and 181.5 miles (292.1 km) from London. Bryngolau is represented in the Senedd by Elin Jones (Plaid Cymru) and is part of the Ceredigion Preseli constituency in the House of Commons.

== See also ==
- List of localities in Wales by population
