= Bryn Day =

Wales international rugby league & union footballer

Personal information
- Full name: Brynley Day
- Born: 24 November 1919; Bridgend, Wales
- Died: 26 September 1977 (aged 57); Oldham, England

Playing information

Rugby union
Club
Years	Team	Pld	T	G	FG	P
≤1947–47	Bridgend RFC

Rugby league
- Position: Prop, Loose forward
Club
Years	Team	Pld	T	G	FG	P
1947	Warrington	18	4	0	0	12
1950–53	Oldham	75	3	1	0	11
	Total	93	7	1	0	23
Representative
Years	Team	Pld	T	G	FG	P
1952	Wales	2	0	0	0	0

Bryn Day (24 November 1919 – 26 September 1977) was a Welsh rugby union, and professional rugby league footballer who played in the 1940s and 1950s. He played club level rugby union (RU) for Bridgend RFC, and representative level rugby league (RL) for Wales, and at club level for Warrington, and Oldham, as a prop or loose forward.

== Background ==
Bryn Day's birth was registered in Bridgend district, Wales, and his death aged 57 was registered in Oldham district, Greater Manchester, England.

== Playing career ==
=== International honours ===
Bryn Day won caps for Wales while at Oldham 1952 2-caps.

=== Club career ===
Bryn Day made his début for Warrington on 8 February 1947, and he played his last match for Warrington on 30 August 1947.
