= Daniel and Nellie Byrns House =

Historic house in Wisconsin, United States

- U.S. National Register of Historic Places
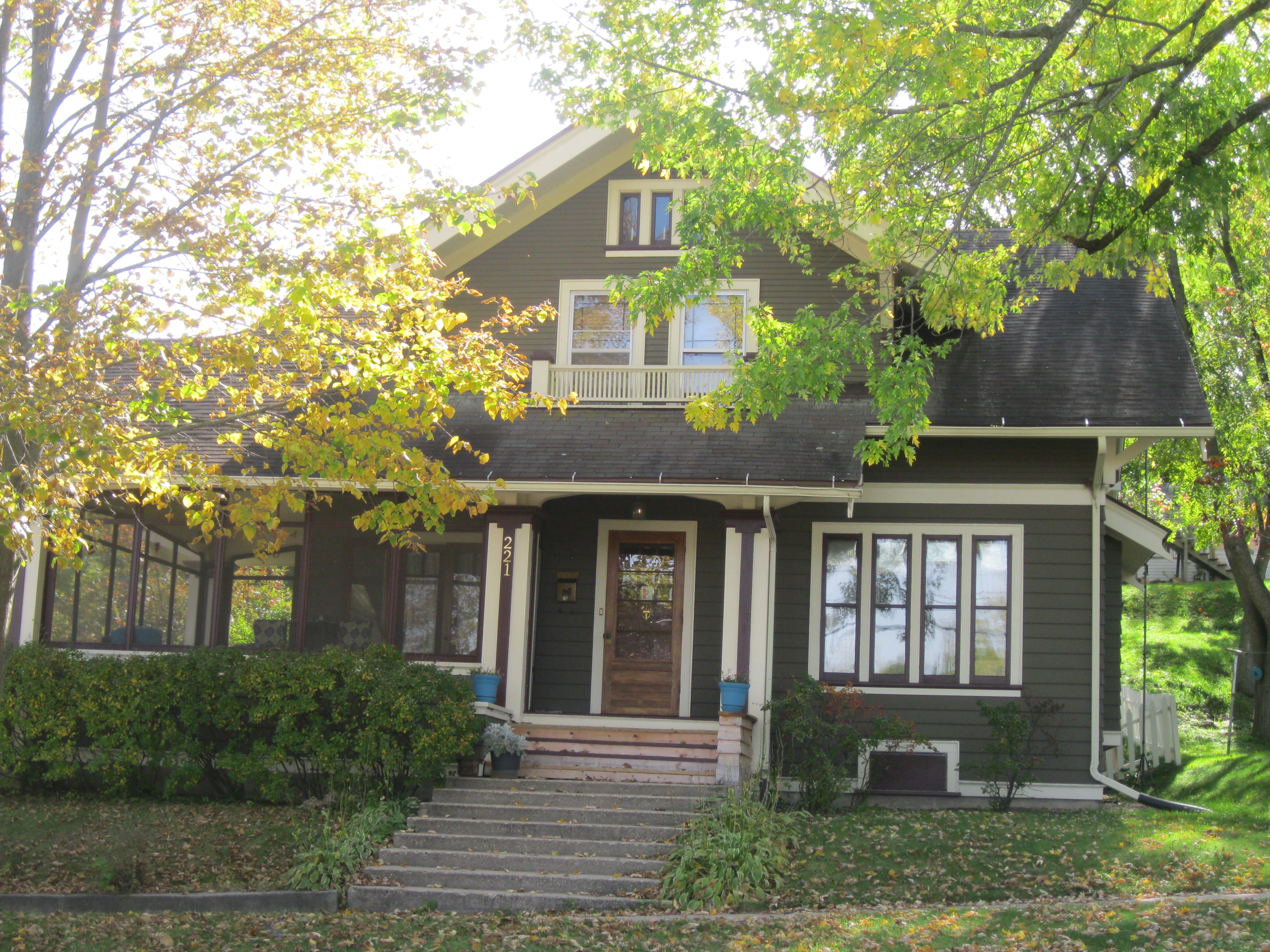

- Location within Wisconsin Location within the United States
- Location: 221 Mill St., Lodi, Wisconsin
- Coordinates: 43°18′42″N 89°31′41″W
- Area: less than one acre
- Built: 1915
- Architectural style: Bungalow
- NRHP reference No.: 08001000
- Added to NRHP: October 16, 2008

The Daniel and Nellie Byrns House is a historic house at 221 Mill Street in Lodi, Wisconsin.

== History ==
The house was built in 1915 for local grocer Daniel Byrns and his wife Nellie. Both Daniel and Nellie were Irish immigrants; they originally lived on a farm in the Town of Lodi, but Byrns opened a grocery store in the city by 1913. The one-and-a-half-story house has a bungalow design, a popular choice in the 1910s; its architect and builder are unknown. The house features a screened wraparound porch, square pilasters flanking the front entrance, and a large gabled dormer with a small balcony above the entrance. It is the largest and best-preserved example of a bungalow in Lodi.

The house was added to the National Register of Historic Places in 2008.
