= Esther Byrnes =

American zoologist

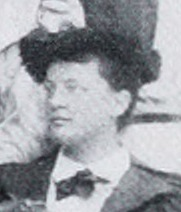
- Byrnes in 1894
- Born: 1867; Overbrook, Pennsylvania
- Died: 1946 (aged 78–79); Maine
- Citizenship: American
- Awards: Fellow of the New York Academy of Sciences
- Scientific career
- Fields: Biology

Esther Fussell Byrnes (1867–1946) was an American biologist and science teacher. She was one of the first women copepodologists—scientists who study copepods. She was a fellow of the New York Academy of Sciences, as well as the American Society of Naturalists.

== Life ==
Byrnes was born in Overbrook, Philadelphia in 1867. She graduated from Bryn Mawr College with a B.A. in 1891. For the next two years she worked in the biology department at Vassar College as an assistant. She then returned to Bryn Mawr College and obtained a master's degree in 1894, followed by a doctorate in 1898, whilst working in the college's biology department.

She left and went to teach in New York at the Girls High School, Brooklyn in their Department of Physiology and Biology until her retirement from teaching in 1932. During this time, she was a member of the New York Science Teachers Association. This was only interrupted from 1926 to 1927, when she took a year off to tutor the princesses of the Japanese royal family at Tsuda College, Tokyo.

In 1940, she became director of Mount Desert Biological Laboratory, Maine.

Her research was focused on marine biology and her work at Bryn Mawr focused on the study of limb regeneration in amphibians as well as studying cyclops, a freshwater species of crustacean.

She died in Maine while on vacation at the age of 79.

== Memberships ==
- New York Academy of Sciences (Fellow)
- Genetic Association
- New York State Science Teachers' Association
- North Central Community League of Philadelphia
- Marine Biological Association
- Society of Naturalists
- Society of Zoologists

== Works ==
- Byrnes, E. F. (1909). "The Fresh Water Cyclops of Long Island". Cold Spring Harbor Monographs. 7. doi:10.5962/bhl.title.10398. hdl:2027/uc1.31175034923915.
- Byrnes, E. F. (1921). "The Metamorphosis of Cyclops americanus Marsh and Cyclops signatus var. tenuicornis". Cold Spring Harbor Monographs. 9.
