= Tracy Byrnes =

American journalist

- Born: August 9, 1970 (age 54); New Jersey, U.S.
- Education: BA, Lehigh University, 1992 MBA, Rutgers University
- Occupation: Financial Advisor
- Employer: Lebenthal Global Advisors LLC
- Children: 3

Tracy Byrnes (born August 9, 1970) is a financial advisor and former American television business news anchor, journalist, and accountant who worked for the Fox Business Network. Byrnes appeared as a recurring panelist on Fox Business Channel stocks and investment news programs Cashin' In, Bulls & Bears and Your World with Neil Cavuto. She formerly hosted the 1 P.M. ET weekday FBN Live on FoxNews.com Live. She joined Fox Business Network as a reporter in October 2007 after being a recurring guest since 2005. She left Fox Business Network in March 2015.

In 2018, she switched careers and became a financial advisor for UBS. In 2025, she was named Vice President, Women and Investing, at Lebenthal Global Advisors.

== Early life and education ==
Byrnes, born into a Sicilian-American family, was raised in northern New Jersey and is a 1992 graduate of Lehigh University with a B.A. in economics and two English minors. After college, Byrnes embarked on a career at Ernst & Young LLP as a senior accountant. Byrnes later advanced her education with an M.B.A. in accounting from Rutgers University Graduate School of Management.

== Career as Columnist, Author ==
Byrnes began her financial journalism career in 1997. As a freelance business columnist, Byrnes has written columns for The Wall Street Journal and the New York Post. Prior to freelancing, she spent four years as a senior writer for TheStreet.com, In 2008, Byrnes released her first book, Break Down Your Money: How to Get Beyond the Noise to Profit in the Markets. In 2015, Byrnes founded WineOnTheStreet.com, a wine-focused content site.
