= Budge's Shop =

Coordinates: 50.4105°N 4.3601°W

- Location within Cornwall
- OS grid reference: SX324594
- Unitary authority: Cornwall
- Ceremonial county: Cornwall
- Region: South West
- Country: England
- Sovereign state: United Kingdom
- Post town: Saltash
- Postcode district: PL12 5
- Police: Devon and Cornwall
- Fire: Cornwall
- Ambulance: South Western

Budge's Shop is a hamlet in Cornwall, England. It is half a mile northwest of Trerulefoot. According to the Post Office the 2011 census population was included in the civil parish of St. Germans.
