= Bucklerheads =

Coordinates: 56.514746°N 2.877497°W

Bucklershead
- Location within Angus
- OS grid reference: NO461362
- Council area: Angus
- Lieutenancy area: Angus
- Country: Scotland
- Sovereign state: United Kingdom
- Post town: DUNDEE
- Postcode district: DD5
- Dialling code: 01382
- Police: Scotland
- Fire: Scottish
- Ambulance: Scottish
- UK Parliament: Dundee East
- Scottish Parliament: Angus North East Scotland

Bucklershead is a village in Angus, Scotland. It lies approximately three miles north of Monifieth, on the B978 road.
