= Norco Bicycles =

Canadian bicycle maker founded in 1964

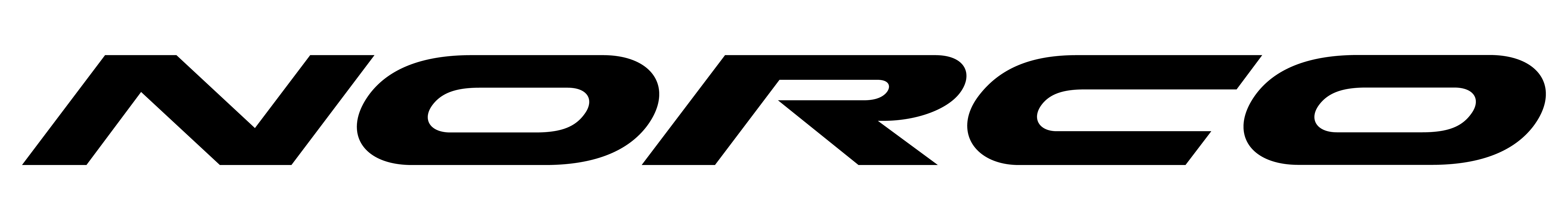
- Industry: Bicycles
- Founded: 1964
- Headquarters: Port Coquitlam, British Columbia, Canada
- Key people: Alan Lewis, Bert Lewis
- Products: Bicycle
- Website: www.norco.com

Norco Bicycles is a bicycle manufacturer founded in 1964 and headquartered in Port Coquitlam, British Columbia, Canada.

The company was founded by Bert Lewis and initially operated from a converted chicken coop in Burnaby, British Columbia. Norco was one of the first manufacturers of ten-speed bicycles, and helped popularize BMX cycling. By 2014 the company line consisted of over 125 models shipped worldwide.

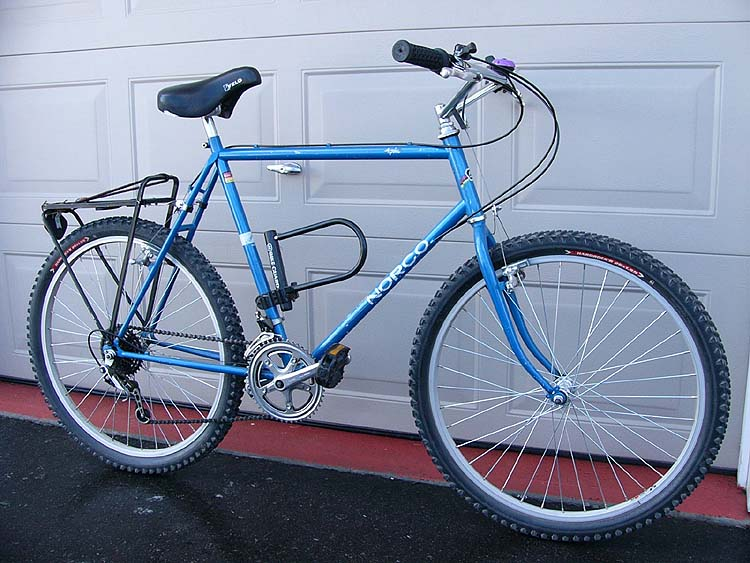
1986 model Norco Alpine mountain bike

== Norco Race Division ==
In 2025 the Norco Race Division roster includes:

- Greg Minnaar - DH Race
- Danny Hart - DH Race
- Gracey Hemstreet - DH Race
- Lucas Cruz - DH Race
- Bodhi Kuhn - DH Race
- Erice van Leuven - DH Race
- Lina Frener - DH Race (Junior)
- Kirk McDowall - DH Race (Engineer)
- Matt MacDuff - Freeride

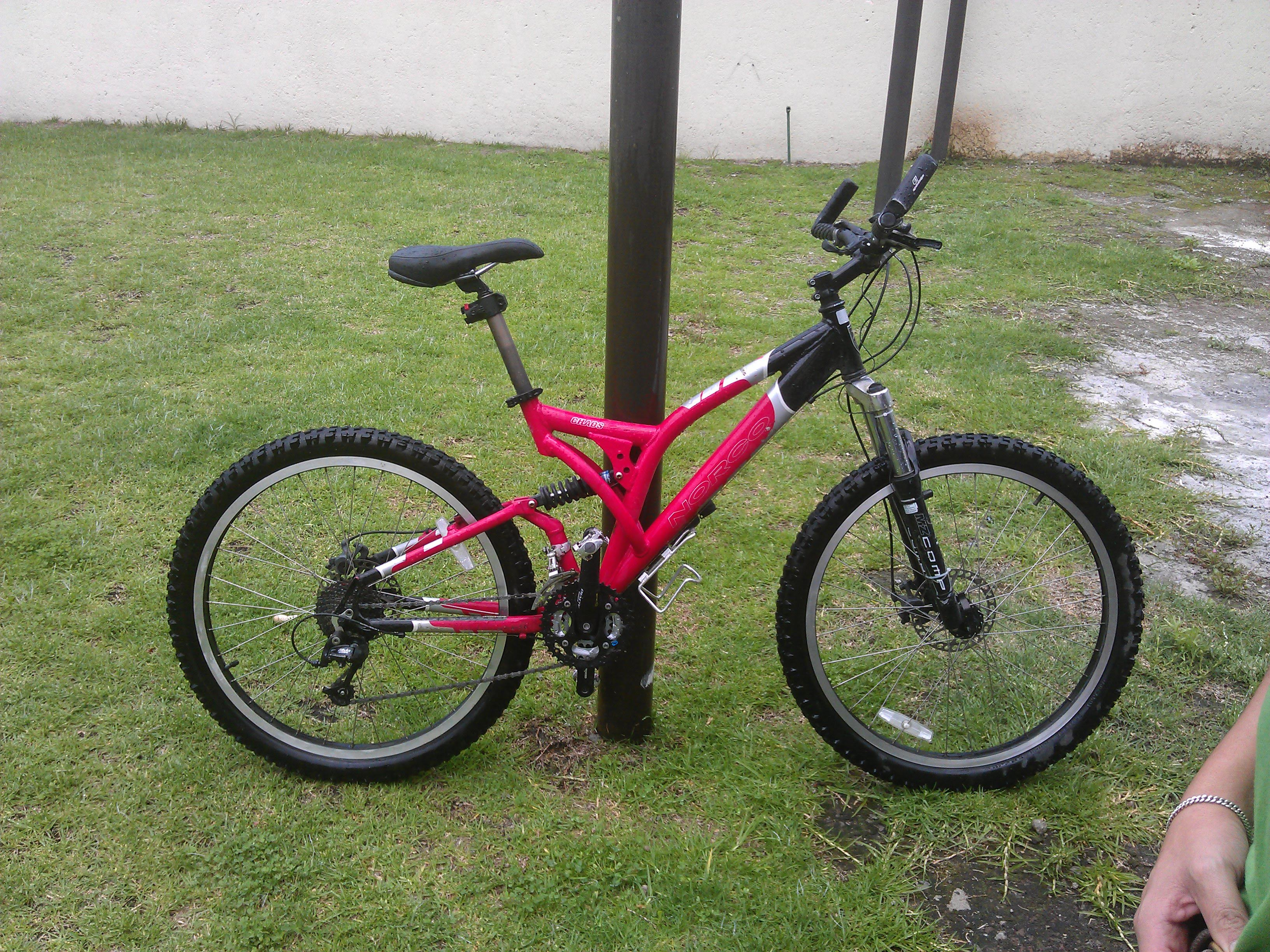
2004 model Norco Chaos

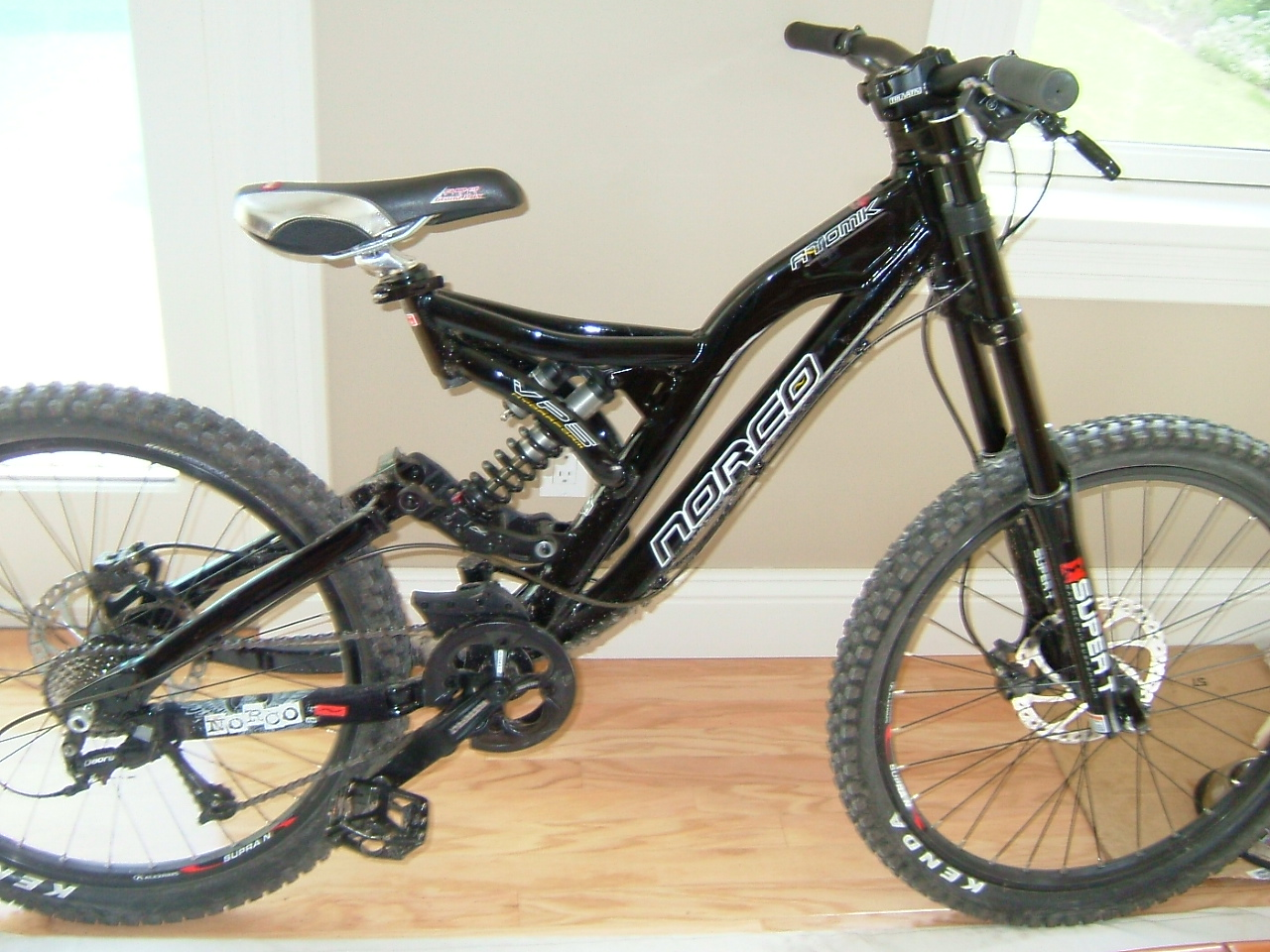
2006 model Norco Atomik

Norco old logo

=== Past riders include ===
- Sam Blenkinsop (DH)
- Bryn Atkinson - DH Race/Slalom
- Jill Kintner: DH Race/Slalom/Enduro/PT
- Emmy Lan - DH Race/Enduro
- Gwendalyn Gibson - Cross Country
- Peter Disera: Cross Country
- Jackson Goldstone
- Ryan Leech: Trials/Tech Trails
- Darcy Turenne (Freeride 2011 – 2012)
- Harry Heath (DH)
- Fraser McGlone (DH – 2016)
- Magnus Manson (DH – 2015)
- Jack Iles (DH – 2014–15)
- Sam Dueck (Slopestyle – 2011–12)
- Nick Geddes (Junior DH – 2011–12)
- Andrew Watson (XC/CX)
- Evan Guthrie (XC)
- Evan McNeely (XC/CX)
- Peter Disera (XC/CX, U23)
- Haley Smith (Elite Women’s XC)
- Cayley Brooks (U23 Women’s XC – 2014)
- Andrew Lesperance (XC)
