= Bryn Jones (footballer, born 1938) =

English footballer

Personal information
- Full name: Brian Jones
- Date of birth: 15 September 1938 (age 88)
- Place of birth: Barnsley, West Riding of Yorkshire, England
- Height: 5 ft 6 in (1.68 m)
- Position: Full-back

Senior career*
| Years | Team | Apps | (Gls) |
| 1957–1959 | Barnsley | 14 | (0) |
| 1959–1960 | York City | 1 | (0) |
| Total | | 15 | (0) |
- * Club domestic league appearances and goals

Brian "Bryn" Jones (born 15 September 1938) is an English former professional footballer who played as a full back in the Football League for Barnsley and York City.
