= Buchanan Smithy =

Coordinates: 56.0735°N 4.4692°W

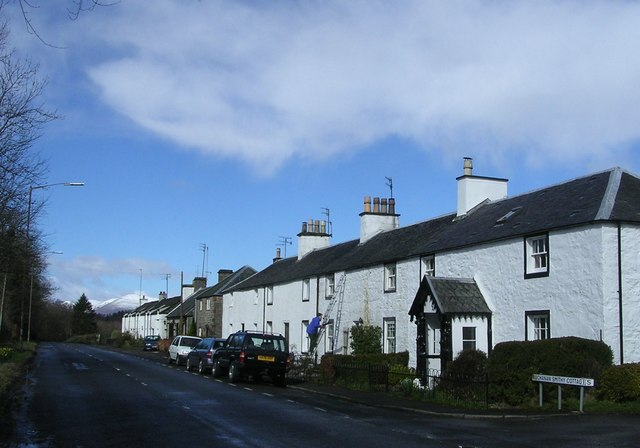
- Cottages in Buchanan Smithy

- Location within the Stirling council area
- OS grid reference: NS463894
- Civil parish: Buchanan
- Council area: Stirling
- Lieutenancy area: Stirling and Falkirk
- Country: Scotland
- Sovereign state: United Kingdom
- Post town: Glasgow
- Postcode district: G63
- Dialling code: 01360
- Police: Scotland
- Fire: Scottish
- Ambulance: Scottish
- UK Parliament: Stirling and Strathallan
- Scottish Parliament: Stirling

Buchanan Smithy is a hamlet in Buchanan in the far west of Stirling, Scotland. The settlement was mostly purpose-built in the 18th century for the estate workers of James Graham, 3rd Duke of Montrose, who lived at nearby Buchanan Castle. The name "Smithy" arose due to the presence of three blacksmiths there. Today the main local industries are forestry, agriculture and tourism.

== See also ==
- Balmaha
- Milton of Buchanan
