= Brina =

Apple cultivar

Malus domestica 'Brina'
- Hybrid parentage: 'PRI 2059-101 × ' Open pol. '
- Cultivar: 'Brina'
- Origin: Italy 1996 CRAFRU-Roma

The Brina apple is an apple cultivar that was first developed in the Italy in the 1979s by open pollination PRI 2059-101 apples.

The cultivar is resistant to scab. It has a spreading habit with intermediate vigor; full flowering season is medium-late and production is heavy. The fruit is medium or medium-large with a smooth skin, white lenticels, and no russet. It has excellent taste characteristics. Its ripening time: I decade of October, in Trentino A.A. (I).
