= Brynafan =

Village in Ceredigion, Wales

Coordinates: 52°20′21″N 3°53′36″W

- Location within Ceredigion
- OS grid reference: SN 7111 7292
  - Cardiff: 66.7 mi (107.3 km)
  - London: 170.3 mi (274.1 km)
- Community: Trawsgoed
- Principal area: Ceredigion
- Country: Wales
- Sovereign state: United Kingdom
- Post town: Aberystwyth
- Postcode district: SY23
- Police: Dyfed-Powys
- Fire: Mid and West Wales
- Ambulance: Welsh
- UK Parliament: Ceredigion Preseli
- Senedd Cymru – Welsh Parliament: Ceredigion

Brynafan is a small village in the community of Trawsgoed, Ceredigion, Wales, which is 66.7 miles (107.3 km) from Cardiff and 170.3 miles (274.1 km) from London. Brynafan is represented in the Senedd by Elin Jones (Plaid Cymru) and is part of the Ceredigion Preseli constituency in the House of Commons.

== See also ==
- List of localities in Wales by population
