= Michael J. Byrne =

Australian medical oncologist

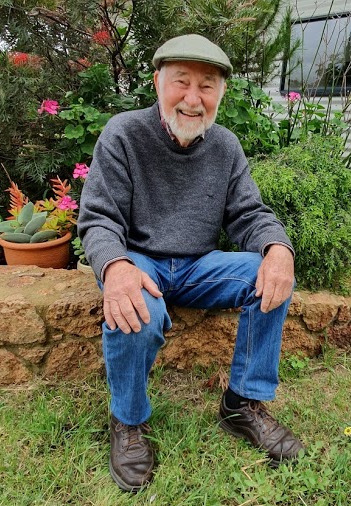

Michael Joseph John Byrne (13 May 1941 – 24 December 2020) was a professor and research clinician from Perth, who was responsible for the establishment of medical oncology in Australia.

== Education ==
Byrne, third child of Dora (née Ivey) and dentist turned publican Michael Byrne, was born in the Beaconsfield Hotel, educated by the Sisters of St. Joseph of the Apparition at what became St. Patrick's in Fremantle, later at Mary's Mount primary school in Gooseberry Hill, and from the age of eight at St. Louis in Claremont. He graduated with degrees in Medicine, Surgery, and Medical Science from the University of Western Australia (where he won a half blue in Fencing) in 1966, relocated with his family to Boston in 1968 to complete his medical training at the Lemuel Shattuck Hospital, and returned home to Western Australia in 1973.

== Professional ==
Encouraged by geriatrician Professor Richard Lefroy, Byrne in 1973 established the first department to specialise in the use of pharmaceutical drugs to treat cancer at the state's major teaching institution, Sir Charles Gairdner Hospital in Nedlands, where he replaced Dr. John Holt as head of department on his return from the United States. To that point, Radiation Oncology and Surgical Oncology had been the sole modes of treatment available in Australia.

Byrne was an active researcher in Breast Cancer and Mesothelioma, lectured at Tufts University, Brown University, and the School of Medicine and Pharmacology at the University of Western Australia, and held numerous board positions, including with the Australian and New Zealand Brest Cancer Trials Group, the Australian National Centre for Asbestos Related Diseases, and the St. John of God Hospital ethics committee. He was awarded memberships of the Royal College of Physicians, and fellowships of the Royal Australasian College of Physicians and the American Society of Clinical Oncology.

== Personal ==
Byrne was a founding and Life Member of The German Shorthaired Pointer club of Western Australia, a founding member of The Llama Society of Australia, and maintained memberships in the Llama Association of Australasia, the Australian Suffolk Association, and the International Oak Society. He was a keen competitor in retrieving and utility field trials, dog shows, llama shows and sheep shows, an International All Breeds Dog Judge, and a Field Trial judge. He loved poetry in both English and German, studied Archeology, and was a keen moviegoer and bird-watcher, whose taste in music included classical, classical guitar, Dixieland Jazz, folk and Rock.

Byrne and wife Georgina established the Burnbrook German Shorthaired Pointer kennel and bloodline, and together imported, bred, and exported dogs, llamas, and sheep, from suburban Helena Valley and later their rural property in Gidgegannup, where he died in his sleep on 24 December 2020. He is survived by his wife, three children, five grandchildren, and two great-grandchildren.
