= Brine (surname) =

This surname Brine may have the following origins. The first is that it is a variant of Bryan. The second is that it is a variant of Browne. However, other sources suggest it's from the Anglo-Saxon word bryne meaning "burning".

The surname may refer to:

- Augustus Brine (1769–1840), English naval officer
- Beverly Brine (b. 1961), Canadian politician
- Cyril Brine (1914–1988), English speedway racer
- David Brine (b. 1985), Canadian ice hockey player
- James Brine (d. 1902), one of the Tolpuddle Martyrs
- John Brine (1703–1765), English Baptist minister
- George Brine, the namesake of the George Brine House
- Salty Brine (1918–2004), Walter L. Brine Jr., American broadcaster
- Steve Brine (b. 1974), British politician
