= Leonie Byrnes =

Australian teacher and school inspector

Victoria Leonie (Pat) Byrnes (born Victoria Leoni Palazzi) (2 April 1888 – 12 May 1964) was an Australian school teacher and inspector. In 1956, long financially independent, she was installed as the honorary 'Mistress of Method' to the novices' teacher-training schools at Lochinvar and Singleton convents.

== Also known as ==
- Byrnes, Pat (1888–1964)
- Byrnes, Victoria Leonie (1888–1964)
- Palazzi, Victoria Leonie (1888–1964)
- Palazzi, V. L. (Victoria Leonie) (1888–1964)

== Personal life ==
Born near Wagga Wagga, New South Wales, third daughter and tenth of eleven children of Swiss-born parents Jean-Baptiste Palazzi, railway-ganger, and his wife Assunta, née Delponte. Miss Palazzi was married to John Joseph Byrnes and lived in Newcastle for many years; in later times she resided in Fairlight Street, Manly.

== Legacy and impact ==
Palazzi joined the Department of Public Instruction in July 1907 as a pupil-teacher at Enmore Public School, Sydney, and completed training in 1909. While teaching (1910–15) in primary schools, she attended (part-time) the University of Sydney (B.A., 1913) and in 1916–19 taught in turn at Goulburn and at St George Girls' high schools.

In 1936 she edited The Roma Poetry Book, a much-reprinted anthology for school children which is still available in New South Wales State Library and University of Sydney library today.
