= Bryn Law =

Welsh football commentator

Bryn Law (born 23 June 1969) is a Welsh football commentator who works for Leeds United's LUTV, company owner, author and producer. Law commentated for Sky Sports and has 25 years of broadcasting experience.

== Education ==
Having been born in Wales, Law speaks fluent Welsh. He was the only person to study the subject at A-level at his educational facility.

For his undergraduate degree (1987–1991), Law went to the University of London and Royal Central School of Speech and Drama to study English and Drama, achieving an upper-second. Following this, he attended the University of Central Lancashire, studying postgraduate journalism (1991–1992). Here he met TV presenter Adrian Chiles.

== Commentating ==
According to Law's LinkedIn: "Regional reporter for Yorkshire, Wales' national team reporter, Soccer Saturday reporter, Sky Sports' touchline reporter. Previously commentator covering EPL, Wales, women's football, even beach football!"

On 25 July 2019 it was announced via Twitter that Law would be taking on the role of head commentator for LUTV at Leeds United, replacing Michael Weadock who had worked in the role for 13 years.

== Business ventures ==
Law owns two companies, Tagg Media, a media training company and Oddjob Promotions, a music promotion service.

His two books, Zombie Nation Awakes and Don't Take Me Home, are about the build-up to and his experience at the 2016 European Championships. His writings were so popular that he participated in book signings in Wales as a tribute to his friend Gary Speed. He reports Wales' emotional journey to qualifying for the Euros.

Law was president of the Wrexham AFC Supporters Trust but resigned from this post in January 2017.

== Personal life ==
Law is father to two daughters, is married and has a dog named Biff. He lives in Leeds with his family.
