= Bufton =

Small hamlet in England

Coordinates: 52.649°N 1.409°W

Bufton is a small hamlet in England between the Leicestershire villages of Carlton and Barton in the Beans. It has around 10–15 residents, mainly on farms.
