= Michael Burns (Tennessee politician) =

Irish-born American politician

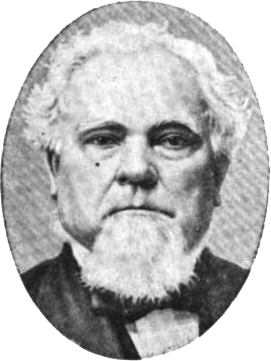
- Born: March 1813; County Sligo, Ireland
- Died: July 14, 1896 (aged 83); Nashville, Tennessee, U.S.
- Occupations: Banker, businessman, politician
- Political party: Democratic Party
- Spouse: Margaret Gilliam
- Parent(s): Patrick Burns; Catharine Clark

Michael Burns (March 1813 – July 14, 1896) was an Irish-born American saddler, businessman and politician. He served as a director of several banks in Tennessee, as well as the president of the Nashville and Northwestern Railroad and the Nashville and Chattanooga Railroad in the 1850s and 1860s. After the American Civil War, he served as the president of the First National Bank of Nashville from 1870 to 1878, and as a member of the Tennessee Senate from 1883 to 1885 and from 1889 to 1891, representing Davidson County.

== Early life ==
Michael Burns was born in March 1813 in County Sligo, Ireland. His father was Patrick Burns and his mother, Catharine Clark. He became an orphan when his father died when he was 9 and his mother died when he was 15.

== Career ==
Burns was apprenticed as a saddler. He emigrated to Canada in 1831, settling in Montreal. He emigrated to the United States, first working as a saddler in New Haven, Connecticut; New York City; and Pittsburgh, Pennsylvania. He settled in Nashville, Tennessee, in 1836. Burns worked as a saddler in Nashville, spent two years in Jefferson, Tennessee (located in Rutherford County, Tennessee), from 1837 to 1839, and returned again to Nashville. He made and sold saddles and other leather products.

Burns served on the board of directors of the Nashville and Northwestern Railroad from 1853 to 1868. He served as its vice president from 1861–64, and as its president from 1864 to 1868. He also served as the president of the Nashville and Chattanooga Railroad. Meanwhile, he served on the board of directors of the Bank of Tennessee from 1853 to 1859. He then served on the board of directors of the Union Bank of Tennessee from 1859 to 1865. In 1878, he joined the board of directors of the Third National Bank of Nashville and the American National Bank of Nashville. He also served on the board of directors of the Nashville Commercial Insurance Company for two decades. He served as the president of the First National Bank of Nashville from 1870 to 1878.

Burns remained neutral during the American Civil War of 1861–1865. However, Burns's Artillery of the Confederate States Army was named in his honor. However, he was opposed to secession. Although he supported the Union Army, he assisted the CSA. Burns was a personal friend of Andrew Johnson, who served as 17th President of the United States from 1865 to 1868. Burns was a member of the Democratic Party. He served two terms as a member of the Tennessee Senate from 1883 to 1885 and again from 1889 to 1891, representing Davidson County, Tennessee.

== Personal life andeath ==
Burns married Margaret Gilliam on March 14, 1842; she died in 1885. He was a Roman Catholic. Burns died on July 14, 1896, in Nashville, Tennessee. He was interred at Calvary Cemetery in Nashville.
