= Bryn Evans =

Bryn Evans may refer to:

- Bryn Evans (rugby league) (1899–1975), English rugby league player
- Bryn Evans (rugby union, born 1902), Welsh rugby union player
- Bryn Evans (rugby union, born 1906) (1906–1978), Welsh international rugby union player
- Bryn Evans (rugby union, born 1984), New Zealand rugby union player
