= Trencrom =

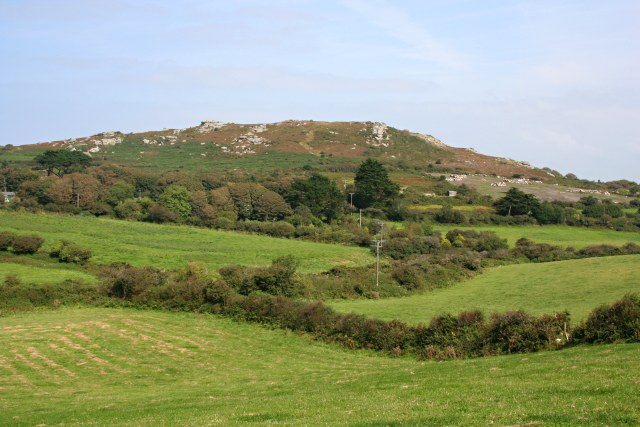
Trencrom Hill

Trencrom is a hamlet south of St Ives, Cornwall, England, United Kingdom.

== See also ==
- Trencrom Hill
