= Pediatric Pulmonology =

- Discipline: Pediatrics, pulmonology
- Language: English
- Edited by: Susanna McColley

Publication details
- History: 1985-present
- Publisher: John Wiley & Sons
- Impact factor: 3.039 (2020)

Standard abbreviations
- ISO 4: Pediatr. Pulmonol.

Indexing
- CODEN: PEPUES
- ISSN: 8755-6863 (print); 1099-0496 (web)
- OCLC no.: 11383709

Links
- Journal homepage; Online access; Online archive

Pediatric Pulmonology is a monthly peer-reviewed medical journal covering pediatric pulmonology. It was established in 1985; the editor-in-chief is Susanna McColley, MD. According to the Journal Citation Reports, the journal has a 2020 impact factor of 3.039, ranking it 36th out of 129 journals in the category "Pediatrics" and 36th out of 64 in the category "Respiratory System".
