= Bryn Atkinson =

Australian professional mountain bike racing cyclist

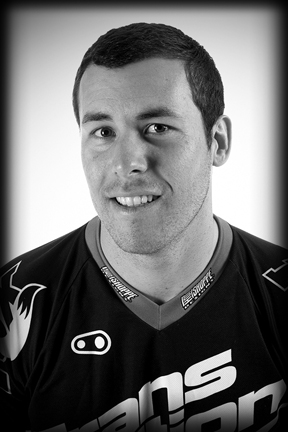
- Bryn Atkinson portrait

Personal information
- Full name: Bryn Atkinson
- Born: 9 December 1982 (age 43) Canberra, Australia
- Height: 178 cm (5 ft 10 in)
- Weight: 90 kg (198 lb)

Cycling career
- Sport: Cycling
- Discipline: Profesional MTB
- Role: Rider
- Rider type: Downhill/ Trail

Amateur team
- ?: St George CC

Professional teams
- 2002-Present: Royal/Orange
- ?: Madcatz/Ironhorse
- ?: GT Bicycles
- ?: Intense/Crankbros
- ?-2010: Transition Racing
- ?-2022: Norco Factory Team

Bryn Atkinson (born 9 December 1982, Canberra, Australian Capital Territory) is an Australian professional mountain bike racing cyclist from Townsville, QLD. He started mountain biking in 1996 and became a professional in 2002. Bryn's first introduction to the sport was through his local mountain bike club in Townsville- The Townsville Rockwheelers. Competing in several cross country type events, Bryn evolved with the sport and later found downhill. As a teenager, he moved north to Cairns, a popular location for downhill mountain biking, and host of the UCI Mountain Bike World Championships in 1996. Glen Jacobs was the course builder for that event and several other events on the World Cup, and mentored Bryn and several other downhillers in the area.

The first Australian competitors to travel overseas and race world cups with success were Michael Ronning, Scott Sharples, Sean Mccarroll, Tai Lee Muxlow, Katrina Miller, Wade Boots, etc.. Scott Sharples would later become Bryn's coach.

Royal/ Orange was the first international Downhill team Bryn raced for in 2002. In 2003, as a member of yet another Aussie Invasion, he joined Rennie, Hill and Graves on the MadCatz/Iron Horse team. In 2005 Bryn signed with GT Bicycles for four years. In 2009 he and his girlfriend (now Wife), Jill Kintner formed a privateer program with Crankbrothers and Intense Bicycles. In 2010-11 he rode for Transition Bicycles out of Ferndale, Wa, and is teammates with Jill Kintner, and Lars Sternberg.

Since retiring from full-time racing, Bryn has done filming and photography.

He currently resides in Bellingham, Washington.

== Palmarès ==
2002
7th DH, Australian National Mountain Biking Championships

2003
4th DH, Australian National Mountain Biking Championships
9th 4X, Norba Series, Round 4 USA
10th DH, Oceania MTB Championships AUS
10th DH, Norba Series, Round 5 USA

2004
6th 4X, Norba Series, Round 3 USA
8th DH, Norba Series, Round 3 USA
5th DH, Norba Series, Round 5 USA
9th DH, Norba Series, Round 6 USA
4th DH, Norba Series, Round 7 USA
10th 4X, Norba Series, Round 7 USA
8th DH, Norba Series Final USA

2005
4th 4X, Sea Otter
2nd Pro Slalom, Sea Otter
10th DH, Sea Otter
3rd 4X, Norba Series, Round 5 USA
6th DH, National Series Final VIC
7th DH, UCI Mountain Bike & Trials World Championships, ITA
9th DH, MTB World Cup CAN

2006
2nd DH, Australian National Mountain Biking Championships

7th DH MTB World Cup, Round 5 BRA

13th DH MTB World Championships Rotorua, New Zealand

2007
1st US Open
3rd 4X Oceania Championships ACT
4th DH Oceania Championships AUS
9th 4X MTB World Cup, Round 2 SUI

2008
3rd US Open
9th DH MTB World Cup, Round 6, Canberra, Australia
2nd DH, Australian National Mountain Biking Championships

2009
8th UCI World Cup Val nord, Andorra

2010
2nd DH National Thredbo, NSW
1st Pro Gravity Tour #1 Port Angeles, WA
12th UCI World Cup #1, Maribor, Slovenia
2nd Pro Gravity Tour #2 Platekill, NY
16th UCI World Cup Ft. William, Scotland
2nd Pro GRT #3 Northstar Tahoe, CA
20th UCI World Cup Champery, SUI
18th UCI World Cup Val Di Sole, ITA
1st Overall Pro Gravity Tour Series
21st Overall UCI World Cup Series
1st Newtons Nation Bathurst, AUS

2011
1st DH Mt. Buller, AUS MTB Series
4th DH, Australian National Mountain Biking Championships

2012
7th DH, Australian National Mountain Biking Championships
