= Brin =

Brin may refer to:

== People ==
- Benedetto Brin (1833–1898), Italian naval administrator and politician
- David Brin (born 1950), American science fiction author
- Davis Brin (born 2000), American football player
- Irene Brin (1911–1969), Italian fashion journalist, writer and art dealer
- Romeo Brin (born 1973), Filipino retired amateur boxer
- Sergey Brin (born 1973), American businessman and co-founder of Google

== Other uses ==
- Brin-class submarine, a 1930s Royal Italian Navy class
  - Brin, an Italian submarine active during World War II
- Brin (Genoa Metro), a railway station in Genoa, Italy
- Michael Brin Prize in Dynamical Systems or Brin Prize, a mathematics award
- Block Range Index (BRIN), a database indexing technique
- Brin Londo, DC Comics character also known as Timber Wolf
- River Brin, a small tributary of the River Nairn, Scottish Highlands, United Kingdom
- Brin, a fibroin filament and component of silk
- BRIN, abbreviation for Badan Riset dan Inovasi Nasional (National Research and Innovation Agency)

== See also ==
- Brin's Oxygen Company (1886–1905), original name of the industrial gas company BOC
  - Brin process, a chemical process used to produce oxygen
- Bryn (disambiguation)
