= Brine (brand) =

American sporting goods manufacturer

- Company type: Subsidiary
- Industry: Sporting goods
- Founded: 1922 as the W.H. Brine Company
- Founder: W.H. Brine
- Headquarters: Milford, Massachusetts
- Products: Footwear, Apparel, Sports equipment
- Number of employees: 87
- Parent: New Balance
- Website: brine.com

Brine is an American sporting goods company that manufactures lacrosse, soccer, volleyball, and field hockey equipment. It markets its products under its own brand as well as In The Crease for goals and goal accessories. The company was founded by W.H. Brine in 1922 as the W.H. Brine Company. It was privately owned by the Brine family and named Brine, Inc. before it was acquired by New Balance on August 4, 2006.

== History ==
=== Foundation ===
Brine was founded in 1922 by W.H. Brine as the W.H. Brine Company. It started as a small sports equipment and uniform company. They sold to private schools and regional camps, quickly growing to a major manufacturer of lacrosse and soccer equipment. The Brines the founder's family have been sports goods vendors first as retailers since 1867. James F. Brine's founded in 1867 in Cambridge, Massachusetts is currently located in Concord, Massachusetts.

=== 1950s ===
During the 1950s Brine focused on lacrosse. Lacrosse sticks were all wooden at the time and the only company producing them was Chisholm Lacrosse which was located on the St. Regis Reservation, Cornwall Island, Canada. With the encouragement and assistance from A. MacDonald Murphy of Governor Dummer Academy, Ferris Thomsen, coach of Penn and Princeton and Mort LaPointe of Bowdoin College, the Brine family began to explore the possibilities of manufacturing lacrosse sticks.

=== 1960s ===
Brine started to manufacture soccer balls and equipment in the 1960s. It was the first company to cover the ball with synthetic leather to make it more durable. It was also the first to make a perfectly round bladder and the first to unconditionally guarantee a ball.

=== 1970s ===
Attempting to make a lacrosse stick that was durable and easy to make, the Brine family experimented with laminated wood, plastic, fiberglass and aluminum but could not find a material that met the performance standards. They continued to experiment and eventually found Surlyn, a DuPont plastic, to have the necessary properties to survive the intensity of lacrosse. Brine then developed a molding technique that was the basic draft shape of the standard in modern sticks.

=== Cascade ===
In 1986 Bill Brine left the family's company and founded Cascade, now the largest lacrosse helmet and eyewear company in the world.

=== Recent years ===
Brine started an apparel line and a line of volleyball equipment in the 1990s. In 2000, it released a full line of field hockey equipment. Brine began to make lacrosse helmets and eyemasks in 2003. Also in 2003, Brine acquired In The Crease, a lacrosse goal and accessories company based in Penn Yan, New York and in 2004 it began making athletic footwear. On August 4, 2006, New Balance acquired Brine and shortly after that the name was changed to Brine, Corp. from Brine, Inc.

== Video Game ==
In 2005, they released the first mobile lacrosse video game, titled Brine Lacrosse.
