= Bryn Taylor =

American fashion stylist (born 1980)

Bryn Taylor (née Tripucka; born August 26, 1980), is an American fashion stylist and founder of The Re-Stylist. Originally based in New York, The Re-Stylist became a bicoastal business in December 2011, when Taylor moved to San Francisco.

== Early life ==
Taylor was born in Glen Ridge, New Jersey and is the granddaughter of Frank Tripucka and the niece of Kelly Tripucka. She studied theatre at Northwestern University in Chicago before moving back to the east coast.

== Career ==
Taylor started her fashion career as a fit model for Holly Kristen in New York. She then spent two years in merchandising and product development at Phillips-Van Heusen before becoming an editor at SheFinds. She simultaneously began freelance editorial styling with Bryn Taylor Made. After leaving SheFinds, Taylor contributed articles to a number of fashion blogs and founded her personal styling business, The Re-Stylist.

== Reception ==
A number of articles have been written about Taylor's styling, as referenced below.

- Bender, Rachel Grumman (September 6, 2011). "Restyle Your Wardrobe—Without Spending a Dime!". Dr. Oz's You Beauty.
- Martin, Adrienne Johnson (May 26, 2011). "Got you covered". The Charlotte Observer.
- "Hangers On". Executive Moms. May 5, 2011.
