= Brine Lacrosse =

2005 video game

- Title page
- Developer(s): SkyZone Entertainment
- Publisher(s): SkyZone Entertainment
- Platform(s): Mobile phone
- Release: NA: Mid 2005
- Genre(s): Sports
- Mode(s): Single player

Brine Lacrosse (sometimes also called Brine LAX) is a lacrosse mobile game.

== Development ==
It is the first lacrosse game ever made for mobile phones and the second ever lacrosse video game on any platform (the first being Blast Lacrosse). It was developed and published by SkyZone Entertainment and presented by Brine, Corp. It is currently available for AT&T, Sprint, Cincinnati Bell and T-Mobile. The game is not based on any real-life leagues or teams but instead features teams named after regions in the United States. It features in-game advertising for Brine, Corp.

== Gameplay ==
The gameplay is a side-perspective of a field lacrosse game. Players can run, pass shoot, and even get into fights. The game follows all of the basic rules of lacrosse and is made in a realistic fashion. Players can level up from backyard to high school to college to pro by scoring 50 goals at the level.

The game is advertised as "Brine Lacrosse featuring Mikey Powell". Powell is featured on the title screen, however in-game there is no way to differentiate between the players.

== Teams ==
- Upstate (Upstate New York)
- The Island (Long Island)
- New England
- Mid West
- West Coast
- B'More (Baltimore, Maryland)

== Reception ==
Lax All Stars said the game is “a welcome addition to the lives of lacrosse players” and says the gameplay is very simple.

== See also ==
- Blast Lacrosse
