= Michael Byrnes (writer) =

American author

Michael J. Byrnes is an American author of archeological thrillers. He attended Montclair State University, and received a graduate degree in business administration from Rutgers University.

His first novel was The Sacred Bones (2007), held in 797 libraries and translated into ten languages. Since then he has written two more novels.

== Publications ==
- The Sacred Bones (2007) ISBN 9780061146077
  - French translation, Le secret du dixième tombeau ISBN 9782714443502
  - Dutch translation, Het volmaakte relikwie ISBN 978 90 245 6132 2
  - Czech translation, Tajemství Chrámové hory : skrývá starověký nález – ostatky Ježíše Krista? ISBN 9788072174799
  - Serbian translation Svete mošti ISBN 9788674368343
  - Russian translation, Святая тайна ISBN 9785699368921
  - Romanian translation "Secretul lui Iosif
  - Polish translation, Świete kości ISBN 9788375080360
  - Portuguese translation, Ossos Sagrados ISBN 9789722033152
  - Thai translation, ความลับจากโครงกระดูก ISBN 9786167010267
  - Chinese translation 聖血密碼 ISBN 9789868614116
  - Turkish translation Kutsal kemikler ISBN 9786055943547
- The Sacred Blood, (2008) ISBN 9780061340697 (a sequel to The Sacred Bones)
  - Czech translation, Tajemství svaté krve ISBN 9788072176908
- The Genesis Plague (2010) ISBN 9781847372390
  - Czech translation, Tajemství morové jeskyně ISBN 9788072178339
