= Bryn, Akershus =

Bryn
- Village
- Interactive map of Bryn
- Coordinates: 59°55′13″N 10°29′22″E
- Time zone: UTC+01:00 (CET)

Bryn is a district in the municipality of Bærum, Norway. Together with the district Hammerbakken, its population (2007) is 5,680.
