= Brinn =

Brinn is both a surname and a given name. Notable people with the name include:

- Andrew Brinn (1829–?), Scottish Union Navy officer
- Joseph Brinn, American basketball player and coach
- Sion Brinn (born 1973), Jamaican-born British swimmer
- Brinn Bevan (born 1997), British artistic gymnast
