= Bryne (disambiguation) =

Bryne may refer to:

== Places ==
- Bryne, a town in Time municipality in Rogaland county, Norway
  - Bryne F.K., a football club in the town of Bryne
  - Bryne Stadion, a stadium in the town of Bryne
  - Bryne Church, a church in the town of Bryne

== People ==
- Albertus Bryne, English organist and composer
- Barbara Bryne, American actress
- Gareth Bryne, fictional character in Robert Jordan's Wheel of Time fantasy series

== Companies ==
- Bryna Productions, also known as Brynaprod and The Bryna Company; a film production company formed by actor Kirk Douglas and named after his mother Bryna Demsky

== See also ==
- Bryn (disambiguation)
- Bryna (disambiguation)
- Brynn (disambiguation)
- Byrne
