= Byrne =

Byrne is an Irish surname and less commonly a given name. It is derived from the Gaelic Ó Broin or Ó Beirn, which are also linked to the surname O'Byrne.

There are two Irish surnames which have Byrne as their English spelling; the most common comes from Ó Broin, which refers to the Leinster-based family of Bran as described below. The less common family name is Ó Beirn or Ó Beirne, which comes from a different family and is most commonly found in the Northwest of Ireland.

== Notable people with the surname ==
=== A–D ===
- Alan Byrne (disambiguation), several people
- Alexandra Byrne, British costume designer
- Alex Byrne (disambiguation), several people
- Alfie Byrne, Lord Mayor of Dublin and TD
- Allie Byrne, British actress
- Andrea Byrne, who was a cast member on the Canadian sketch comedy TV series You Can't Do That on Television
- Andrew Byrne, first Catholic Bishop of Little Rock
- Andrew Hozier-Byrne, better known under his stage name Hozier (born 1990), Irish singer and songwriter
- Anthony Byrne (disambiguation), several people
- Bill Byrne (disambiguation), several people
- Billy Byrne (disambiguation), several people
- Bob Byrne, Irish comics writer
- Bradley Byrne (born 1965), American business attorney and politician
- Brendan Byrne, Governor of New Jersey from 1974 to 1982
- Brian Byrne, Canadian musician
- Bryan Byrne (footballer), Irish footballer
- Caroline Byrne (1970–1995), Australian model, subject of a murder case
- Catherine Byrne (disambiguation), several people
- Celine Byrne (born 1980), Irish opera soprano
- Charles Byrne (disambiguation), several people
- Charlie Byrne (disambiguation), several people
- Christopher Byrne (disambiguation), several people named Chris or Christopher
- Cliff Byrne, Irish footballer
- Conan Byrne, Irish footballer
- Condon Byrne, Australian politician
- Connor Byrne (born 1964), Irish actor
- Conor Byrne (died 1948), Irish politician and medical practitioner
- Damien Byrne (1954–2026), Irish footballer
- Damien Byrne (Gaelic footballer) (born 1978), Irish Gaelic footballer
- Danny Byrne, English footballer
- David Byrne (born 1952), American musician
- David Byrne (disambiguation), several people
- Dean Byrne (disambiguation), several people
- Debra Byrne, Australian singer
- Declan Byrne, fictional character in British soap opera Family Affairs
- Darcy Byrne, Australian local politician
- Denis Byrne, Irish sportsman
- Dominic Byrne, British newsreader and presenter
- Donald Byrne, American chess player
- Donn Byrne, Irish novelist
- Doris I. Byrne (1905–1975), New York politician and judge

=== E–J ===
- Edward Byrne (disambiguation), several people
- Emma Byrne, Irish footballer
- Emma Byrne (author), British author
- Emmet Byrne, US Representative from Illinois
- Eoin Ó Broin, Irish politician
- Noisestorm (real name Eoin Ó Broin), musician
- Eric Byrne, Irish politician
- Eugene Byrne, English writer
- Francis Byrne (politician) (1877–1938), Liberal member of the Legislative Assembly of Quebec
- Francis John Byrne, Irish historian
- Frank Byrne (Australian politician) (1837–1923), Member of the New South Wales Legislative Assembly
- Frank Byrne (Irish nationalist), instigator of the Irish National Invincibles
- Frank M. Byrne, eighth governor of South Dakota
- Gabriel Byrne (born 1950), Irish actor
- Gay Byrne (1934–2019), Irish broadcaster
- George Byrne (1892–1973), English cricketer
- Gerry Byrne (disambiguation), several people
- Greg Byrne (athletic_director), University of Alabama athletic director
- Gonçalo Byrne (born 1941), Portuguese architect
- Henry Byrne (disambiguation), several people
- Hollis Byrne, Irish rapper/ singer
- Hugh Byrne (disambiguation), several people
- Jack Byrne (1920s footballer), Irish footballer
- Jack Byrne (born 1996), Irish footballer
- James Byrne (disambiguation), several people
- Jane Byrne (1933–2014), mayor of Chicago, Illinois
- Jason Byrne (disambiguation), several people
- Jennifer Byrne (born 1955), Australian journalist
- Jenny Byrne (born 1967), Australian tennis player
- John Byrne (disambiguation), several people named John or Johnny
- Joseph Byrne (disambiguation), several people named Joe or Joseph
- Julie Byrne, American musician
- Joanna Byrne, Irish politician
- Josh Byrne (born 1996), Canadian lacrosse player

=== K–Z ===
- Kathy Byrne (1957–2024), American lawyer
- Kevin P. Byrne, United States Navy admiral
- Kurtis Byrne, Irish professional association football player
- Lee Byrne, Welsh rugby player
- Leo Christopher Byrne, American Roman Catholic archbishop
- Leslie Byrne, US Congresswoman from the state of Virginia
- Liam Byrne, British politician
- Liam Byrne (rugby league), Irish international rugby league footballer
- Liam Byrne (Irish criminal) (born 1980), Irish gangster and criminal
- Mairéad Byrne, Irish poet
- Margaret Byrne, Australian scientist
- Margaret Mary Byrne (born 1949), American politician
- Mark Byrne, Irish football player
- Martha Byrne, American actress
- Mary Byrne (disambiguation), several people
- Matt Byrne (born 1974), British Paralympic wheelchair basketball player
- Matt Byrne, drummer of the American band Hatebreed
- Michael Byrne (disambiguation), several people
- Myles Byrne, a leader in the Irish rebellion of 1798
- Neil Byrne, Irish singer in the group Celtic Thunder
- Nicky Byrne, member of Irish boy band Westlife
- Oliver Byrne (football chairman) (1944–2007), CEO of Irish soccer club Shelbourne F.C.
- Oliver Byrne (mathematician) (1810–1880), Irish civil engineer and author
- P.J. Byrne, American actor
- Pat Byrne (footballer), Irish football player and manager
- Patricia M. Byrne (1925–2007), American diplomat
- Patrick Byrne (disambiguation), several people
- Patsy Byrne, English actress
- Paul Byrne (disambiguation), several people
- Paula Byrne, British author
- Peter Byrne (disambiguation), several people
- Richie Byrne, Irish footballer
- Robert Byrne (disambiguation), several people
- Roger Byrne, English footballer
- Rose Byrne, Australian actress
- Rosemary Byrne, Member of the Scottish parliament
- Rory Byrne, South African car designer
- Sam Byrne (footballer), Irish footballer
- Sean Byrne (disambiguation), several people
- Shane Byrne (disambiguation), several people
- Shaun Byrne (disambiguation), several people
- Shay Byrne, Irish radio host
- Sophie Byrne, Australian filmmaker
- Stephen Byrne (disambiguation), several people
- Steve Byrne, American comedian and actor
- Suzy Byrne, Irish LGBT+ and disability rights activist, broadcaster, and writer
- Terry Byrne, English football manager
- Thomas Byrne (disambiguation), several people
- Todd Byrne, Australian rugby player
- Tommy Byrne (disambiguation), several people
- Tony Byrne (disambiguation), Irish boxer
- Walter Byrne (1849–1931), professional baseball umpire in 1882, see List of Major League Baseball umpires (A–F)
- William Byrne (disambiguation), several people

== Notable people with the given name ==
- Byrne Offutt, American actor
- Byrne Piven (1929–2002), American actor

== See also ==
- Byrne: A Novel by Anthony Burgess
- Byrne Dairy, based in New York
- Byrnes (disambiguation)
- Bryne (disambiguation)
- Irish nobility
