= O'Byrne =

O'Byrne may refer to:

- O'Byrne family, an Irish clan
- O'Byrne (surname), including a list of people with the name

== See also ==
- Byrne
- O'Beirne
