= Kevin Byrne =

Kevin Byrne may refer to:

- Kevin Byrne (mayor) (1949–2023), mayor of Cairns, Queensland, Australia
- Kevin Byrne (New York politician) (born 1984), member of the New York State Assembly
- Kevin P. Byrne, United States Navy officer
- Kevin Byrne (educator) (1931–2014), Irish educator
