= Aghavannagh =

Village in County Wicklow, Ireland

Aghavannagh Achadh Mheánach
- Village

Irish transcription(s)
  - Derivation: Aughavanna, Revells
  - Meaning: "Hilly field"
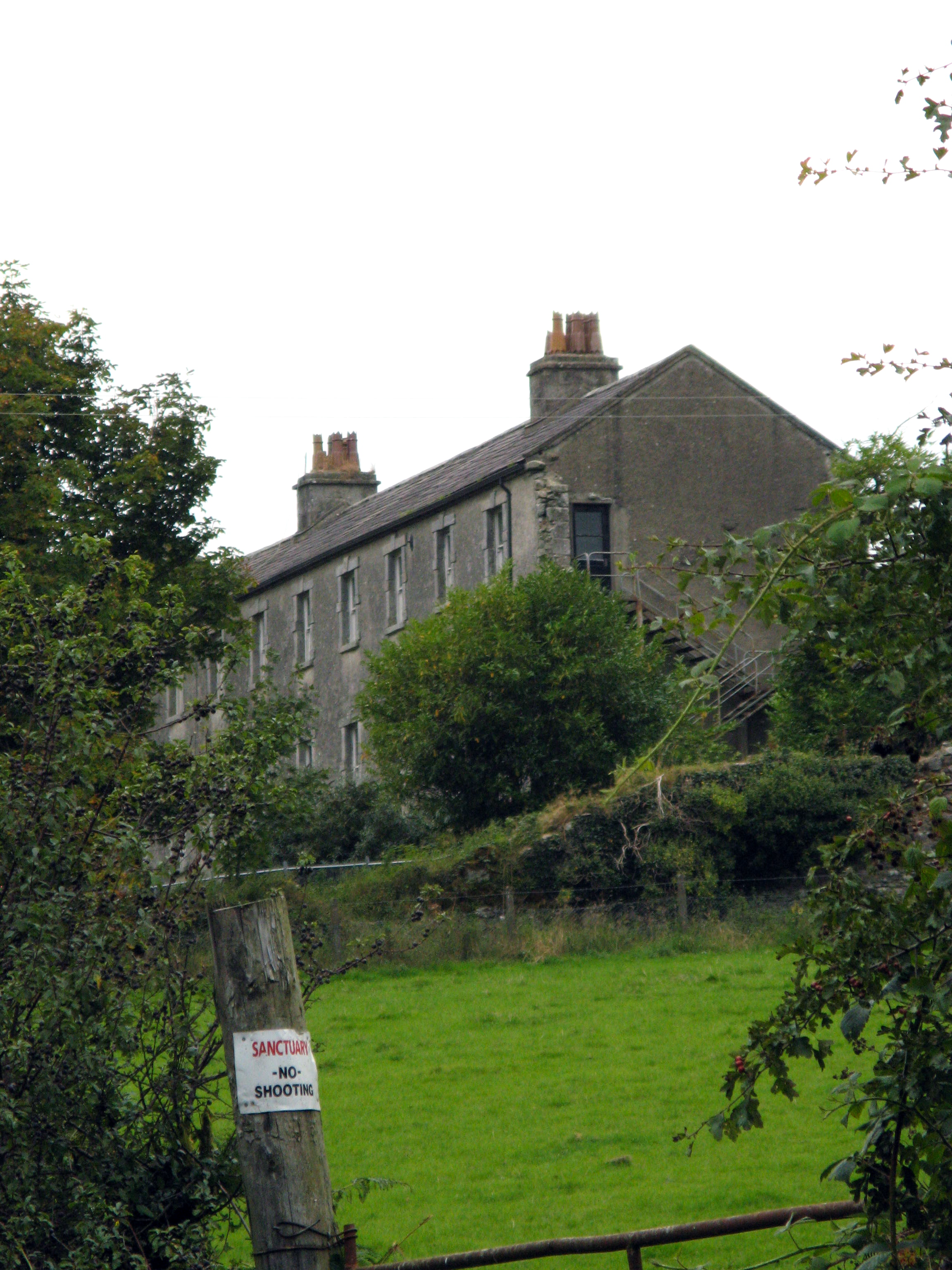
- Former military barracks, youth hostel at Aghavannagh

- Aghavannagh shown within Ireland
- Coordinates: 52°54′55″N 6°25′28″W
- Country: Ireland
- County: County Wicklow
- Barony: Ballinacor South

Area
  - Total: 1,119.72 ha (2,766.9 acres)
- Irish grid ref: T 03468 89452

Aghavannagh (Irish: Achadh Mheánach, meaning 'hilly field') is a small village and townland in south County Wicklow, Ireland. It is located in the barony of Ballinacor South on the Military Road originally constructed between 1804 and 1809, in the wake of the 1798 rebellion. Due to its remoteness, inhabitants say that "Aghavannagh is the last place God made".

== Location ==
The village is situated near the base of the Lugnaquilla massif, the highest mountain in eastern Ireland, and within a few miles of Aughrim, Glenmalure and Tinahely to the east and south, and Kiltegan, Hacketstown and Baltinglass to the west. The area is mainly surrounded by forests and is composed of mountains and mountain land. This fact may indicate an original name in Irish as achadh mbeannach whose meaning is "hilly field". This mountainous terrain is where the Ow river rises on the southern slopes of Lugnaquilla, flows through a glacial valley and passes the outskirts of the village meeting the Aghavannagh river, which is much smaller and flows through the village, a short distance to the south.

One of the earliest references to the place is in 1623 to "Aghavanny" in the Calendar of Patent Rolls of James I, followed by five other 17th century references with three different spellings of "Aghamanagh", "Aghamannagh" "Aghavannagh", and lastly "Aghavanagh" on A.R. Neville's Map of County Wicklow dated c 1810.

There is no commercial centre to the village that only comprises residences and a school (on map— no longer in use). Between 1896 and 1899 a sub-post office was opened in Aghavannagh under the nearby post town of Aughrim but this was already closed by 1909.

== Military barracks ==
Aghavannagh Barracks, along with similar structures in Glencree, Laragh and Glenmalure, was one of a series of barracks built along the route of the military road, to house British forces and give them access to the Wicklow Mountains where many 1798 rebels, such as Michael Dwyer, sought refuge. The barracks each accommodated 100 men, while a larger 200-man barracks was built in the Glen of Imaal, that together cost of £26,500 with an additional £1,500 for a bridge at Aghavannagh.

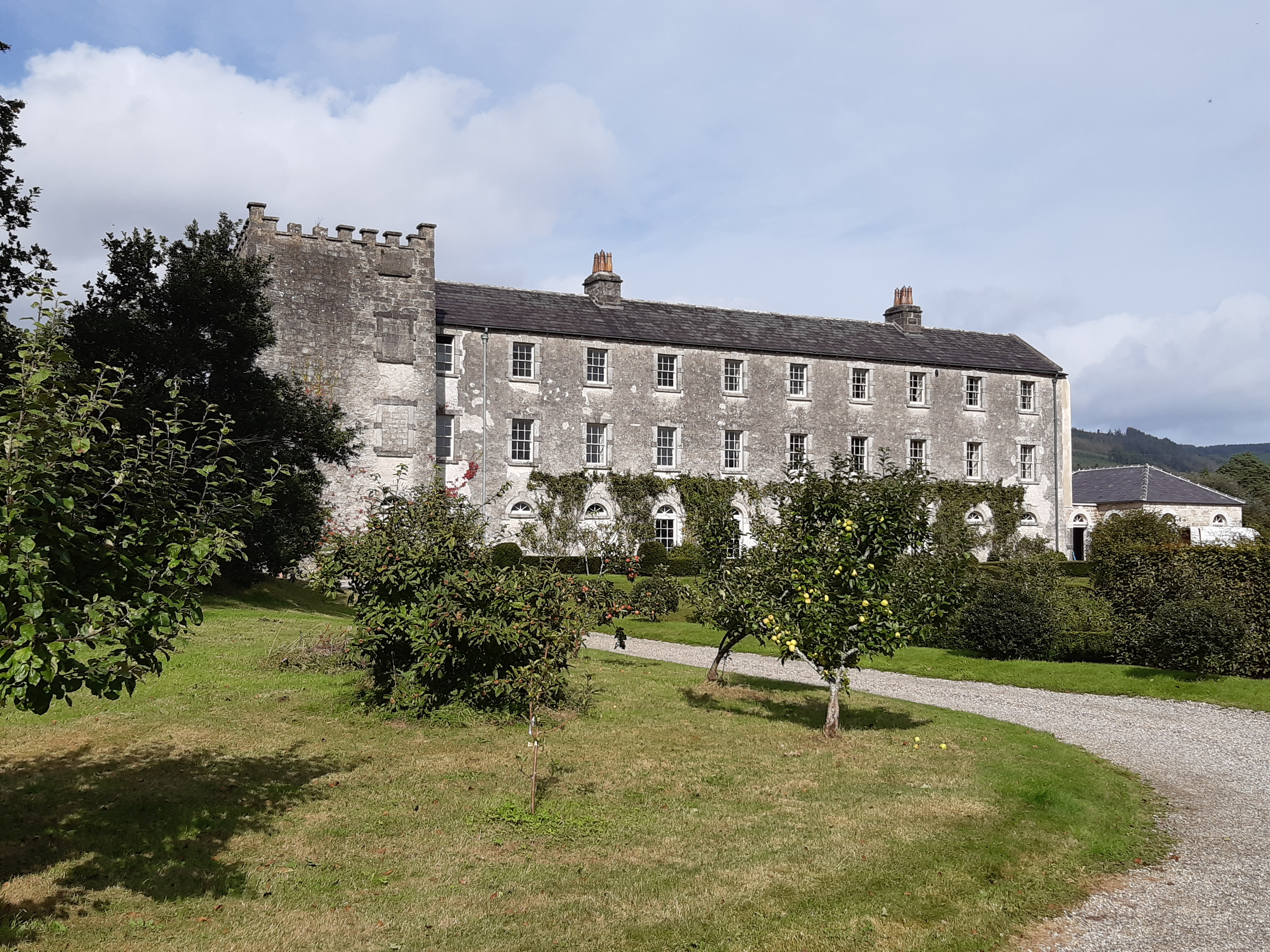
The former barracks, as seen from the entry gate, in September 2023

The property came into the ownership of Charles Stewart Parnell's grandfather after the British War Office vacated it in 1825 because he was the ground landlord and was used by him as a hunting lodge. The Parnell family shared the building with up to 50 men of the Irish Constabulary. Several of the outhouses were totally ruined at this time as were the two redoubts. Upon Parnell's death, John Redmond bought the barracks.

Later, An Óige ran the building as a youth hostel for several years before acquiring ownership in 1944. They closed it in 1998 when a tower of the structure was declared unstable by engineers. Síle de Valera, then Minister for Arts, Heritage, Gaeltacht and the Islands, answered a question in the Dáil whether the property would be acquired by the government as a heritage building saying that Dúchas, the heritage service of the department, did not have the resources to protect or preserve the building.

After 20 years, in 2010, a restoration project extensively restored the building's interior and exterior. It is now privately owned and used as a family home and guesthouse.

== See also ==
- Pat O'Brien
- Wicklow Way
