= Amber Butchart =

British fashion historian and writer

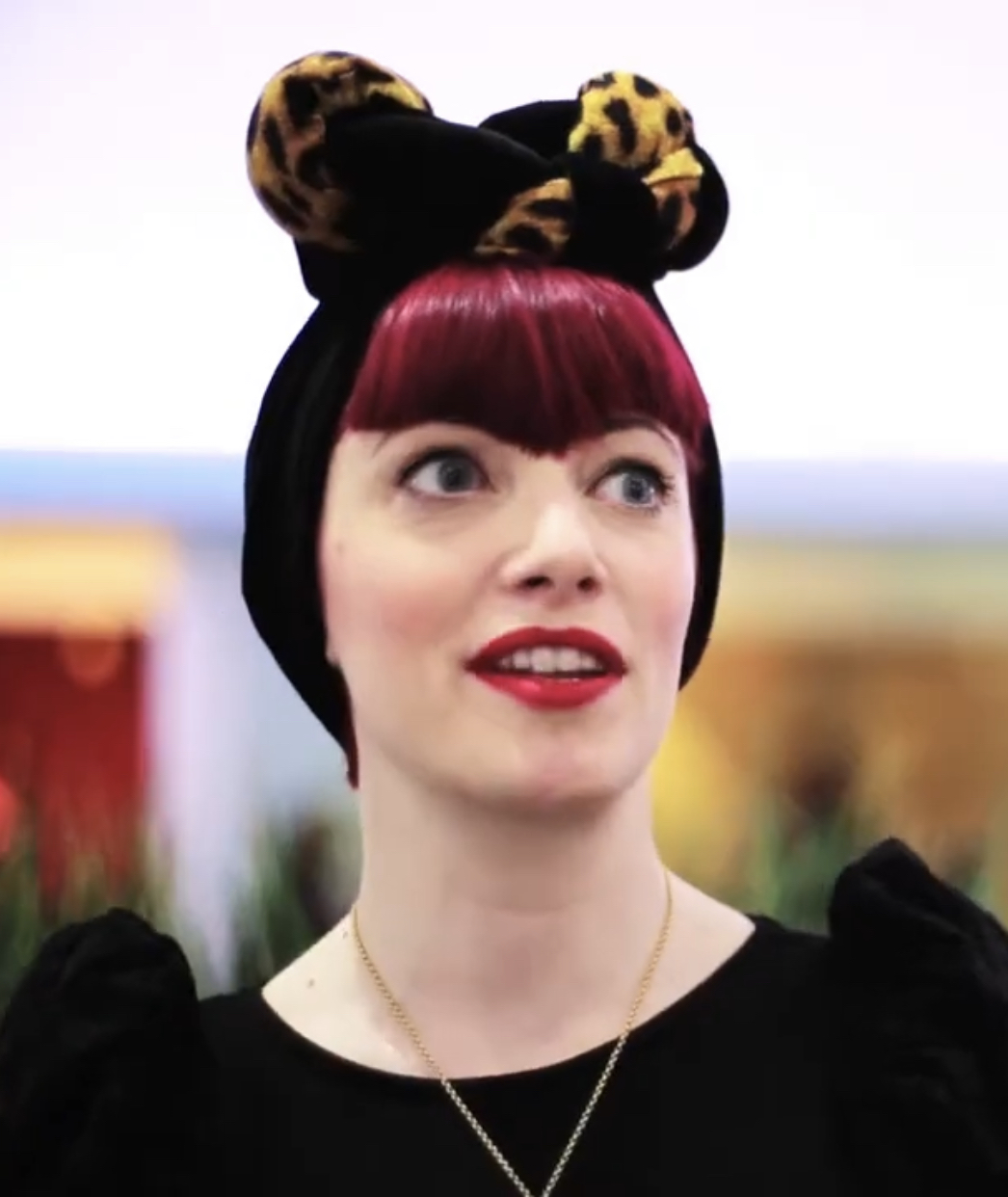
- Butchart in 2014
- Born: 1980 or 1981 (age 45–46)
- Occupations: Writer; Public historian

Academic background
- Education: London College of Fashion

Academic work
- Discipline: History
- Sub-discipline: History of fashion
- Institutions: London College of Fashion
- Website: www.amberbutchart.com

Amber Jane Butchart is a British fashion historian and writer. She has researched and appeared in programmes on the BBC, Channel 4, and Sky Arts. In 2018, she presented the BBC documentary series A Stitch in Time. Butchart teaches at London College of Fashion, and consults with the British police as a forensic garment analyst. She has also published several books on fashion history.

== Education and early life ==
Butchart grew up in Kessingland, Suffolk, and has an MA in History and Culture of Fashion from London College of Fashion, now part of the University of the Arts London.

== Career ==
Butchart is an associate lecturer at London College of Fashion, and was formerly head buyer for vintage clothing company Beyond Retro. Butchart also acts as a consultant forensic garment analyst to British police forces and crime scene investigators.

Butchart presented a segment in the BBC documentary series Civilisations Stories entitled The First Refugees regarding the silk-weaving Huguenot community of Spitalfields. In 2015 Butchart published Nautical Chic and curated an exhibition of the same name at the Fashion and Textile Museum.

Butchart is a regular guest on BBC Radio 4's Woman's Hour. In January 2017 she appeared on Radio 4's The Museum of Curiosity where her hypothetical donation to this imaginary museum was "the colour mauve". She has also produced a two-part documentary for Radio 4 about the history of the vintage fashion industry entitled From Rags to Riches.

Butchart presented A Stitch in Time, a six-part series about the history of fashion broadcast on BBC Four in 2018. The costumes created by Ninya Mikhaila for the show were exhibited at the National Trust's Ham House between February and April that year. The show was praised for its delivery and accessibility, with one reviewer noting "anyone watching this could gain a real insight into how historical pieces are made and reinterpreted".

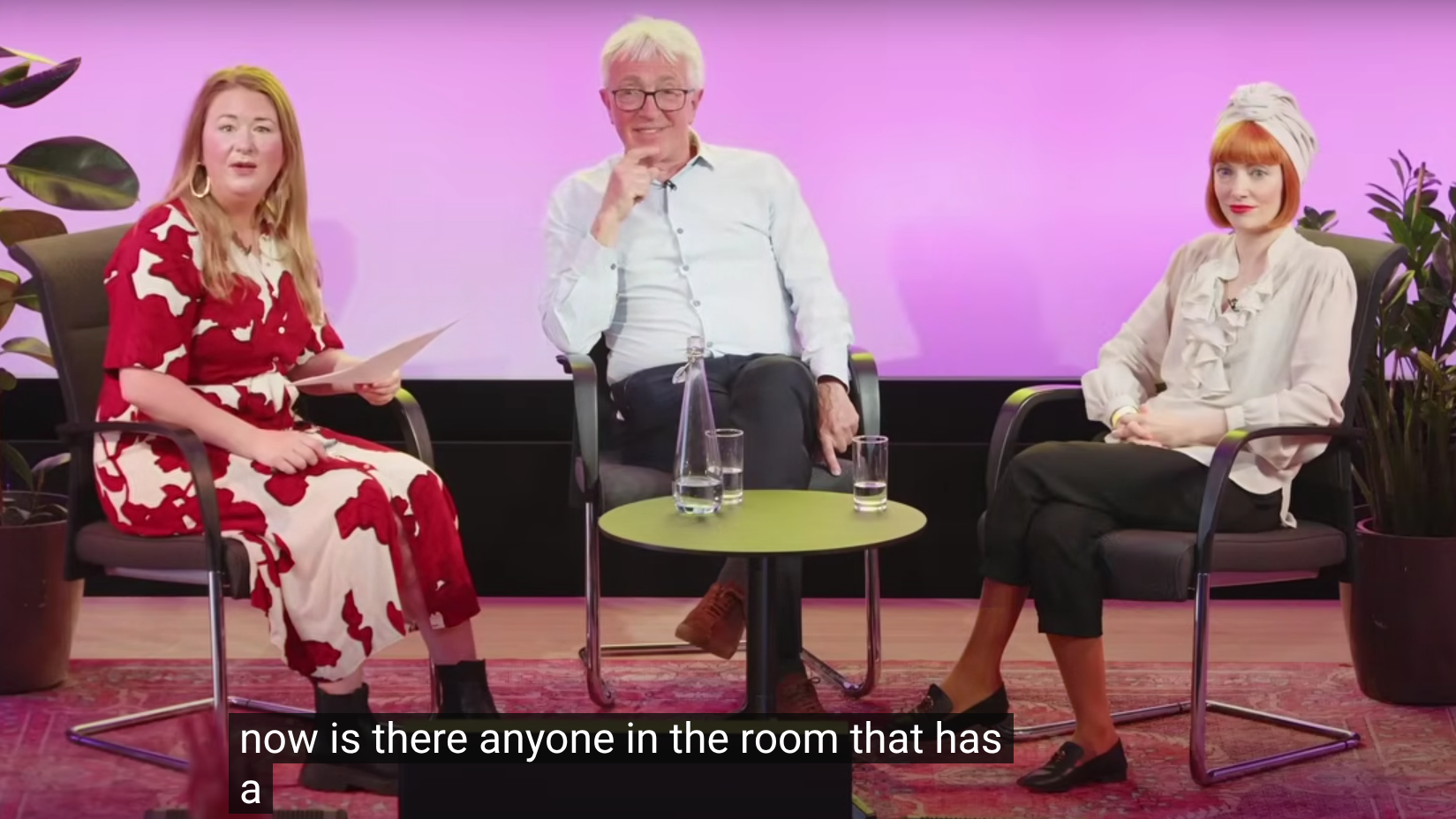
HistFest 250 Years of Jane Austen at the British Library in 2025 with Amber Butchart, John Mullan and historian Rebecca Rideal

With make-up artist Rebecca Butterworth, Butchart presented a six-part series of historic make-up tutorials for English Heritage. The series was part of the charity's efforts to expand its audience, and the campaign led to English Heritage winning the 'Grand Prix' and 'Best UK Breakthrough Advertiser' prizes at the 2019 YouTube Works Awards. The videos spanned the Roman period to the Second World War and were released between 2018 and 2019.

In 2020, Butchart and Clara Amfo presented a podcast series on the history of fashion. The following year, Butchard curated part of the British Textile Biennial, using items from the Gawthorpe Textile Collection. She curated an exhibition at the Fashion and Textile Museum titled The Fabric of Democracy: Propaganda textiles from the French Revolution to Brexit which ran from 2023 to 2024. In 2025, Butchart was the co-curator of the exhibition Splash! A Century of Swimming and Style at the Design Museum in London.

She regularly hosts fashion events, including Puttin’ on the Glitz: Fashion & Film in the Jazz Age at the British Library in 2014.

She was one half of DJ duo Broken Hearts along with Nisha Thirkell, which had a show on Jazz FM.

== Bibliography ==
- Muir, Robin; Butchart, Amber; Bouhassane, Ami (2021). Lee Miller: Fashion in Wartime Britain. Lee Miller Archives Publishing. ISBN 978-0-9532389-8-9.
- The Fashion Chronicles: Style Stories of History's Best Dressed (2018, Mitchell Beazley ISBN 978-1784723811)
- Fashion Illustration in Britain: Society and the Seasons (2017, British Library Publishing: ISBN 9780712352000)
- The Fashion of Film: Fashion Design Inspired by Cinema (2016, Octopus Books: ISBN 9781784721763)
- Nautical Chic (2015, Harry N. Abrams: ISBN 9781419716195)
- Amber Jane Butchart's Fashion Miscellany: An Elegant Collection of Stories, Quotations, Tips & Trivia from the World of Style (2014, Ilex Press: ISBN 978-1781571385)
