= Patrick Barry =

Pat or Patrick Barry may refer to:

- Patrick Barry (horticulturist) (1816–1890), American horticulturist
- Patrick Barry (bishop) (1868–1940), American Roman Catholic bishop
- Patrick Barry (judge) (1898–1972), British judge
- Pat Barry (hurler) (born 1951), hurler and Gaelic footballer
- Pat Barry (kickboxer) (born 1979), American kickboxer, sanshou practitioner, and mixed martial art fighter
- Patrick Barry (missionary) (died 1987), Irish educator and missionary better known as Brother Ignatius

== See also ==
- Paddy Barry (disambiguation)
- Patricia Barry (1921–2016), American actress
- Patrick Berry (born 1970), American puzzle creator
