= Thomas Burns =

Thomas Burns, Tommy Burns or Tom Burns may refer to:

== Politics ==
- Thomas Burns (politician) (born 1960), Nationalist Northern Irish politician
- Thomas Edward Burns (born 1927), Unionist Northern Irish politician
- Tom Burns (Australian politician) (1931–2007), former leader of the Australian Labor Party in Queensland

== Sports ==
- Thomas H. Burns (1879–1913), Hall of Fame Champion jockey
- Oyster Burns (Thomas P. Burns, 1864–1928), Major League Baseball player
- Tom Burns (baseball) (1857–1902), Major League Baseball player
- Tom Burns (footballer) (1916–1993), Australian rules footballer
- Tommy Burns (Australian boxer) (1922–2011), Australian Boxing Hall of Famer
- Tommy Burns (Canadian boxer) (1881–1955), Canadian heavyweight boxing world champion
- Tommy Burns (Canadian football) (1910–1942), all-star and Grey Cup champion
- Tommy Burns (diver) (1868–1897), English champion diver
- Tommy Burns (footballer) (1956–2008), Scottish football player and manager (Celtic, Kilmarnock, national team)
- T. P. Burns (1924–2018), Irish jockey
- Tom Burns (taekwondo) (born 2000)
- Horse murders#Tommy Burns, until 1991 arrest, a hired killer of heavily insured equestrian horses

== Other persons ==
- Thomas Burns (minister, born 1796) (1796–1871), minister and founding settler of Dunedin, New Zealand
- Thomas Burns (minister, born 1853) (1853–1938), Scottish minister
- Thomas J. Burns (1923–1996), American accounting scholar and professor of accounting
- Thomas S. Burns (born 1945), American historian
- Tom Burns (bishop) (born 1944), Catholic bishop
- Tom Burns (publisher) (1906–1995), British publisher
- Tom Burns (sociologist) (1913–2001), British sociologist, author and founder of the Sociology department at the University of Edinburgh
- Tom R. Burns (1937–2025), American/Swedish sociologist, professor of sociology at the University of Uppsala
- E. L. M. Burns (1897–1985), Canadian general, known as "Tommy"

== See also ==
- Tommy Byrnes (1923–1981), American basketball player
- Thomas Byrne (disambiguation)
- Thomas Byrnes (disambiguation)
