= Lucy & Yak =

Clothing brand

- Industry: Fashion
- Founded: July 2017; 9 years ago
- Founder: Lucy Greenwood; Christopher Renwick
- Area served: United Kingdom
- Products: Dungarees
- Revenue: £22.7 million (2022)
- Number of employees: 180 (2023)
- Website: lucyandyak.com

Lucy & Yak is a British clothing brand established in 2017 by creative director Lucy Greenwood and CEO Christopher Renwick, which is mainly known for its sale of dungarees. It has physical stores in Brighton, Norwich, Bristol, Exeter, Canterbury, Nottingham, Manchester, Cambridge, Edinburgh, Cardiff and Portsmouth. The brand markets itself as sustainable, body positive and mostly gender-neutral.

== History ==
Lucy Greenwood says that she and her partner, Chris Greenwood, visited New Zealand, making money by collecting T-shirts from lost and found at hostels around the country and using the fabric to make tobacco pouches. On return to the UK, Greenwood began selling vintage clothing on Depop, where the pair noticed a gap in the market for dungarees.

The couple founded Lucy & Yak in July 2017 in Barnsley, South Yorkshire as a direct-to-consumer e-commerce brand. They contacted a factory in India which was sewing garments for its local markets, and began to make use of leftover fabric from larger fashion companies that they found on Indian market stalls. The company is named after Greenwood's first name and her campervan named Yak, and was initially known solely for its sale of dungarees, beginning with 30 pairs of dungarees as its stock, but later expanded to other categories. It opened its first physical store in Brighton in 2019.

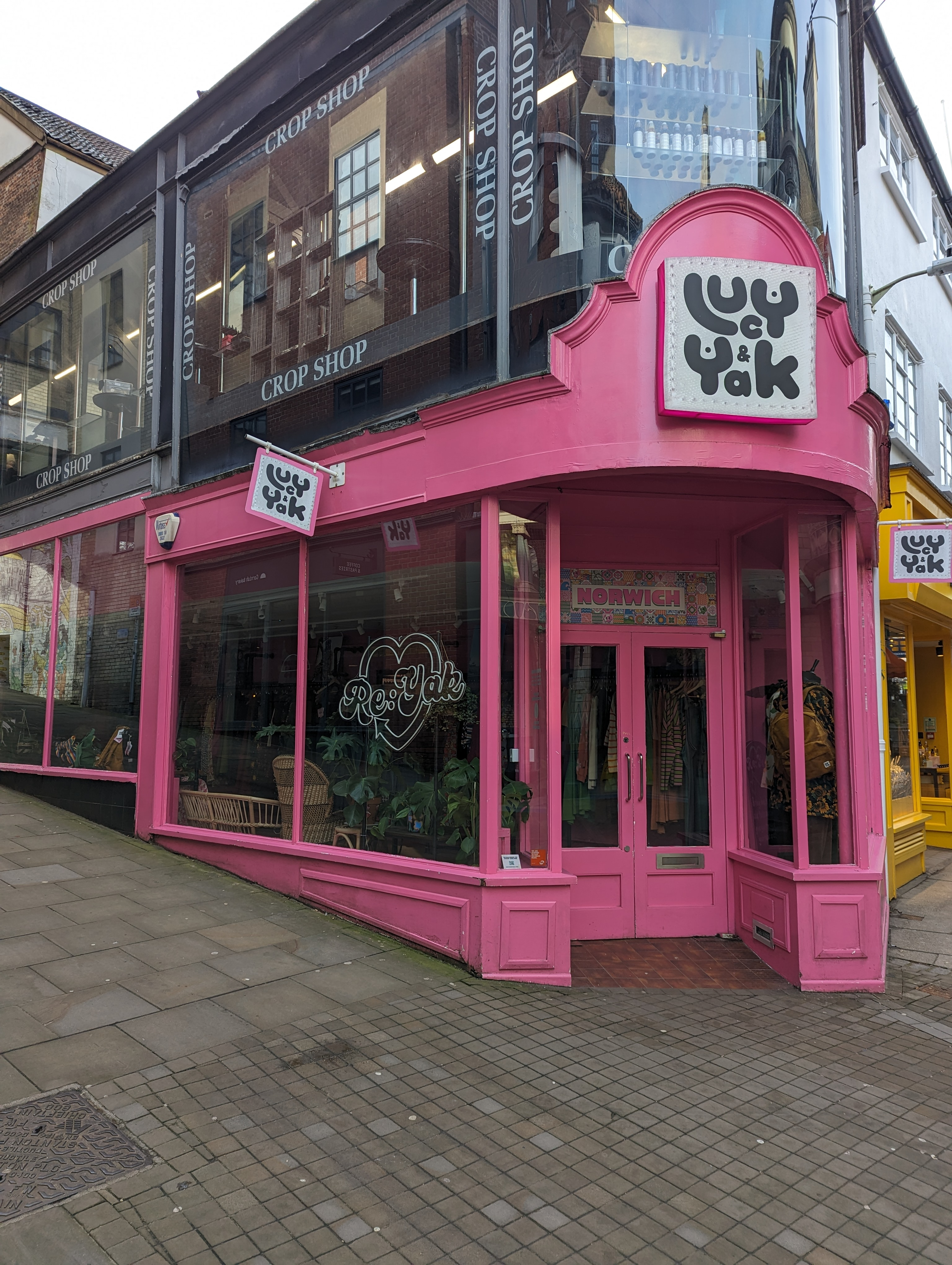
A pink Lucy & Yak storefront in Norwich

In July 2022, the company announced a collaboration with Ed Sheeran, inspired by the artwork of his album Equals with an ecru and black butterfly print. Lucy & Yak stores opened in Bristol in March, and in Norwich in November. In 2022, they had a revenue of £22.7 million.

In 2023, they aimed to open four physical stores by the end of the year. Opening stores in Nottingham in January, Cambridge in April, and by April 2023, had 180 employees, two offices, a warehouse and five shops. A Manchester branch was opened in July. The Cardiff branch opened in September 2023, in Morgan Arcade. In July 2025 Greenwood resigned as director.

=== Sustainability ===
Both The Independent and Euronews have stated that Lucy & Yak has "sustainability at its core". It makes use of GOTS-certified organic cotton in its dungarees and other items, sourced from India. This is supported by Fior Di Loto, a charitable foundation for the improvement of education and living conditions of girls in the villages surrounding Pushkar.⁣ Its tailors are paid four times the state minimum wage in India, and its factories operate on solar energy. The company has expanded to use Lenzing Ecovero fabric, flax linen, organic cotton, deadstock cotton and recycled plastic bottles in its clothing, and uses fully biodegradable, reusable or recycled packaging.

The company has instituted Re:Yak, an in-store buy-back scheme for its clothing, before it had expanded into physical stores, initially making use of Beyond Retro stores to facilitate the process. The scheme gave a £20 Lucy & Yak voucher valid on purchases over £50 to those who returned their worn items, which are then resold or recycled depending on their condition. On 23 January 2023, the company expanded the process to its own stores.

In 2026, the brand faced criticism around their stated body positivity goals after they announced they would be discontinuing sizes 32 and 4XL. The brand claimed this was due to the sizes not selling as well as others, leaving them with excess stock that they then sold through their (Im)perfect Sales scheme. Some consumers called for the brand to make made to order variations of these sizes, allowing them to still be available to customers while still preventing wastage. Others voiced their concerns around what they felt was a shift in Lucy & Yak's sustainability practices, with the brands increased use of discounts, frequent new releases, and a drop in the quality of the clothing.
