= Charles Byrne =

Charles Byrne may refer to:

- Charles Byrne (giant) (1761–1783), also known as "The Irish Giant"
- Charles Alfred Byrne (1848–1909), American journalist and playwright
- Charles C. Byrne (1837–1921), brigadier general in the United States Army
- Charles Byrne (artist) (1757–1810?) , Irish painter of miniatures
- Charlie Byrne (footballer) (1895–1924), Australian rules footballer
- Charlie Byrne (baseball) (1843–1898), original owner of the Brooklyn Dodgers baseball team

== See also ==
- Charles Burns (disambiguation)
