= Anthony Burns (disambiguation) =

Anthony Burns (1834–1862) was an American escaped slave.

Anthony Burns may also refer to:

- Anthony Burns (politician)
- Anthony Scott Burns (born 1977), Canadian filmmaker and artist
- M. Anthony Burns (born 1942), American businessman
- Tony Burns (born 1944), footballer
- Tony Burns (boxing) (c. 1940–2021), amateur boxer and boxing trainer

== See also ==
- Anthony Byrne (disambiguation)
