= General Byrne =

General Byrne may refer to:

- Charles C. Byrne (1837–1921), U.S. Army brigadier general
- Joseph Byrne (British Army officer) (1874–1942), British Army brigadier general
- Kevin P. Byrnes (born 1950), U.S. Army general
