= Sean Burns =

Sean Burns may refer to:

- Sean Burns (administrator) (1961–2023), Administrator of Ascension and Administrator of Tristan da Cunha
- Sean Burns (footballer) (born 1991), Scottish football player
- Sean Burns, a fictional character in the Highlander films

== See also ==
- Sean Byrne (disambiguation)
- Sean Byrnes, professional and life partner of Francesco Scavullo
