= Christopher Byrne =

Christopher Byrne may refer to:

- Christopher Byrne (politician) (1886–1957), Irish Cumann na nGaedheal and later Fianna Fáil politician
- Christopher Edward Byrne (1867–1950), American prelate of the Roman Catholic Church
- Chris Byrne (footballer) (born 1975), retired English footballer
- Chris Byrne (musician), musician with Black 47

== See also ==
- Byrne (surname)
