= Mary Burns (disambiguation) =

Mary Burns (1821–1863) was an Irish partner of Friedrich Engels.

Mary Burns may also refer to:

- Mary Burns (soldier), soldier in the United States Civil War
- Mary Burns Laird (?–1944), Scottish feminist activist
- Marilyn Burns (Mary Lynn Ann Burns, 1950–2014), American actress
- Mary Harcourt, Viscountess Harcourt (1874–1961), born Mary Ethel Burns

== See also ==
- Sister Mary Grace Burns Arboretum, Lakewood Township, New Jersey, USA
- Mary Burns, Fugitive, a 1935 film
- Mary Byrne (disambiguation)
