= Mary Byrne =

Mary Byrne may refer to:

- Mary Byrne (mayor) (1917–2004), mayor of Galway
- Mary Byrne (singer) (born 1959), Irish singer, 2010 The X Factor UK contestant
- Mary Ann Byrne (1854–1894), Irish nationalist
- Mary Elizabeth Byrne (1880–1931), Irish author and linguist
- Mary Freeman Byrne (1886–1961), American author
- Mary Gregg Byrne (born 1951), American portraitist, illustrator, and landscape artist
- Mary Byrne (witness) (1850–1936), Irish woman considered to be the chief witness of the apparition at Knock, County Mayo
- Mary Martha Byrne (born 1969), American actress
- Mary Rose Byrne (born 1979), Australian actress
- Mary Green (painter) (1766–1845), née Byrne, British painter

== See also ==
- Mary Burns (disambiguation)
- Byrne (surname)
