= Jerry Byrne =

Jerry Byrne may refer to:

- Jerry Byrne (baseball) (1907–1955), pitcher in Major League Baseball
- Jerry Byrne (singer) (1941–2010), American rock and roll singer
- Jerry Byrne MP, Hampden, Newfoundland and Labrador

== See also ==
- Gerry Byrne (disambiguation)
