= Tommy Byrne (baseball) =

American baseball player (1919–2007)

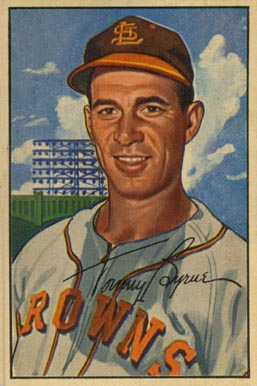
- Pitcher
- Born: December 31, 1919; Baltimore, Maryland, U.S.
- Died: December 20, 2007 (aged 87); Wake Forest, North Carolina, U.S.
- Batted: Left Threw: Left

MLB debut
- April 27, 1943, for the New York Yankees

Last MLB appearance
- September 21, 1957, for the New York Yankees

MLB statistics
- Win–loss record: 85–69
- Earned run average: 4.11
- Strikeouts: 766
- Stats at Baseball Reference

Teams
- New York Yankees (1943, 1946–1951); St. Louis Browns (1951–1952); Chicago White Sox (1953); Washington Senators (1953); New York Yankees (1954–1957)

Career highlights and awards
- All-Star (1950); 2× World Series champion (1949, 1956)

For other people named Thomas Byrne, see Thomas Byrne (disambiguation)

Thomas Joseph Byrne (December 31, 1919 – December 20, 2007) was an American left-handed starting pitcher in Major League Baseball who played for four American League teams from 1943 through 1957, primarily the New York Yankees. He also played for the St. Louis Browns (1951–52), Chicago White Sox (1953) and Washington Senators (1953). Byrne batted and threw left-handed.

== Education and military service ==
Byrne attended the Baltimore City College high school and Wake Forest College. In November 1943, Byrne was commissioned an ensign in the United States Navy and was stationed at Naval Training Station Norfolk, Virginia. In 1944, he reported to the destroyer USS Ordronaux (DD-617) to serve as the gunnery officer, with a deployment to the Mediterranean Sea during World War II.

== Baseball career ==
Byrne was a hard-throwing pitcher who never hesitated to pitch inside, but he had struggled with his control most of his career, earning him the nickname "Wild Man". After making his debut on April 27, 1943, he had four years with more than 130 innings pitched and more than 6 walks per nine innings, a record later tied by Nolan Ryan. Byrne led the league in hit batsmen five times and in walks three times. Despite his wildness, he won 15 games twice (1949–50) and enjoyed a career season in 1955 with a 16–5 record and a 3.15 earned run average, and led the league in winning percentage (.762).

Despite his struggles on the mound, Byrne excelled offensively. He hit well enough during his career to be called on by his managers for pinch-hitting duties. He batted .238 in his career (143-for-601) with 14 home runs and 98 runs batted in during 377 games, including two grand slams.

In a 13-year career, Byrne posted an 85–69 record with a 4.11 earned run average in 1362 innings. He had a disappointing 0.74 strikeout-to-walk ratio (766-to-1037) and averaged 6.85 walks per nine innings. In four World Series, he went 2–2 with 11 strikeouts, 12 walks and a 2.53 earned run average in 21 1/3 innings. He made the American League All-Star team in 1950. He played his final regular-season game on September 21, 1957, before ending his career in the World Series defeat to the Milwaukee Braves.

== Later life ==
After the conclusion of his baseball career, Byrne returned to Wake Forest, North Carolina, where he had attended college (although the college had since relocated to Winston-Salem). Prior to the 1963 season, he joined the New York Mets organization as a minor league scout. When Clyde McCullough was promoted to the Mets as a coach, Byrne took over the manager's job for the Raleigh Mets of the Carolina League. He managed the team from July 29 through the end of the season.

Byrne later became mayor of Wake Forest from 1973 through 1987. He died on December 20, 2007, at age 87 in Wake Forest, North Carolina, eleven days before his 88th birthday.

== See also ==
- List of Major League Baseball career hit batsmen leaders
