= Charles Burns =

Charles Burns may refer to:

- Charles Burns (cartoonist) (born 1955), American cartoonist and illustrator
- Charles Burns (medical doctor) (1898–1985), New Zealand doctor
- Charles A. Burns (1863–1930), American businessman
- C. B. Burns (Charles Brittingham Burns, 1879–1968), baseball player
- Charles F. W. Burns (1907–1982), Canadian investment dealer.
- Charles H. Burns (1835–1909), American attorney and politician in New Hampshire
- Charlie Burns (politician), American politician in New Hampshire
- Charlie Burns (1936–2021), American ice hockey player
- Mr. Burns, full name Charles Montgomery Plantagenet Schicklgruber Burns, fictional character from the American animated sitcom The Simpsons

== See also ==
- Charlie Burns (footballer) (born 1995), English footballer
- Charles Byrne (disambiguation)
