= Brother Ignatius =

Irish educator and missionary

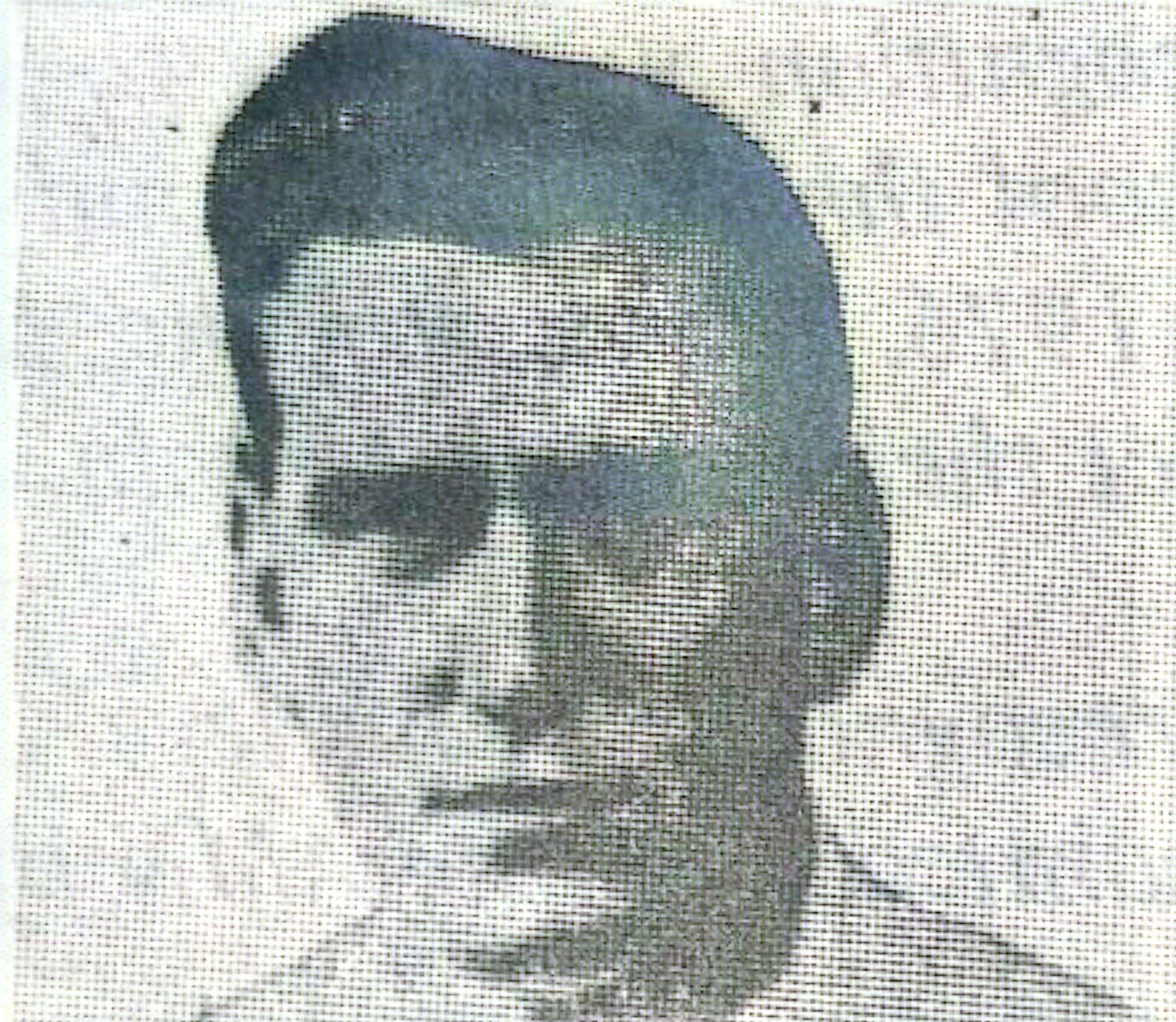
Brother Ignatius in the early 1960s.

Patrick Barry (1914 or 1915 – 12 August 1987), better known under the religious name Brother Ulric Ignatius or simply Brother Ignatius, was a prominent Irish educator and missionary who served as the director of St. Joseph's Institution in Singapore and St. John's Institution in Kuala Lumpur.

== Early life and education ==
Brother Ignatius was born in the mid-1910s. He trained under the De La Salle Brothers in Dublin in his youth.

== Career ==
Brother Ignatius came to British Malaya as a missionary around 1930. He taught in Taiping, Perak in this period. He came to Singapore in 1938 to teach at the St. Joseph's Institution (SJI). The school ceased to operate during the Japanese occupation of Singapore, which began in February 1942, just as the school year began. On the resumption of lessons in 1946, Brother Ignatius taught most of the lessons. The school had been stripped of most of its equipment, and he would be "shivering" as he taught. However, he "did not have to shoulder the teaching alone" as the students received "some help" in science from Raffles Institution.

Brother Ignatius was appointed the headmaster of SJI, a position then referred to as Brother Director, in 1951. Under his directorship, the number of students the school had grew to 8,000 from 1,800 before the occupation. This made it the second largest institution run by the De La Salle Brothers. He organised the school's cadets, scouts, St. John Ambulance brigade and Animal Lovers League. Brother Ignatius was "instrumental" in raising the funds necessary for the construction of St. Michael's School, De La Salle primary school, on Thomson Road. The school opened in 1954. He also played a significant role in the founding of the De La Salle School in Kampong Bahru in 1952.

Brother Ignatius believed that the home, the school and the church were the "only three places a boy should be in", and that if he "wishes to go elsewhere, there is something seriously wrong with his training." He felt that it was important to "try to develop a good civic spirit in each [student] so that they would know how to conduct themselves at all times." A student of his, Goh Sin Tub, felt that Brother Ignatius was "ahead of his time" in that he "believed in total education; of the mind, soul and body." In 1956, he was appointed to the Singapore Education Committee. Brother Ignatius resigned as principal of SJI in 1957. A farewell dinner and dance was held at the school hall on 10 February; this was attended by over 200 people. He left Singapore on long leave on 4 March.

Brother Ignatius briefly served as the Brother Director of the St. John's Institution in Kuala Lumpur. Brother Kevin Byrne, who served under Brother Ignatius at St. John's and who would go on to serve as the principal of SJI, remembered Brother Ignatius as a "man of great wisdom".

== Personal life and death ==
Brother Ignatius actively worked with the Singapore Recorded Music Society, which presented him with a gift for his contributions to the society in December 1956.

During the Japanese occupation, which lasted from 1942 to 1945, Brother Ignatius was sent to the failed Bahau settlement, where he contracted malaria. Even after recovering, he would continue to experience "recurrent bouts" of the disease. After retiring, he left for Ireland and spent his final years at the Castle Town Home for Retired Brothers. He died there on 12 August 1987 while receiving treatment for malaria and high blood pressure.
