= Tommy Byrne =

Tommy Byrne may refer to:

- Tommy Byrne (baseball) (1919–2007), Major League Baseball player
- Tommy Byrne (musician) (born 1944), musician with the group Wolfe Tones
- Tommy Byrne (racing driver) (born 1958), former Formula One racing driver

== See also ==
- Thomas Byrne (disambiguation)
