= Tony Burns (boxing) =

Welsh boxer and trainer (1940–2021)

Tony Burns MBE
- Born: 1940
- Died: 1 February 2021 (aged 80)
- Occupation(s): Boxer, Trainer
- Employer: Repton Boxing Club

Tony Burns, MBE (1940 – 1 February 2021) was an amateur boxer and trainer. He worked at Repton Boxing Club in London where he trained fighters for more than 60 years.

== Biography ==
Burns was born in Wales, where his father was stationed as a soldier. When his mother died he travelled alone to London aged 5 to meet his father for the first time. He moved to London from Wales where he began boxing for Repton Boxing Club.

Audley Harrison trained under Burns during his time at Repton, where he won super-heavyweight crowns for ABA in 1997 and 1998, as well as Commonwealth super-heavyweight title in 1998. He also helped train approximately 300 boxers who received national titles and 10 who went on to the Olympic Games.

In 2009, he was awarded the MBE for his work in amateur boxing.

== Notes ==
- Gangsters and Boxers in London's East End
