= Gerry Byrne =

Gerry Byrne may refer to:

- Gerry Byrne (politician) (born 1966), Canadian politician
- Gerry Byrne (footballer, born 1938) (1938–2015), English footballer with Liverpool
- Gerry Byrne (footballer, born 1957), Scottish footballer with Cardiff City
- Gerry Byrne, chairman of Bank Zachodni WBK

== See also ==
- Gerald G. Byrne (1890–1952), Newfoundland politician
- Gerard Byrne (disambiguation)
- Jerry Byrne (disambiguation)
- Jere Burns (born 1954), American actor
- Jerry Burns (1927–2021), American football coach
