= Jason Byrne =

Jason Byrne may refer to:

- Jason Byrne (comedian) (born 1972), Irish comedian and radio host
- Jason Byrne (footballer) (born 1978), Irish footballer
- Jason Byrne (writer), author of the book Guide to Webcams
