= Bill Byrne (footballer, born 1896) =

Australian rules footballer

- Byrne in 1916

Personal information
- Full name: William Joseph Byrne
- Born: 14 August 1896; Fitzroy, Victoria
- Died: 19 July 1930 (aged 33); Fitzroy, Victoria
- Original team: Brighton

Playing career^{1}
Years	Club	Games (Goals)
1917	Fitzroy	10 (2)
- ^{1} Playing statistics correct to the end of 1917.

William Byrne (14 August 1896 – 19 July 1930) was an Australian rules footballer who played for the Fitzroy Football Club in the Victorian Football League (VFL).

His brother Charlie Byrne also played with him at Fitzroy.
