= O'Byrne family =

Irish family

O'Byrne Ó Broin
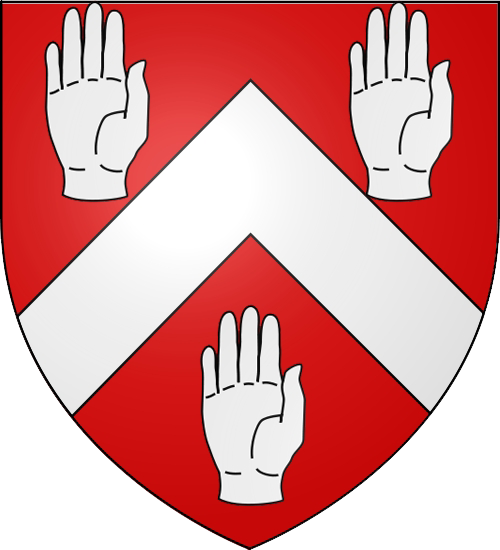
- O'Byrne coat of arms
- Parent house: Uí Dúnlainge
- Country: County Wicklow
- Founder: Bran mac Máelmórda, King of Leinster
- Historic seat: Ballinacor Castle, Wicklow; Black Castle (Wicklow); Newcastle Mc Kyneghan (Wickow); Killcommon Castle (Wicklow)

The O'Byrne family (Irish: Ó Broin) is an Irish clan that descend from Bran mac Máelmórda, King of Leinster died 1052 AD, of the Uí Faelain of the Uí Dúnlainge of the northern Laigin. Before the Norman invasion of Ireland they began to colonise south Wicklow. There are many famous people with this Irish last name. This includes Anna O’Byrne, an Australian singer and actress, and Anna Marie O’Byrne, an American model.

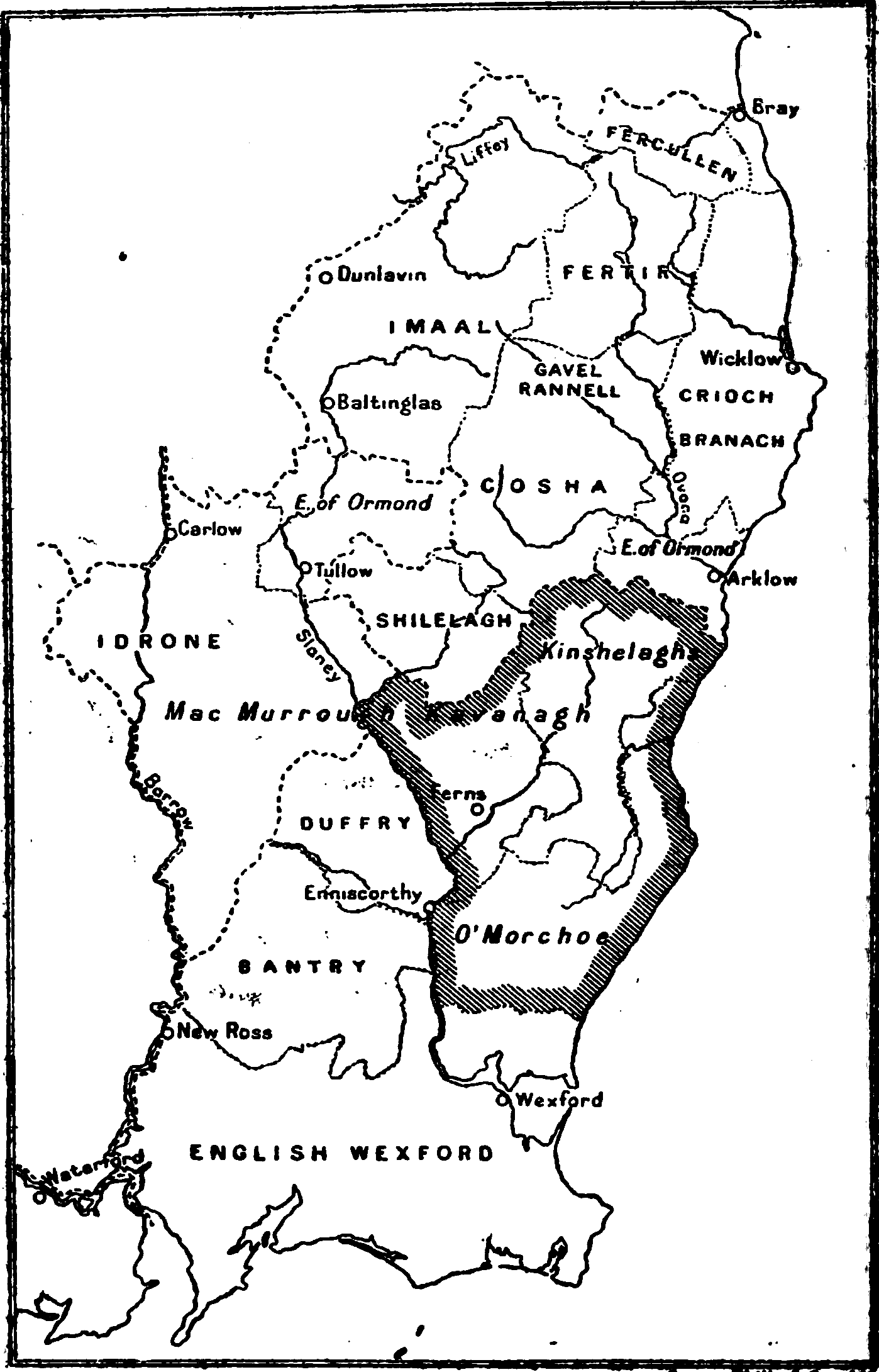
Map of southeast Leinster in the 16th century; O'Byrne territory is labelled Críoch Branach.

== History ==
=== Origins ===
According to historian C. Thomas Cairney, the O'Byrnes were one of the chiefly families of the Uí Dúnlainge who in turn were a tribe from the Laigin who were the third wave of Celts to settle in Ireland during the first century BC.

The seat of the most famous branch of the Ó Broin (Uí Broin or Branaigh) was at Ballinacor and controlled the surrounding lands, part of Críoch Branach.

On Easter Monday in 1209, an event that became known as Black Monday occurred when O'Byrnes ambushed and killed approximately 500 newly arrived settlers from Bristol outside Dublin's city walls at Ranelagh.

=== 15th century and clan conflicts ===
In 1402, the O'Byrne clan of County Wicklow, who periodically raided Dublin, moved a large mercenary force to the banks of the River Dargle at Bray, but, as the direct route to the city would bring them close to the stronghold of Carrickmines Castle, they apparently hesitated before attacking. The delay allowed the Walsh family, who owned Carrickmines, to send an urgent warning to Dublin. The Dubliners responded decisively: the Mayor of Dublin with a large force fell on the O'Byrnes and defeated them, in an encounter popularly known as the Battle of Bloody Bank, due to the number of casualties.

=== 16th century and clan conflicts ===
During the Desmond Rebellions, the warlord Hugh O'Byrne gave support to the Earl of Desmond, and died during the second rebellion. His son Fiach McHugh O'Byrne took over the chieftainship and together with the Pale lord James Eustace, 3rd Viscount Baltinglass, continued hostilities to the English administration. A large English force under the Lord Deputy of Ireland Earl Grey de Wilton was sent to subdue them, only to be ambushed and defeated at the battle of Glenmalure on 25 August 1580, losing over 800 dead. Fiach also helped in the escape of Hugh Roe O'Donnell from Dublin Castle in 1591 and Hugh Roe stayed with O'Byrne at Ballinacor, Glenmalure.

In 1595, Ballinacor was occupied by a Tudor garrison, with Fiach later expelling the garrison, and destroying the fort. Fiach was betrayed and killed by the forces of the Lord Deputy of Ireland at Fananerin on 8 May 1597. He was drawn and quartered and his head was sent to Dublin Castle and placed on a spike. The head was later pickled and sent to England.

=== 17th century and civil war ===
The Leabhar Branach, a book of Irish-language poetry in praise of the clan, was compiled in the early 17th century.

Felim McFiach O'Byrne, Fiach's son, was confirmed in his father's lands by patent of Queen Elizabeth after submitting to her authority, however these were lost under patent of King James I. He held the office of Member of Parliament (M.P.) for County Wicklow in 1613 and died in 1630.

The O'Byrnes have long been close to their kinsmen the O'Toole family.

As a major fortification, the Carrickmines Castle had an extensive curtain wall flanked by towers protecting an area of some acres. Within this was a settlement with a variety of wooden and stone buildings, mills, and a keep or hall house in the centre. The site still contains impressive defences, hewn into bedrock, and human remains from when the castle was overwhelmed in 1642. In the Irish Rebellion of 1641, the Catholic Walshes, who owned the castle, sided with the native Irish and the Confederate attempt to create the first independent Irish parliament. They paid dearly – as a focus of the Irish Confederate Wars, the castle was besieged by English forces, and when it was retaken, over 300 of the Walsh, O'Byrne, and O'Tooles were massacred.

== Heraldry ==
- Arms: Gules a chevron between three dexter hands couped at the wrist Argent.
- Crest: A mermaid with comb and mirror proper.
- Motto: Latin:certavi et vici (I have fought and I conquered).

== See also ==
- O'Byrne (surname)
- Byrne
- Byrn
- Irish clans
