= Ballinacor South =

Barony in County Wicklow, Ireland

Ballinacor South Baile na Corra Theas (Irish)
- Barony
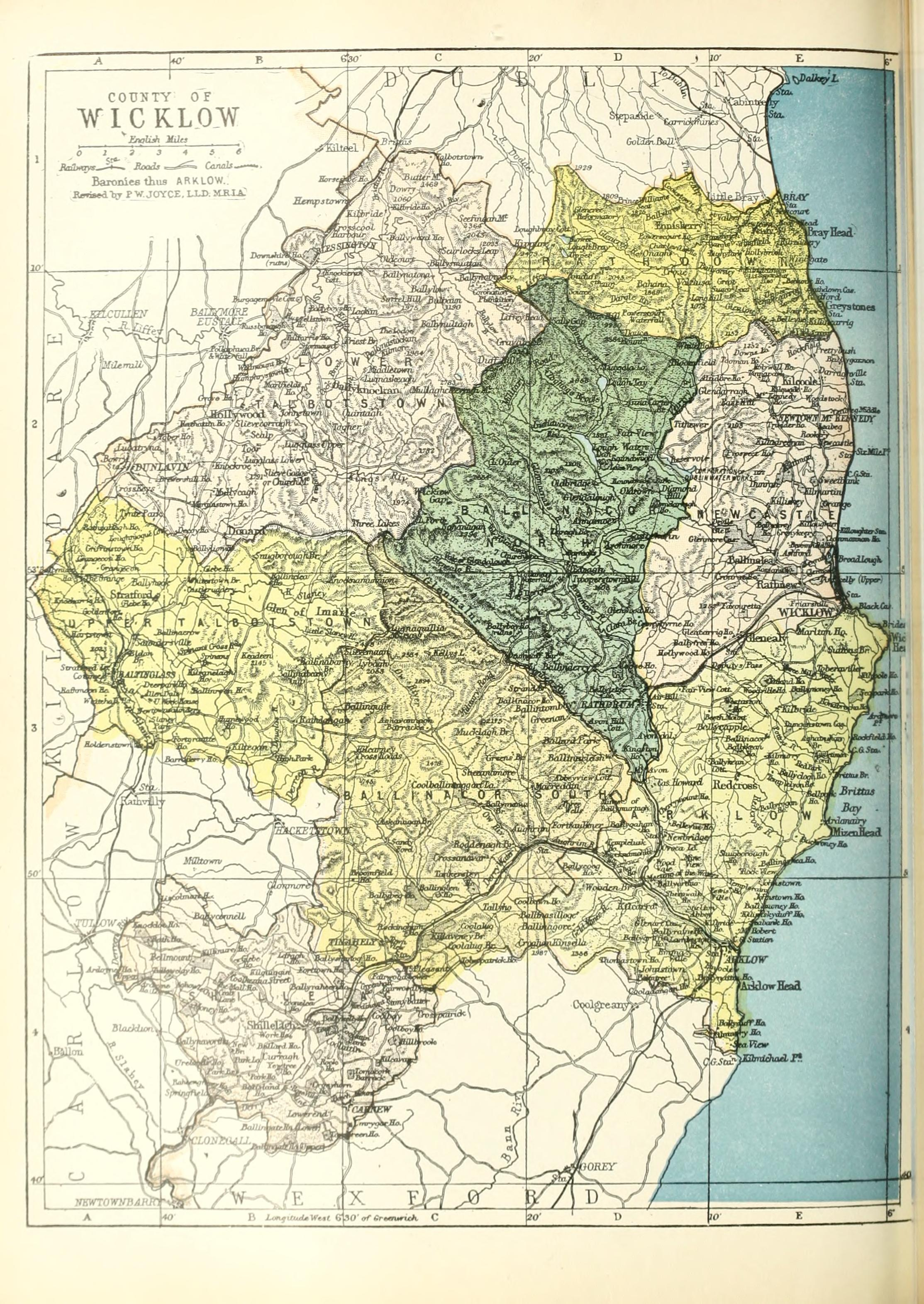
- Baronies of County Wicklow. Ballinacor South is shaded yellow.
- Coordinates: 52.898266°N 6.390409°W
- Sovereign state: Ireland
- County: Wicklow

Area
  - Total: 316.93 km^{2} (122.37 sq mi)

Ballinacor South (Irish: Baile na Corra Theas) is a barony in County Wicklow, Ireland. This geographical unit of land is one of eight baronies in County Wicklow. It is located in the southern Wicklow Mountains. Its chief town is Aughrim. The barony lies between Ballinacor North to the north (whose chief town is Rathdrum), Arklow to the east (whose chief town is Arklow), Shillelagh to the south (whose chief town is Carnew) and Upper Talbotstown to the west (whose chief town is Baltinglass). It is currently administered by Wicklow County Council.

== Legal context ==
Baronies were created after the Norman invasion of Ireland as divisions of counties and were used in the administration of justice and the raising of revenue. While baronies continue to be officially defined units, they have been administratively obsolete since 1898. However, they continue to be used in land registration and in specification, such as in planning permissions. In many cases, a barony corresponds to an earlier Gaelic túath which had submitted to the Crown. This is probably true in the case of Balinacor - see History below.

== History ==
The barony derives its name from the Ballinacor Castle (Irish: Baile na Corra, town of the weir). It was the main castle of the O'Byrne (Ó Broin) clan. The clan migrated from Kildare to Ballinacor around the 12th century. It included the territory of Gabhal Raghnaill. The barony was divided into South and North in 1798.

== List of settlements ==
List of civil parishes in the barony: Kilcommon, Preben, Kilpipe.

Below is a list of settlements in Ballinacor South:

- Tinahely
