= Thomas Byrnes =

Thomas Byrnes may refer to:

- Thomas Joseph Byrnes (1860–1898), Premier of Queensland
- Thomas F. Byrnes (1842–1910), New York City Police inspector
- Thomas F. Byrnes (politician) (1859–1916), American politician from New York
- Tommy Byrnes (1923–1981), American basketball player

== See also ==
- Thomas Byrne (disambiguation)
- Thomas Burns (disambiguation)
