= Ballinacor North =

Barony in County Wicklow, Ireland

Ballinacor North Baile na Corra Thuaidh (Irish)
- Barony
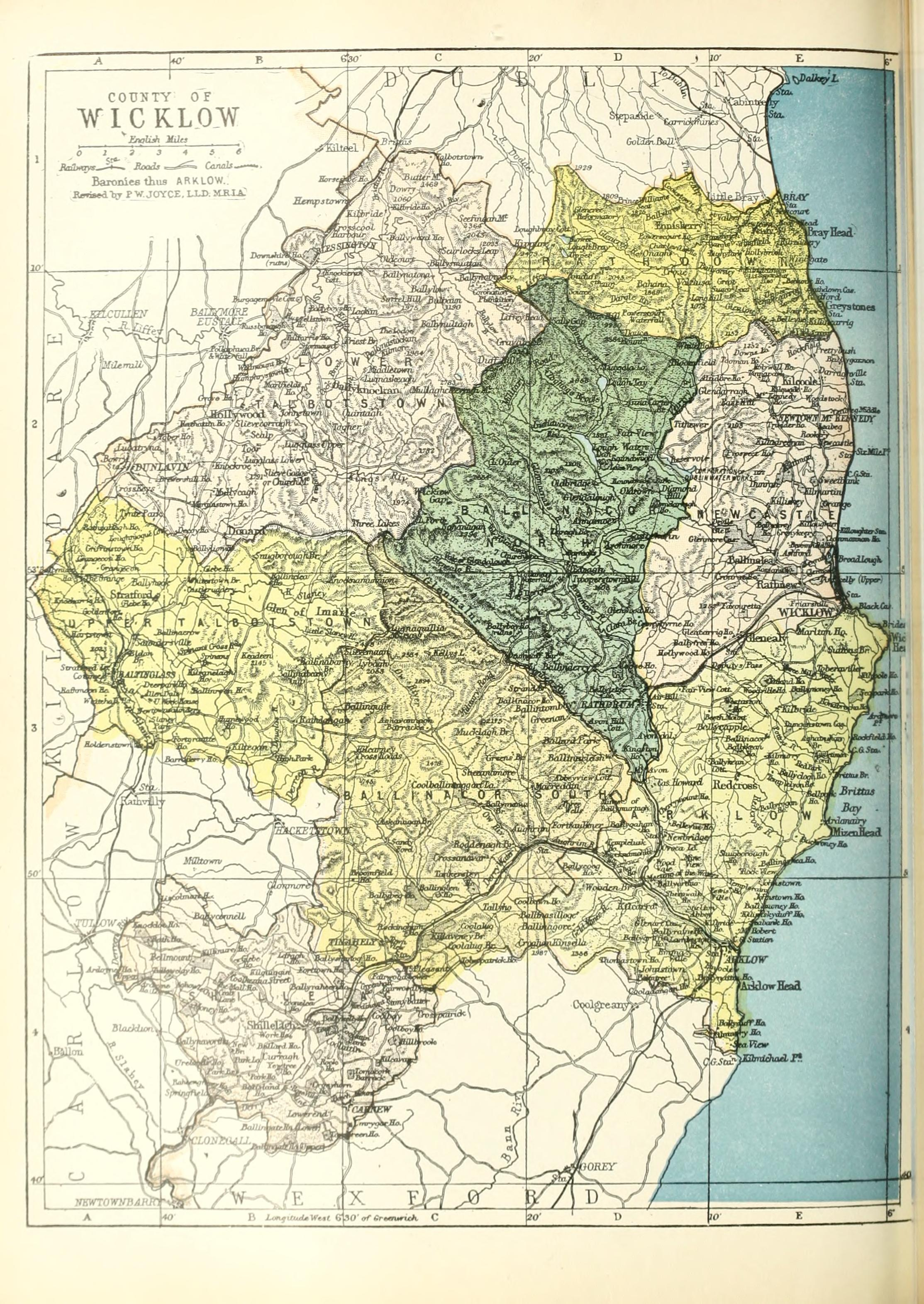
- Baronies of County Wicklow. Ballinacor North is shaded green.
- Coordinates: 53.02421°N 6.32091°W
- Sovereign state: Ireland
- County: Wicklow

Area
  - Total: 299.91 km^{2} (115.80 sq mi)

Ballinacor North (Irish: Baile na Corra Thuaidh) is a barony in County Wicklow, Ireland.

== Etymology ==
Ballinacor North derives its name from the Ballinacor Castle - from Irish Baile na Corra, town of the weir.

== Location ==
Ballinacor North is located in central County Wicklow, in the Wicklow Mountains.

== History ==
Ballinacor North: the O'Byrne (Ó Broin) sept, originally of Kildare, were centred near here after the 12th century and included the territory of Gabhal Raghnaill. The original Ballinacor barony was divided into north and south in 1798.

== List of settlements ==
Below is a list of settlements in Ballinacor North:

- Rathdrum
