= Paddy Barry =

Paddy Barry may refer to:

- Paddy Barry (Limerick hurler) (1895–1967)
- Paddy Barry (Sarsfield's hurler) (1928–2000)
- Paddy Barry (St Vincent's hurler) (born 1941)
- Paddy Barry (footballer), Irish soccer international

== See also ==
- Patrick Barry (disambiguation)
