= Gerard Byrne =

Gerard Byrne may refer to:

- Gerard Byrne (artist, born 1958), Irish plein air painter and figurative artist
- Gerard Byrne (artist, born 1969), Irish film, video, and photography artist
- Gerard Byrne (actor), Irish actor in TV series such as Fair City

== See also ==
- Gerald G. Byrne (1890–1952), Newfoundland politician
