= Jason Byrne (writer) =

American writer

Jason Byrne is the author of the book Guide to Webcams, originally published by Prompt Publishing in August 2000. Prior to writing the book, Byrne was a reviewer and Technical Director of Government Computer News, a trade publication focusing on IT use in federal, state, and local government. His writings have also appeared in The Washington Post and he has been a guest on a number of programs including The Diane Rehm Show on NPR.

Byrne continues to write, though his focus most recently has been on W3C standard compliant Web design. He has also expanded into graphic design, creating the logos and graphic designs for companies and political campaigns. Currently, he works for the American Registry for Internet Numbers(ARIN), and is married with two children.
