= Shane Byrne =

Shane Byrne is the name of:

- Shane Byrne (co-driver) (born 1992), Irish rally co-driver
- Shane Byrne (footballer) (born 1993), Irish footballer
- Shane Byrne (motorcyclist) (born 1976), British motorcycle road racer
- Shane Byrne (rugby union) (born 1971), former Irish rugby union hooker
