= Repton Boxing Club =

Boxing club in London, England

Repton Boxing Club is a boxing club in Bethnal Green, London, England. The club grew out of Repton Boys Club, which was founded by Repton School, a public school in Derbyshire. Repton Boys Club was set up by the school to help underprivileged young men in east London.

The club is located at 116 Cheshire St, Bethnal Green, London E2 6EG.

The club has produced many notable alumni, including world champions and Olympic gold medallists. Notable ex-members include John H. Stracey, Audley Harrison and Maurice Hope.

== History of the Club ==
The club has been called Britain’s oldest boxing gym and is housed in a corner of a former Victorian Bath House on Cheshire Street, Bethnal Green.

Repton Boxing Club was established by Repton School in 1884 and operated as part youth club, part boxing club. Repton School ceased its involvement in 1971 and the club became solely dedicated to boxing.

Ronald and Reginald Kray, the notorious gangster twins, trained at the club and made donations to it.

The club’s motto is ‘Non Viscara…Non Gloria’ (No Guts...No Glory).

== Notable alumni ==
Repton Boxing Club has produced world champions and Olympic gold medallists.

Notable alumni include John H Stracey, Maurice Hope, Micky Carter, Billy Taylor, Dave Odwell, Graham Moughton, Gary Barker, Sylvester Mitte, Audley Harrison and Tony Cesay.

== Film and music video setting ==
The club is located in a former bathhouse and as such has provided a retro backdrop for many films and music videos over the years.

The boxing gym has played host to artists such as JLS and Plan B who have used the club as a setting for their music videos. The music video for Take That’s first top-ten single, “It Only Takes a Minute” was filmed in the club in 1992.

Director Guy Ritchie has also shot scenes for two of his films inside Repton Boxing Club. Ritchie’s 1998 film Lock, Stock and Two Smoking Barrels features scenes shot inside of the club, as well as his 2019 film The Gentlemen.

== Current club activity ==
Repton Boxing Club was a male-only club for many years, but in recent years have introduced women's classes. As of July 2020, Repton had 12 female boxers who were carded.

Repton Boxing Club is a registered charity.
