= O'Byrne (surname) =

O'Byrne (Irish: Ó Broin) is an Irish surname. The O'Byrne family were descendants of Bran mac Máelmórda, King of Leinster.

Notable people with the surname include:

- Brían F. O'Byrne (b. 1967), Irish actor
- Bryan O'Byrne (1931–2009), American actor
- Cathal O'Byrne (1867–1957), Irish singer, poet and writer
- Charles J. O'Byrne (b. 1959), American lawyer
- David O'Byrne (b. 1969), Australian trade unionist and politician
- Emmett O'Byrne (b. 1973), Irish historian
- Estella Armstrong O'Byrne (1891–1987), American civic leader and anti-communist
- Fergus O'Byrne, Irish-Canadian folk musician
- Fiach McHugh O'Byrne (1534–1597), Gaelic chieftain famed for his resistance to English rule in Ireland
- Felim McFiach O'Byrne (d.1630), Gaelic chieftain
- Gay Byrne (b. 1934), Irish radio and television presenter
- John O'Byrne (1884–1954), Attorney General of the Irish Free State
- Justin O'Byrne (1912–1993), Australian politician
- Michelle O'Byrne (b. 1968), member of the Tasmanian House of Assembly
- Patrick O'Byrne (pianist) (b. 1954), New Zealand pianist
- Patrick O'Byrne (politician) (1870–1944), Irish politician
- Ryan O'Byrne (b. 1984), Canadian ice hockey player
- William O'Byrne (1908–1951), English cricketer
- William Richard O'Byrne (1823–1896), Irish biographer

== See also ==
- O'Byrne Cup, in Gaelic football
- Byrne
