= Alex Byrne =

Alex Byrne may refer to:

- Alex Byrne (Australian footballer) (1904–1975), Australian rules footballer
- Alex Byrne (footballer, born 1933) (died 2020), Scottish footballer
- Alex Byrne (footballer, born 1997), English footballer
- Alex Byrne (philosopher)
