= Sean Byrne =

Sean Byrne may refer to:

== Footballers ==
- Sean Byrne (Irish footballer) (fl. 1920s and 1930s), Irish soccer player
- Sean Byrne (New Zealand footballer) (1955–2003), New Zealand international football player

== Others ==
- Sean Byrne (filmmaker), Australian filmmaker
- Seán Byrne (politician) (1937–2018), Irish Fianna Fáil politician, TD 1982–1987, Senator 1989–1997
- John "Sean" Byrne (1946–2008), Irish-born American musician

== See also ==
- Sean Burns (disambiguation)
- Shaun Byrne (disambiguation)
