= Charlie Byrne (footballer) =

Australian rules footballer

- Byrne in 1916

Personal information
- Full name: Charles Frederick Byrne
- Born: 23 February 1895; Fitzroy, Victoria
- Died: 30 June 1924 (aged 29); East Melbourne, Victoria
- Original team: Preston Juniors
- Height: 173 cm (5 ft 8 in)

Playing career^{1}
Years	Club	Games (Goals)
1916–17	Fitzroy	2 (1)
- ^{1} Playing statistics correct to the end of 1917.

Charles Frederick Byrne (23 February 1895 – 30 June 1924) was an Australian rules footballer who played with Fitzroy in the Victorian Football League (VFL).

His brother Bill also played with him at Fitzroy.
