= Cheshire Street =

Street in east London

Coordinates: 51°31′25″N 0°4′3″W

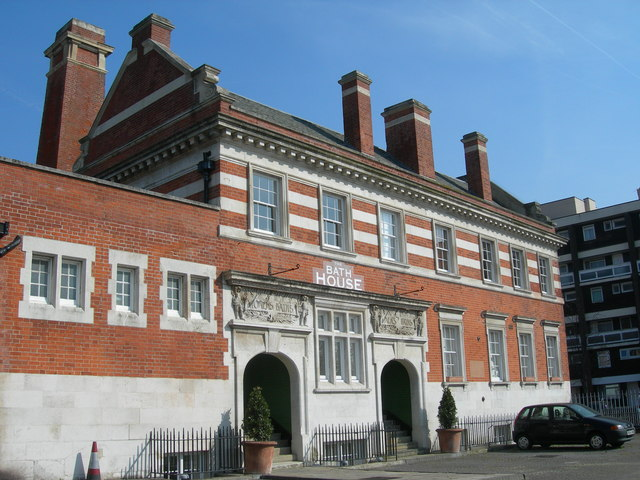
The Bath House in Cheshire Street

Cheshire Street is a street in east London linking Brick Lane with Bethnal Green and Whitechapel.

It has had various names in its history, such as Hare Street, and today forms part of Brick Lane Market on Sundays. The Cheshire Street part of the market is home to various Bric A Brac stalls; prior to the area become popular with artists, the market was a source of basic items (clothes, toys etc.) for working people from the East End.

The street runs parallel to the former Bishopsgate Goods Yard and the main railway track into Liverpool Street and the railway viaduct that used to carry trains into the good yard is one of the oldest brick rail viaducts in the world, the listed Braithwaite Viaduct. It is possible to see the original brick work of this viaduct from Grimsby Street, a tributary of Cheshire Street.

The old Carpenter Arms pub, now re-opened, is also located on Cheshire Street. The notorious Kray twins bought the pub for their mother, who used to hold court in it at weekends. According to the last proprietors of the pub, the Krays installed a bespoke bar surface during the time they owned the pub - the surface employed was allegedly a coffin lid. Reggie Kray's funeral procession went along Cheshire Street in 2000.

The Bath House on Cheshire Street is home to the Repton Boxing Club, London's oldest boxing gym, alma mater to boxers such as Maurice Hope, Billy Walker, and Audley Harrison, and underworld figures such as "Mad" Frankie Fraser and Ray Barton. The bath house equipment was supplied by J J Lane Ltd of Bethnal Green. The Museum of London have one of the original washing machines in their collection which was removed from the wash house prior to the refurbishment.

The Hauser & Wirth Coppermill art gallery on Cheshire Street held several exhibitions between 2005 and 2007, including shows by Martin Kippenberger, Dieter Roth, Christoph Büchel and Martin Creed, before the site was redeveloped.

Author Emanuel Litvinoff grew up on Cheshire Street in the 1920s.

The nearest London Underground stations are Bethnal Green and Whitechapel.
