= Dean Byrne =

Dean Byrne may refer to:

- Dean Byrne (boxer) (born 1984), American-based Irish boxer
- Dean Byrne (rugby league) (born 1981), former rugby league footballer
