= Tinahely =

Village in County Wicklow, Ireland

Tinahely Tigh na hÉille (Irish)
- Village
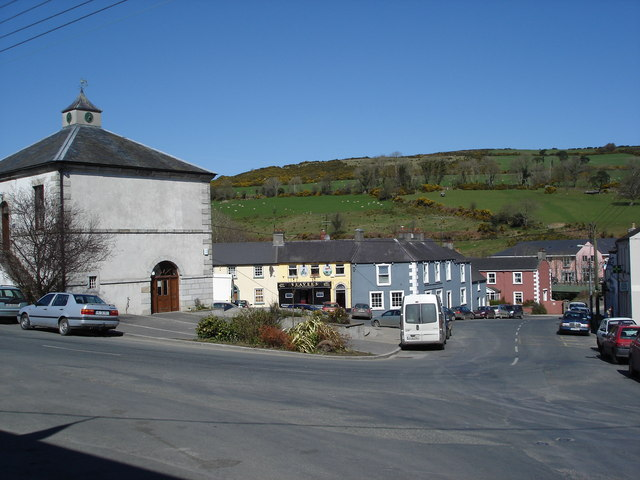
- Dwyer Square (the former Market House, at left, is now a public library)

- Location in Ireland
- Coordinates: 52°48′00″N 6°28′00″W
- Country: Ireland
- Province: Leinster
- County: County Wicklow
- Elevation: 116 m (381 ft)

Population (2016)
  - Total: 937
- Time zone: UTC+0 (WET)
  - Summer (DST): UTC-1 (IST (WEST))
- Irish Grid Reference: T033731

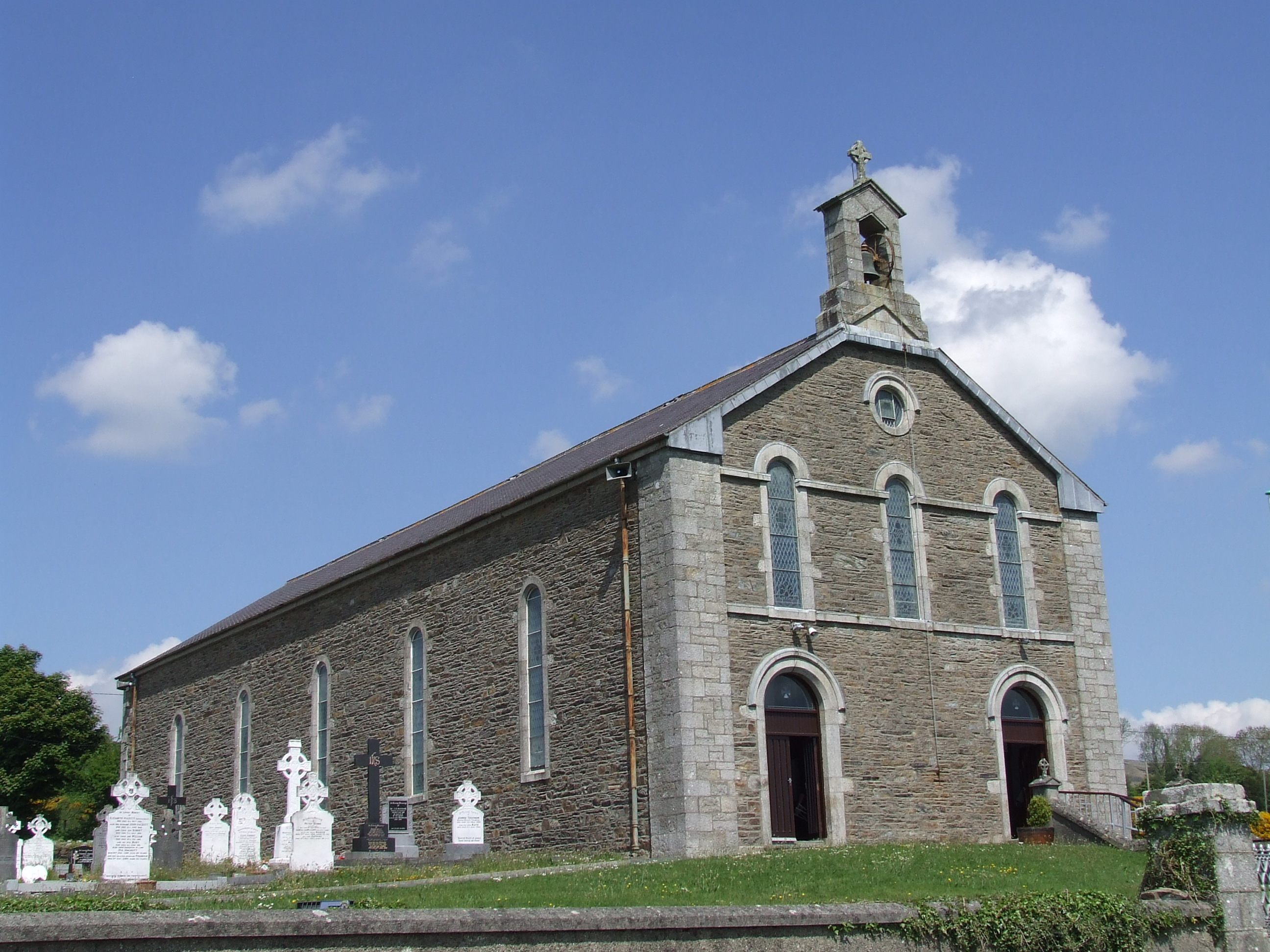
St. Kevin's Church, Kilavaney

Tinahely (Irish: Tigh na hÉille) is a village in County Wicklow in Ireland. It is a market town in the valley of the River Derry, a tributary of the River Slaney.

== Location and access ==
Tinahely is on the R747 road which links the west Wicklow town of Baltinglass with Arklow on the east coast. Arklow is 20 km to the east (27 km by road). The village is near the southern point of the Wicklow Way which winds through the Wicklow Mountains. The River Derry runs through the village.

== History ==
During the medieval period an ancient church was built at Preban near Tinahely, believed to be founded by St. Aidan of Ferns. A holy well in Preban is dedicated to him though it was not listed on ordnance survey maps, being remembered only through oral tradition among the Catholic population. Similarly an ancient church was founded at Kilcommon in the Tinahely area around the 9th century. The modern Anglican church at Kilcommon is believed to now mark the original site.

In 1850 just after the Great Famine the parish priest of Tinahely Fr. Hoare helped many poor people to emigrate from the area to America. They sailed on a ship called the Tirconderoga which arrived in New Orleans. The nearby cemetery of Whitefield near Tinahely purportedly contains the remains of many who died during the famine.

The town of Tinahely is part of the civil parish of Kilcommon in the ancient barony of Ballinacor South. Most of the village dates from the early part of the 19th century as it was rebuilt by Earl Fitzwilliam after it was burnt during the 1798 Rebellion. The Fitzwilliam family lived in nearby Coollattin House. The Coollattin estate once comprised 88,000 acres (360 km^{2}), had 20,000 tenants and occupied almost a quarter of County Wicklow.

=== Parish church ===
Tinahely's parish church, St. Kevin's church, lies 2 km to the east of the village in the townland of Kilaveny overlooking the valley of the Derry stream. The church was erected in 1843 when it replaced another structure located in the adjacent townland of Whitefield which had been burned down on 11 November 1798 by Yeomen soldiers in reprisal for local activity during the 1798 Rebellion. The Whitefield church was replaced by a temporary wooden structure until the erection of St. Kevin's church. The original structure had been erected during the Penal Laws in 1700 and was cruciform in style with two transepts and a nave. Nothing now remains of the original church except for the cemetery that was attached to it. No burials have taken place in the cemetery since the mid-1900s. In the Jubilee Year 2000, parishioners erected a carved commemorative limestone marker on the site of the original church, in the present Whitefield Cemetery, setting out the above history.

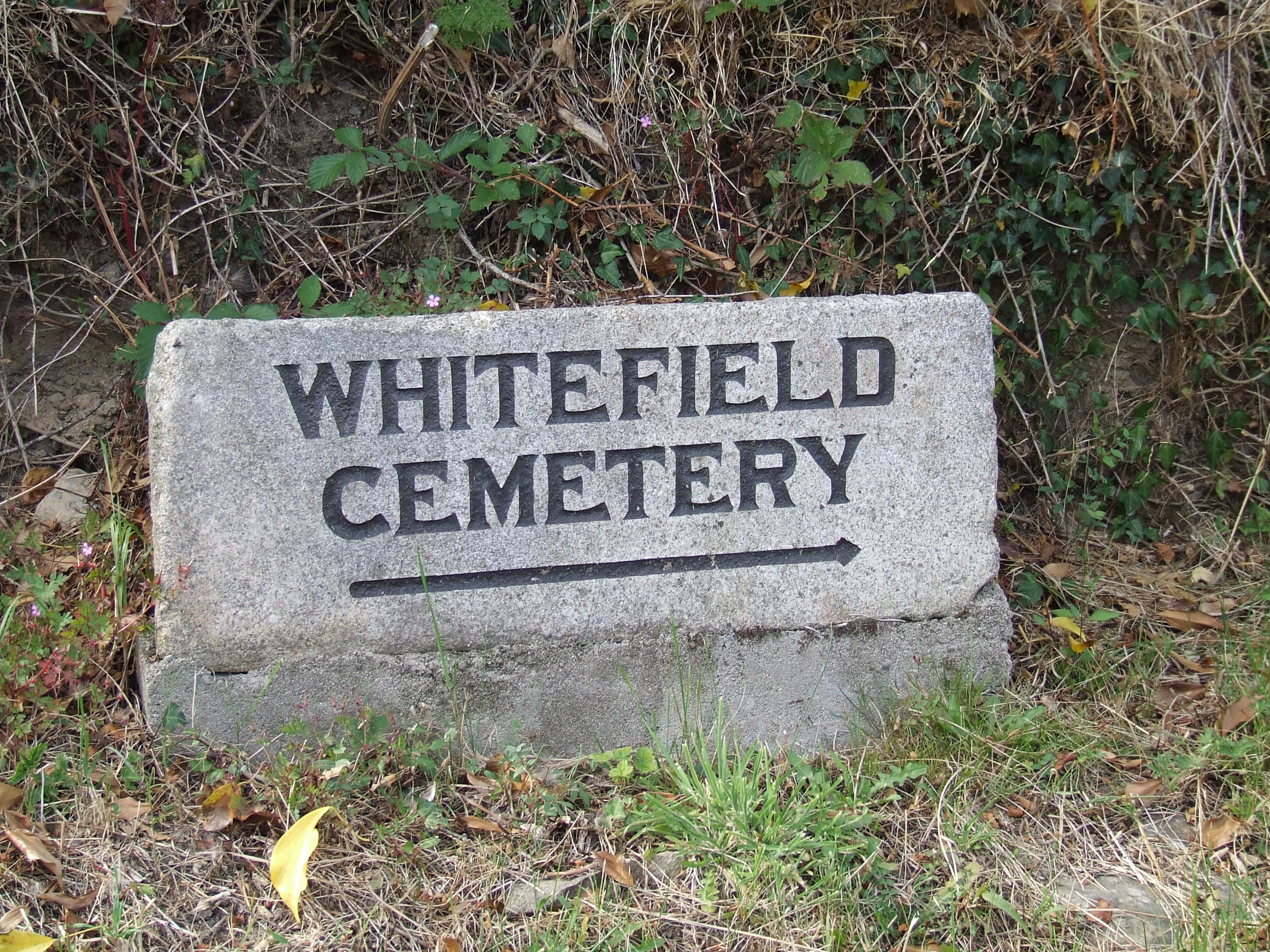
Marker to Whitefield Cemetery, Kilaveny parish

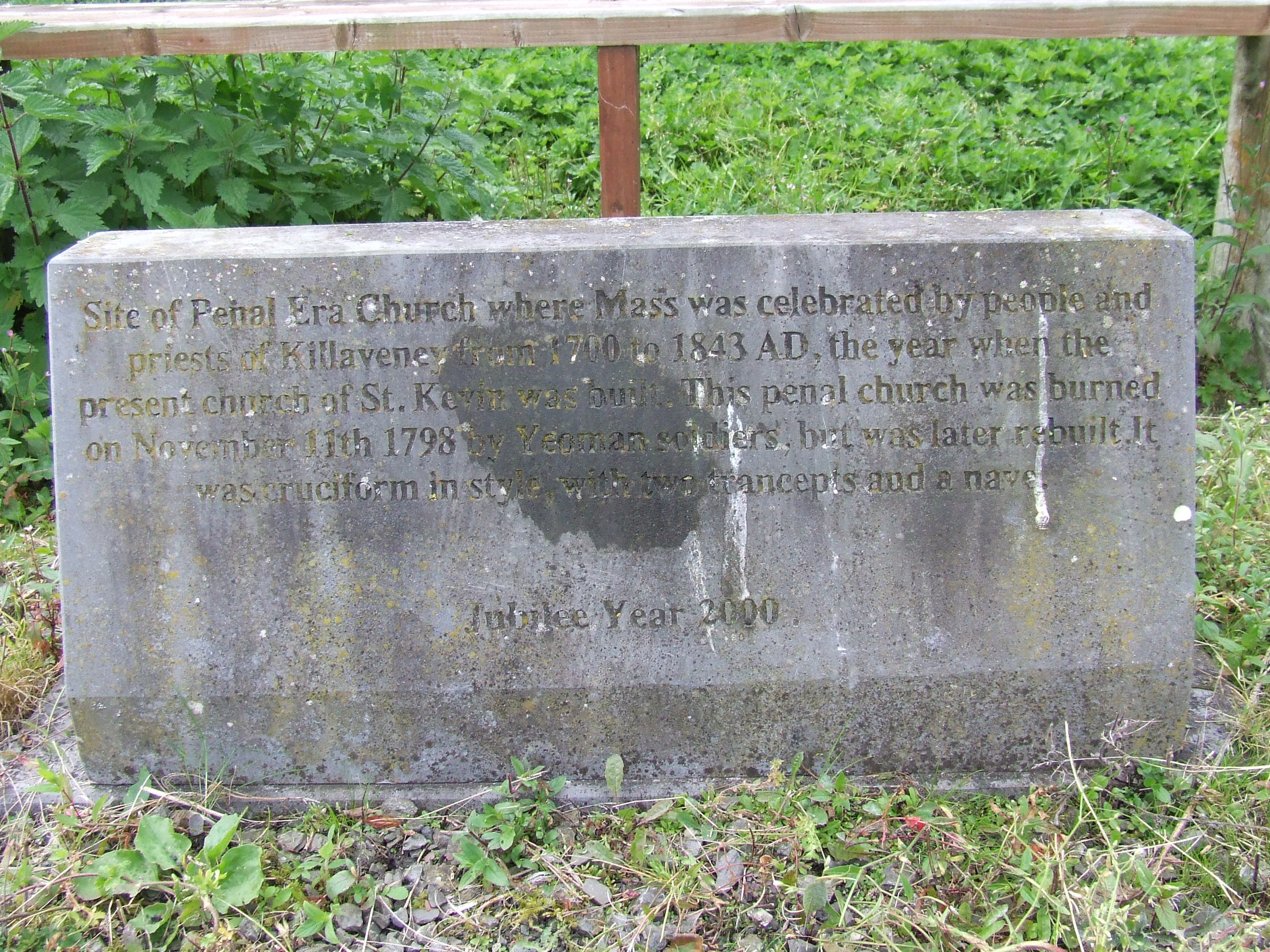
Commemorative marker, Whitefield cemetery with carved history of the original parish church.

== Amenities and events ==
The Courthouse Arts Centre, Dwyer Square, formerly the civil courthouse building hosts musical performances, artist exhibitions, plays and film screenings. The building was restored by a committee of local people with help from FÁS. The local public library, also in Dwyer Square, was formerly the town's market house. There is also a community center located on grounds of original national school on School Road.

Churches in the area include St. Kevin's Church, Kilavaney (Roman Catholic), St. Peter & St. Paul Church, Crossbridge (a Roman Catholic sub-parish of Kilaveney), and Kilcommon Church, Parish of Crosspatrick and Carnew Group (Church of Ireland).

There is a walking route along the line of a former railway which leads from Tinahely to Tomnafinnoge Oak Wood in the nearby town of Shillelagh. Three circular waymarked trails were also opened in 2010, and Tinahely is close to the Wicklow Way, one of Ireland's most popular long-distance trails.

The Tinahely Agricultural Show is a one-day show that takes place annually at Fairwood Park on the first Monday of August (a bank holiday in the Republic of Ireland). The first show was held in 1935.

== Sport ==
Tinahely GAA club was established in 1886. The club plays in St Kevin's Park which opened in May 1978. The club colours are red and white. In 1984 the club became the first club from Wicklow to reach the final of the Leinster Senior Club Football Championship but was beaten by St Vincents GAA.

The local Triathlon club run a Duathlon every year on the Sunday of the May Bank Holiday.

== Transport ==
=== Rail transport ===
Tinahely railway station opened on 22 May 1865, closed for passenger and goods traffic on 24 April 1944 and finally closed altogether on 20 April 1945.

=== Bus transport ===
The Wicklow Way bus service serves Tinahely on a daily basis (must be booked in advance) and links with Dublin trains at Rathdrum railway station. Bus Éireann route 132 (Rosslare Europort - Dublin) serves Tinahely on Thursdays once in each direction linking to Baltinglass, Tallaght, Carnew and Wexford.

== People ==
- Sebastian Barry, playwright, novelist and poet, lives near Tinahely.
- Dermot Troy, lyric tenor, born in Tinahely.
- Noel Vincent Willoughby, former Bishop of Cashel and Ossory, born in Tinahely.

== See also ==
- List of towns and villages in Ireland
- Market Houses in Ireland
