= Hugh Byrne =

Hugh Byrne may refer to:

- Hugh Byrne (Fianna Fáil politician) (born 1943), Irish politician, Fianna Fáil TD and Senator
- Hugh Byrne (Fine Gael politician) (1939–2023), Irish politician, Fine Gael TD for Dublin North West from 1969 to 1982
- Hugh Byrne (rugby league), Australian rugby league footballer who played in the 1920s and 1930s
