= Catherine Byrne =

Catherine Byrne may refer to:

- Catherine Byrne (Irish politician) (born 1956), Irish Fine Gael politician
- Catherine Byrne (Nevada politician) (born 1964), American politician from Nevada
- Catherine Byrne (athlete), 1992 winner of the NCAA Woman of the Year Award
- Catherine Byrne (politician, died 1994) (c.1897–1994), Irish Fine Gael politician
