= Shaun Byrne =

Shaun Byrne is the name of:

- Shaun Byrne (footballer, born 1981), English-born footballer who represented the Republic of Ireland
- Shaun Byrne (footballer, born 1993), Scottish footballer (Dunfermline Athletic, Livingston, Dundee, Raith Rovers)

== See also ==
- Sean Byrne (disambiguation)
