= Beyond Retro =

Vintage clothing retailer

Beyond Retro is a vintage clothing retailer with shops in the UK, Sweden and Finland. The first Beyond Retro store was opened in a disused dairy on Cheshire Street in East London in 2002.

== History ==
The first Beyond Retro store was opened in a disused dairy on Cheshire Street in East London in 2002. A shop, located on Great Marlborough Street, followed in 2006 and in October 2009, another large-scale store in Brighton. The first store in Sweden opened in the district of Södermalm in 2005. Today, there are 2 stores in Stockholm, 2 in Malmö and 2 in Gothenburg, including one "Outlet" in each city.

In 2009 and 2010, Beyond Retro were awarded CoolBrands status and were named number 9 in Time Out's '50 Best Shops of London' in September 2010. In November 2010, an online shop was launched. A further outlet in Dalston opened in 2011. In December, 2011 Beyond Retro was opened in Moscow and also online shop was launched in Russia.

== Product ==
Beyond Retro stores sell vintage clothing from every era of the 20th century. All of the product found in any Beyond Retro store started as a donation to a charity. The sale of these donations to recycling companies generates revenue for charities throughout the Western world. Beyond Retro buys all of its clothing from charities directly, or indirectly through recycling companies. Paloma Faith, Barry Chuckle, Kate Nash, Diana Vickers, Jessie J, Marina & the Diamonds, Giant Haystacks, Carl Barat, and Alexa Chung have worn Beyond Retro clothing.

== Beyond retro design & print archive ==
Beyond Retro are home to an archive resource, offering original vintage fashion print swatches and specialist vintage garments to industry clients.

== In-store activity ==
Live bands play in-store regularly and the company hosts frequent art exhibitions, under the "we saw you coming" banner. In 2010, they curated a three-day music event in their Brighton store, during the Great Escape Festival, in association with So Darn So Records.
