= Anthony Byrne =

Anthony or Tony Byrne is the name of:

- Antony Byrne (born 1969), English actor
- Anthony Byrne (pianist) (born 1958), Irish concert pianist
- Anthony Byrne (politician) (born 1962), Australian politician
- Tony Byrne (boxer) (1930–2013), Irish boxer
- Tony Byrne (footballer, born 1941), Irish footballer for Shamrock Rovers
- Tony Byrne (footballer, born 1946) (1946–2016), Irish footballer of Southampton, Hereford and Newport County
- Tony Byrne, Irish poker player who won the Irish Poker Open in 1984

== See also ==
- Anthony Burns (disambiguation)
