= Kilcommon (County Wicklow civil parish) =

Parish in County Wicklow, Ireland

Kilcommon (Irish: Cill Chomáin, lit. 'the church of Cuimán'), is a civil parish in the ancient barony of Ballinacor South in County Wicklow, Ireland. The parish is centered on the village of Tinahely. It is divided into 28 townlands

== List of townlands ==
The civil parish contains 28 townlands. Today, for local administration purposes, it lies in the county of Wicklow and is administered by Wicklow County Council. Like all civil parishes in Ireland, this civil parish is derived from, and co-extensive with, a pre-existing parish of the Church of Ireland. The core of the parish is centered on the townland and village of Tinahely. The townland at the northern extremity is Kyle; to south it is bounded by the River Derry at Ballyshonog; to the west is the boundary with the barony of Shillelagh at Carrick; to the east lies Ballybeg at the Derry Water.

Name in English	Name in Gaelic
Ballinacor	Baile na Corra Beag
Ballybeg	An Baile Beag
Ballycumber North	Baile an Chomair Thuaidh
Ballycumber South	Baile an Chomair Theas
Ballynamanoge	Baile na mBánóg
Ballyshonog	Baile Sheonac
Bridgeland	Fearann an Droichid
Carrick	An Charraig
Churchland	Cill Chomáin
Coolafunshoge	Cúil na bhFuinseog
Coolross	Cúil Rois
Cross	An Chrois
Curravanish	Corr Mhánais
Farnees	Fearnaigh
Garryhoe	Garraí Mhic Eochú
Glenphilipeen	Gleann Philibín
Knocknaboley	Cnoc na Buaile
Kyle	An Chill
Lugduff	An Log Dubh
Mangans	An Mongán
Mullannaskeagh	Mullán na Sceiche
Mullans North	An Mullán Thuaidh
Mullans South	An Mullán Theas
Muskeagh	Maigh Sciach
Raheenteige	Ráithín Thaidhg
Rosbane	An Ros Bán
Tinahely	Tigh na hÉille
Whitefield	An Gort Bán
Whiterock	Carraig Caltair

== Ecclesiastical parishes ==
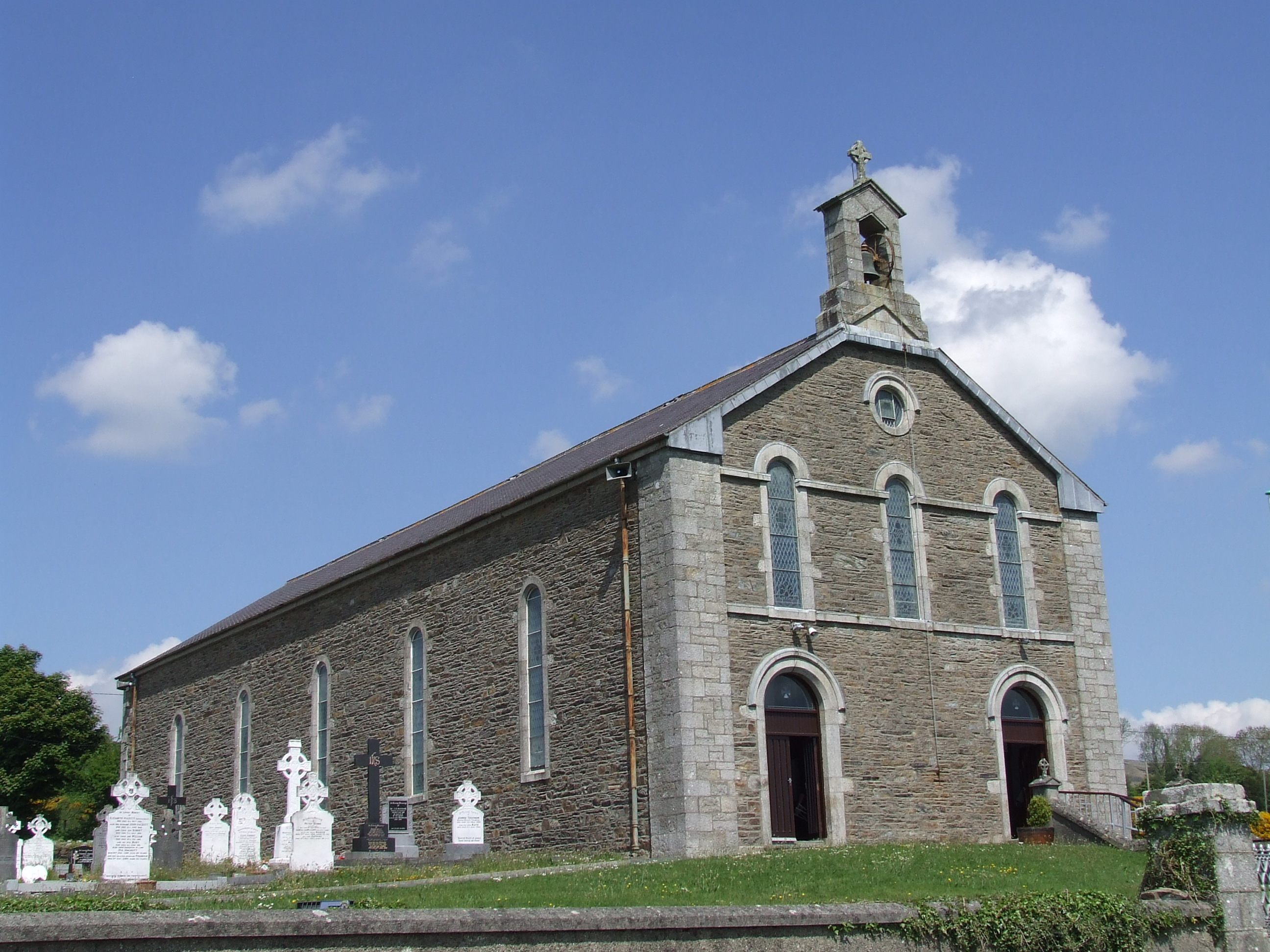
St. Kevin's Kilavaney parish church in the Catholic Church

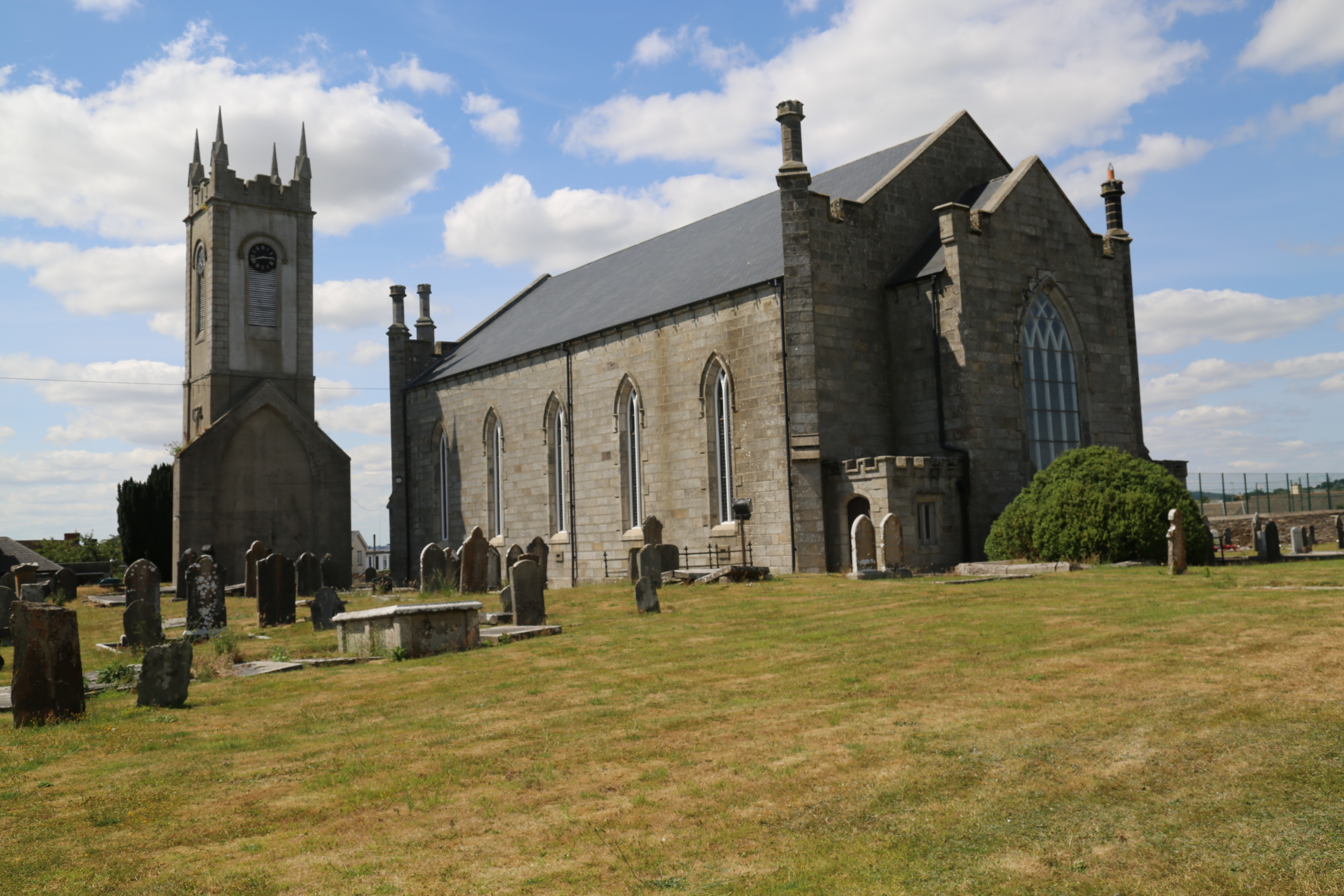
All Saints, Carnew and Tinahely Union in the Church of Ireland

In the Church of Ireland, Kilcommon is today united with three other parishes that were formerly civil parishes in their own right. Today, the "Tinahely Carnew Union" consists of three parishes in the barony of Ballinacor South: Kilcommon, Preban (the church of St John) to the north, Kilpipe to the east of Kilcommon; it also includes the parish of Carnew (the church of All Saints) in the neighbouring barony of the Shilleagh to the south-west. There is an ecclesiastical parish of the Catholic Church in the civil parish called "St Kevin's Parish, Killavaney".
