= Charles C. Byrne =

United States Army general

- Born: May 7, 1837; Baltimore County, Maryland, U.S.
- Died: November 8, 1921 (aged 84)
- Military career
- Allegiance: United States
- Branch: United States Army
- Rank: Brigadier General
- Conflicts: American Civil War

Charles C. Byrne (May 7, 1837 – November 8, 1921) was a brigadier general in the United States Army.

== Biography ==
Byrne was born Charles Christopher Byrne on May 7, 1837, to Charles and Emeline Byrne in Baltimore County, Maryland. He graduated from Mount St. Mary's College in 1856 and obtained a M.D. from the University of Maryland School of Medicine in 1859. Later he took a post-graduate course at the University of Pennsylvania. He married Henrietta P. Colt, a relative of Samuel Colt, in October 1876 in Milwaukee, Wisconsin. Byrne died in 1921. He and Henrietta are both buried at Arlington National Cemetery.

== Career ==
Byrne joined the United States Army as a medical officer in 1860. During the American Civil War Byrne was assigned to the Office of the Surgeon General of the United States Army. Later Byrne was assigned to the Army of the Cumberland and treated wounded soldiers during battles including the Battle of Chickamauga, the Battle of Missionary Ridge, the Atlanta campaign, and the Battle of Nashville. Following the war his assignments included being stationed at Fort Snelling and serving as attending surgeon of the United States Soldiers' Home.
