= Kevin Byrne (educator) =

Irish educator (1931–2014)

Byrne in 1991.

Louis Byrne (24 May 1931 – 26 September 2014), better known under the religious name Brother Kevin Alfred Byrne, was a prominent Irish educator who served as the principal of St. Joseph's Institution in Singapore.

== Early life and education ==
Byrne was born to a family of farmers at the Ballyknocken House in the village of Glenealy in County Wicklow, Ireland on 24 May 1931. He received his early education there before leaving to study at the De La Salle College boarding school in Castletown. There, he grew up with Felix Donohue, who would go on to become a prominent educator in Malaysia. He joined the De La Salle Brothers and achieved Senior Novitiate on 7 July 1947, taking his first vows on 8 September 1948. He trained as a teacher at the Inglewood Scholasticate in Kintbury from 9 September 1948 and at the Strawberry Hill Scholasticate in Strawberry Hill, London from 1 September 1950. He was among the few in the order to volunteer to be sent out to East Asia, as he was "young and adventurous".

== Career ==
Byrne was first posted to the St. John's Institution in Kuala Lumpur, starting as a teacher there on 16 November 1952. He proved popular with the students there. He returned to Ireland in 1958 and studied for a degree at the University College Dublin. After graduating from the university, he returned to St. John's in August 1961. In January 1966, he was transferred to the St. Xavier's Institution in Penang. He was again transferred in October 1971 to St. Anthony's School in Teluk Intan, Perak.

Byrne was posted to the St. Joseph's Institution (SJI) in Singapore in October 1977. The school was then still located at the premises on Bras Basah Road. He began as a Secondary Four English and Literature teacher before he was made the school's principal the following year. Students remembered him as approachable despite "not say[ing] very much]". According to the Irish Independent, Byrne was an "inspired leader" who "led an enthusiastic staff." He oversaw the school's relocation from its cramped and noisy former premises, which it had long outgrown, to its new campus on Malcolm Road near Catholic Junior College. The school moved in 1988. He also oversaw the school's move to becoming an independent school from January in that year. The school's board of governors selected Byrne to continue as principal, a role that now involved serving as a sort of "chief executive" to the school, after "careful thought and consideration". Brother Joseph Kiely, who was previously the principal of SJI, and Rudy Mosbergen were selected to serve as Byrne's deputy principals.

In June 1991, it was announced that Byrne would be retiring from SJI at the end of the 1991 school year. He was to be succeeded in this position by Brother Paul Rogers. At the farewell Mass held at the school hall in November, he named the school's relocation and it going independent as his achievements as principal. He then left on a short break to Ireland before returning to Singapore to counsel and teach at the local Christian Brothers schools part-time.

In 1992, he started teaching at the Saint Patrick's School, Singapore, where he remained for half a decade before retiring to Ireland. He then served at the Mount La Salle in Ballyfermot. He worked with the Society of Saint Vincent de Paul in adult education.

== Personal life and death ==
Teacher Maureen Pestana described Byrne as a "gentle giant". In 2009, he began residing at the Miguel House nursing home in Castletown, where he spent his last years. He began suffering from Alzheimer's disease and had a "bad fall" in 2014. He died on 26 September.
