= Kevin P. Byrne =

US Navy officer

Rear Admiral Kevin P. Byrne
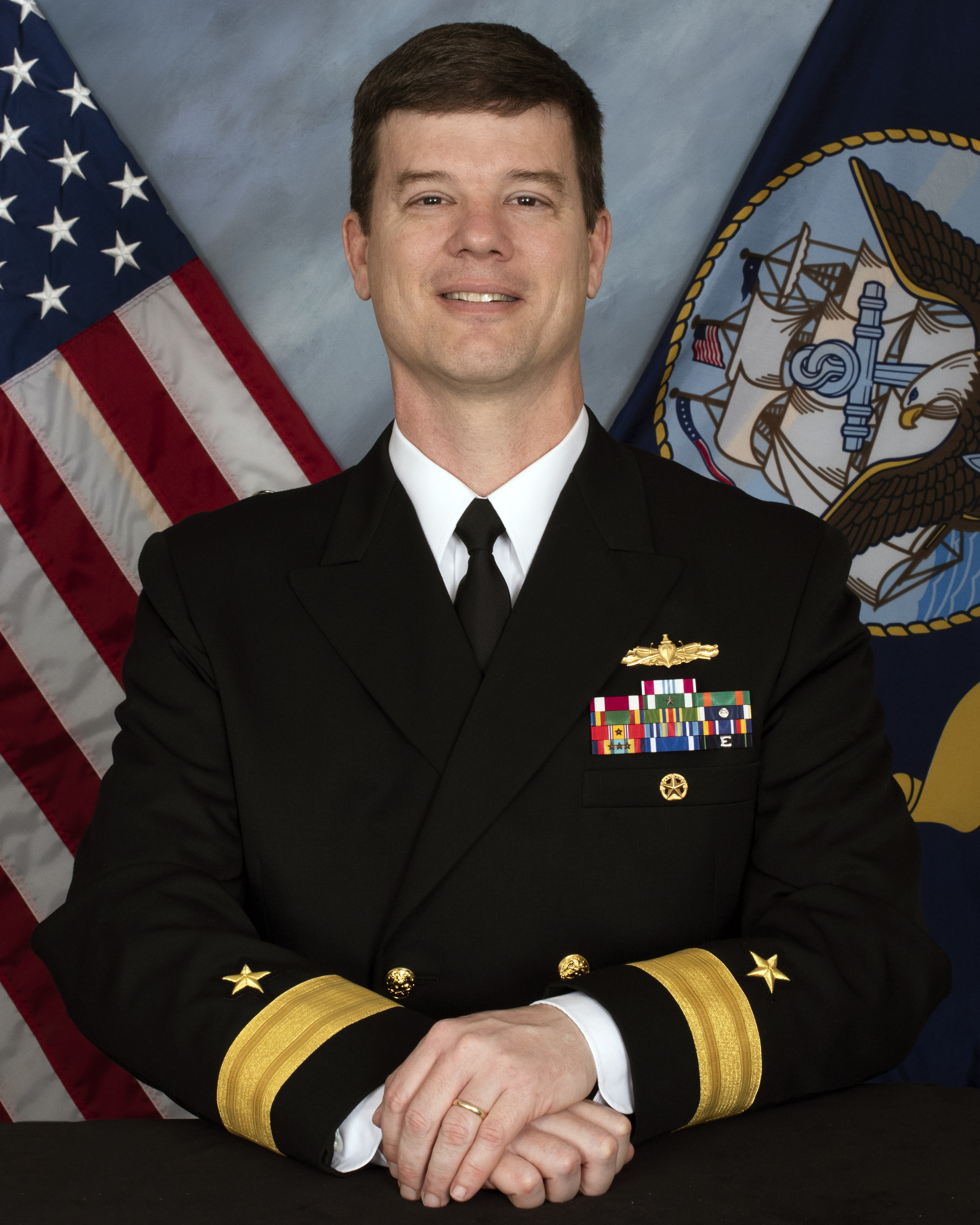
- Rear Admiral Kevin P. Byrne, USN, c. 2020
- Education: United States Naval Academy (BS); Naval Postgraduate School (MS)
- Military career
- Allegiance: United States of America
- Branch: United States Navy
- Service years: 1993-present
- Rank: Rear admiral (lower half)
- Commands: Naval Surface Warfare Center; Naval Undersea Warfare Center; USS Barry (DDG-52)
- Awards: Defense Meritorious Service Medal; Meritorious Service Medal (2); Navy and Marine Corps Commendation Medal (5); Navy and Marine Corps Achievement Medal

Rear Admiral Kevin P. Byrne is an active duty United States Navy officer and career surface warfare officer who has been serving as Commander, Naval Surface Warfare Center (NSWC) and Naval Undersea Warfare Center (NUWC) since April 20, 2020.

== Life and career ==
Byrne is a native of St. Louis, Missouri. He attended the U.S. Naval Academy in Annapolis, Maryland, graduating with a Bachelor of Science in 1993. He attended the Naval Postgraduate School in Monterey, California, graduating in 1999 with Master of Science in Operations Research.

At sea, Byrne served as commanding officer and executive officer of USS Barry (DDG-52). He also served as executive officer, and combat systems and weapons officer aboard USS Cape St. George (CG-71). He completed his initial sea tours as operations officer aboard USS Defender (MCM-2) and navigator aboard USS Mount Whitney (LCC-20).

Ashore, he served as major program manager (MPM) for Surface Ship Modernization for Naval Sea Systems Command (NAVSEA) Surface Directorate (SEA 21). In this position, he was responsible for the modernization of nine ship classes. Previously, Byrne served as the fleet introduction program manager for Aegis Ashore in Aegis Combat System in the Program Executive Office for Integrated Warfare Systems (PEO IWS 1.0) and flag aide to Commander, NAVSEA. Byrne's Pentagon tour includes as an analyst for the Director of Program and Evaluation (PA&E) with the Office of the Secretary of Defense.

Byrne assumed duties as the commander, Naval Surface Warfare Center (NSWC) and Naval Undersea Warfare Center (NUWC) on April 20, 2020. As the commander of these units, he leads more than 27,000 scientists, engineers, technicians and support personnel, both civilian and active duty, at eight Surface Warfare Divisions and two Undersea Warfare Divisions. The NAVSEA Warfare Centers provide research, development, test and evaluation for the future Navy as well as in-service engineering and logistics support for the operational naval forces.
