= Thomas Byrne =

Thomas Byrne may refer to:

- Thomas Byrne (cricketer) (1866–1951), Australian cricketer
- Thomas Byrne (Dublin politician) (1917–1978), Irish politician
- Thomas Byrne (Meath politician) (born 1977), Irish politician
- Thomas Byrne (VC) (1866–1944), Irish British Army soldier
- Thomas Byrne (Virginia politician), member of the Virginia House of Delegates
- Thomas R. Byrne (1923–2009), American politician
- Thomas Ryan Byrne (1923–2014), American diplomat
- Thomas Byrne, co-founder of SA Hauts-Fourneaux de Rodange in 1872
- Thomas Joseph Byrne, English architect
- Thomas Sebastian Byrne (1841–1923), American Roman Catholic bishop

== See also ==
- Tommy Byrne (disambiguation)
- Thomas Byrnes (disambiguation)
