= Bachrach Studios =

American photographic studio

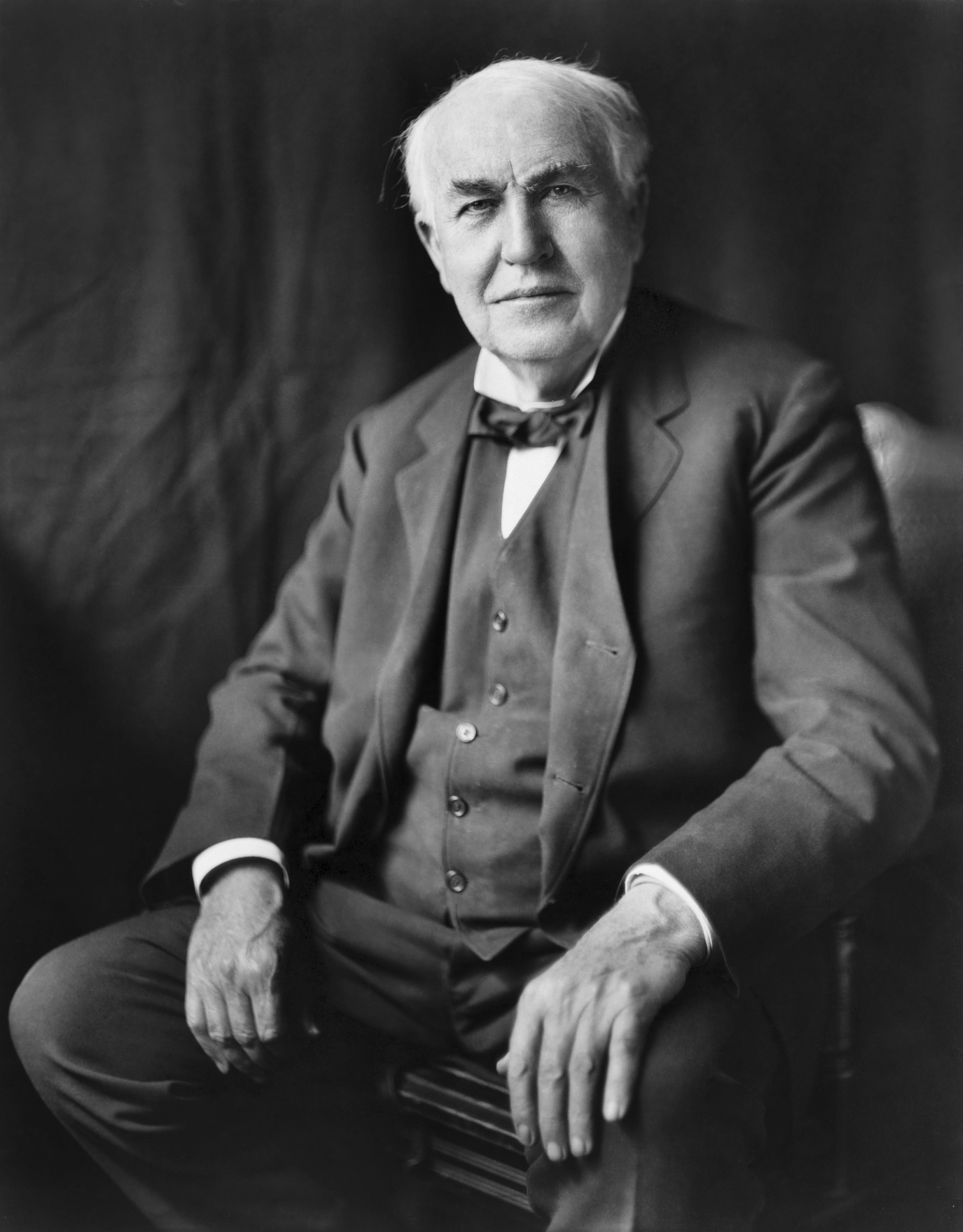
Bachrach's 1922 portrait of Thomas Edison (restored version)

Bachrach Studios is an American photographic studio, believed to be one of the oldest continuously operating photography studios in the world. The studio is known for its formal portraits, which draw upon classical painting techniques. With a focus on portraits of distinguished individuals, the studio has made formal portraits of almost every American president since Andrew Johnson.

David Bachrach, Jr. founded the studio in 1868. His descendants—Louis Fabian Bachrach, Sr., Louis Fabian Bachrach, Jr., and Louis Fabian Bachrach III—managed the studio and acted as chief photographers. In 2021, the firm was acquired by two employees, who also manage the firm's photographic catalog in Loudoun County, Virginia.

== History ==
The studio's founder, David Bachrach, Jr., began taking photographs during the Civil War for Harper's Weekly. He took the only photo, albeit blurry and indistinct, of Abraham Lincoln's Gettysburg Address.

Bachrach opened a studio in Baltimore in 1868 using. He secured permission to photograph Lincoln's successor, Andrew Johnson. The studio has photographed every US president since then, its founder having made it a goal to photograph all the important people he could. He sought and received permission to photograph such notables as Charles Lindbergh and Calvin Coolidge. The studio went on to produce portraits of Albert Einstein, Thomas Edison, Henry Ford, Eleanor Roosevelt, Douglas Dobson, and Muhammad Ali, among others.

In 1919, the company hired Paul Gittings, who opened and managed Bachrach Studios in Texas. Crete Hutchinson was managing the Washington, D.C. studio in the 1920s. Bachrach Studio had forty-eight locations throughout the United States at its height in 1929. During the Great Depression, Bachrach scaled down the company and sold the Texas studios to Gittings.

Bachrach Studios remains a family business as of 2024.

== See also ==
- Louis Fabian Bachrach, Jr.
