= Mabel Edna Gillespie =

American labor activist (1877-1923)

- Gillespie, from a 1910 publication
- Born: May 4, 1877; Saint Paul, Minnesota, U.S.
- Died: September 24, 1923 (aged 46); Boston, Massachusetts, U.S.
- Occupations: Labor reformer, settlement worker

Mabel Edna Gillespie (May 4, 1877 – September 24, 1923) was an American labor reformer and state official in Massachusetts. She was executive secretary of the Boston Women's Trade Union League from 1909 to 1923, and served on the state's Minimum Wage Commission from 1913 to 1919.

== Early life and education ==
Gillespie was born in Saint Paul, Minnesota, the daughter of James Gillespie and Ida Scott Gillespie. She was raised by an aunt in Concord, Massachusetts. She graduated from high school in Concord in 1897, and attended Radcliffe College from 1898 to 1900.

== Career ==
After Radcliffe College, Gillespie worked with Helena Dudley as a settlement worker at Denison House in Boston. She was active in the Women's Trade Union League (WTUL). From 1904 to 1909 she was executive secretary of the New York Consumers' League branch in Buffalo, New York. Her investigations of labor practices involved undercover experiences. She worked in a Buffalo cannery for four months, and she found a job as a health inspector to document child labor violations in Buffalo stores.

Gillespie, as photographed by Bachrach

From 1909 to 1923, Gillespie was executive secretary of the Boston Women's Trade Union League. She was also a member of the national executive board of the WTUL. She helped organize unions in Boston, and worked with other labor organizations in the city. She was arrested for handing leaflets to workers at a razor factory in 1910. She supported the 1912 Lawrence textile strike, and when it succeeded she was appointed to chair the state's new Minimum Wage Commission. In 1913 she went to England for two months, to study women's working conditions in Birmingham.

She became first president of the Boston Stenographers' Union, and was the first woman to serve on the executive board of the Massachusetts Federation of Labor. During World War I she served on the Women's Committee on Industry. After the war she was an advisor to the Bryn Mawr Summer School for Women Workers and helped establish the Boston Trade Union College. She was nominated for the presidency of the Massachusetts A. F. of L. in 1921.

== Death ==
Gillespie died from heart failure in 1923, at the age of 46, at her workplace in Boston.
