= Henry Albert Harper =

Canadian journalist (1873 –1901)

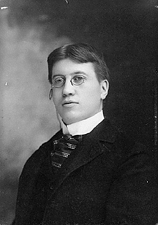
- Born: December 9, 1873; Cookstown, Ontario, Canada
- Died: December 6, 1901 (aged 27); Ottawa, Ontario, Canada
- Education: University of Toronto
- Occupations: journalist, civil servant

Henry Albert Harper (December 9, 1873 – December 6, 1901) was a Canadian journalist and civil servant. He may be best known as a friend of future Prime Minister William Lyon Mackenzie King. Harper is commemorated by a statue on Parliament Hill after his death while trying to save someone from drowning.

Born to Henry and Margaret-Ann Harper in Cookstown, Ontario, Harper moved with his family to Barrie in 1880, where he graduated from Barrie Central Collegiate Institute eleven years later. He attended the University of Toronto, where he befriended Mackenzie King, who was a fellow student. After completing his Honours degree in political science in 1895, Harper became a journalist in London and Toronto, before eventually becoming the Ottawa correspondent for the Montreal Daily Herald.

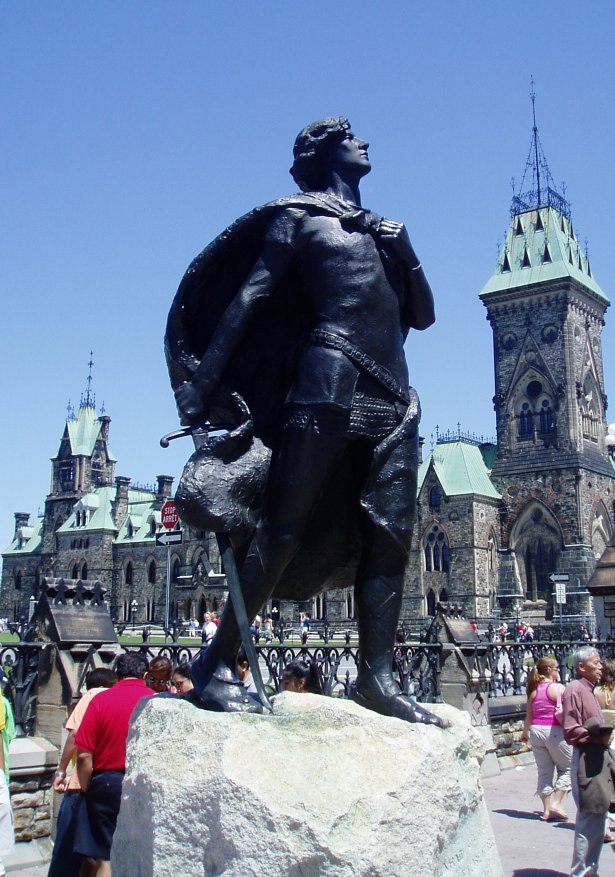
The statue of Sir Galahad in honour of Harper

In Ottawa, Harper shared an apartment with Mackenzie King, who was then leading the effort to establish the new Department of Labour under the government of Wilfrid Laurier. In 1900 Harper resigned from the Herald, to work for Mackenzie King as the assistant editor of the Labour Gazette, the Department's main publication.

On December 6, 1901, Harper was attending a skating party held on the frozen Ottawa River by the governor general, the Earl of Minto. Bessie Blair – the daughter of Andrew George Blair – and Alex Creelman fell through a patch of weak ice. While Creelman pulled himself to safety, Harper dove into the river to save Blair, and both ultimately drowned. His last words were reportedly "What else can I do?", in reply to his companions who tried to dissuade him from a rescue attempt, while another telling says that he quoted Galahad's famous "If I lose myself, I save myself" before jumping into the water. Their bodies were recovered the following day and Harper was buried in Cookstown on December 9.

Mackenzie King was deeply affected by his friend's death, and arranged to become head of the government committee charged with finding some way to honour his sacrifice. Both Mackenzie King and Harper had been fond of Tennyson's Arthurian works, and Mackenzie King decided that Harper would be honoured by a statue of Sir Galahad outside the parliament buildings, with the quote cut into the stone base. Sculptor Ernest Wise Keyser was commissioned and the statue was unveiled in 1905. It remains in place today, in one of the most prominent locations in the city just in front of the main entrance to Parliament Hill. It is the only statue not portraying a politician or monarch.

In 1906, Mackenzie King published a book The Secret of Heroism about his friend whom he recalled in his diary entries as "the man I loved as I have loved no other man, my father and brother alone excepted". In 1909, King's first speech before the House of Commons was preceded by the statement that he marked the eighth anniversary of Harper's sacrifice by placing ten white roses on the base of the statue.

His diaries, memos and correspondence with King are kept in the National Archives of Canada.

Henry Harper is buried in the Harper family plot at the Old Presbyterian Cemetery at Wilson's Hill, located about two miles south of Cookstown. There is a memorial plaque to his memory in St. Andrew's Presbyterian Church in Barrie, Ontario.

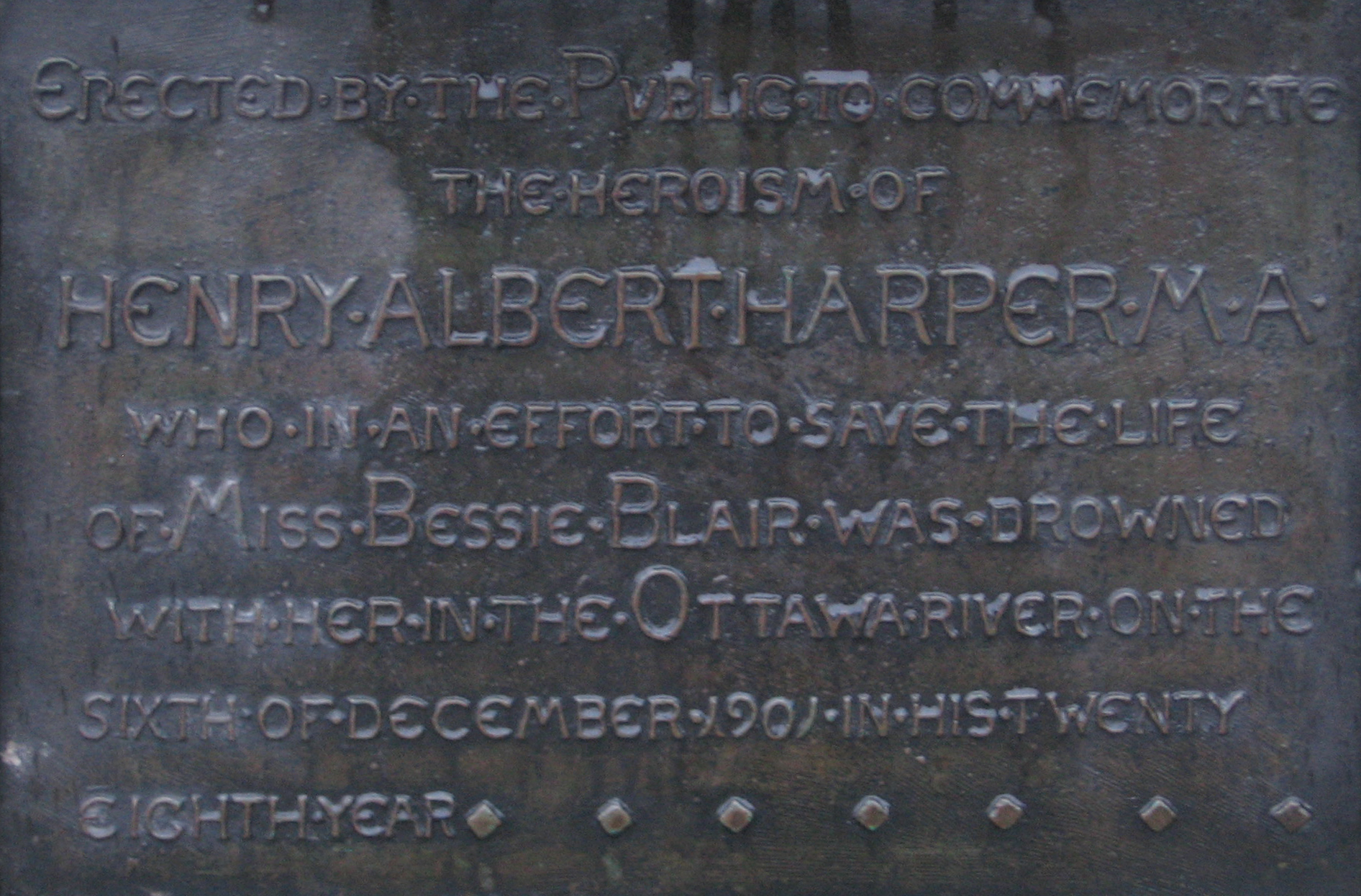
The plaque on the Galahad statue

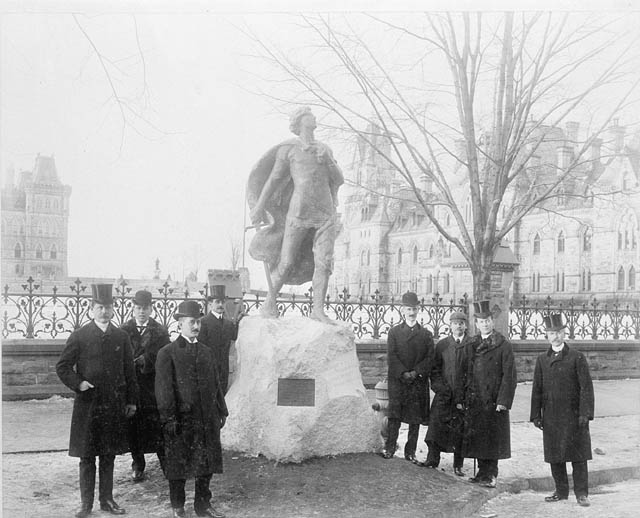
Mackenzie King at the unveiling of the statue.

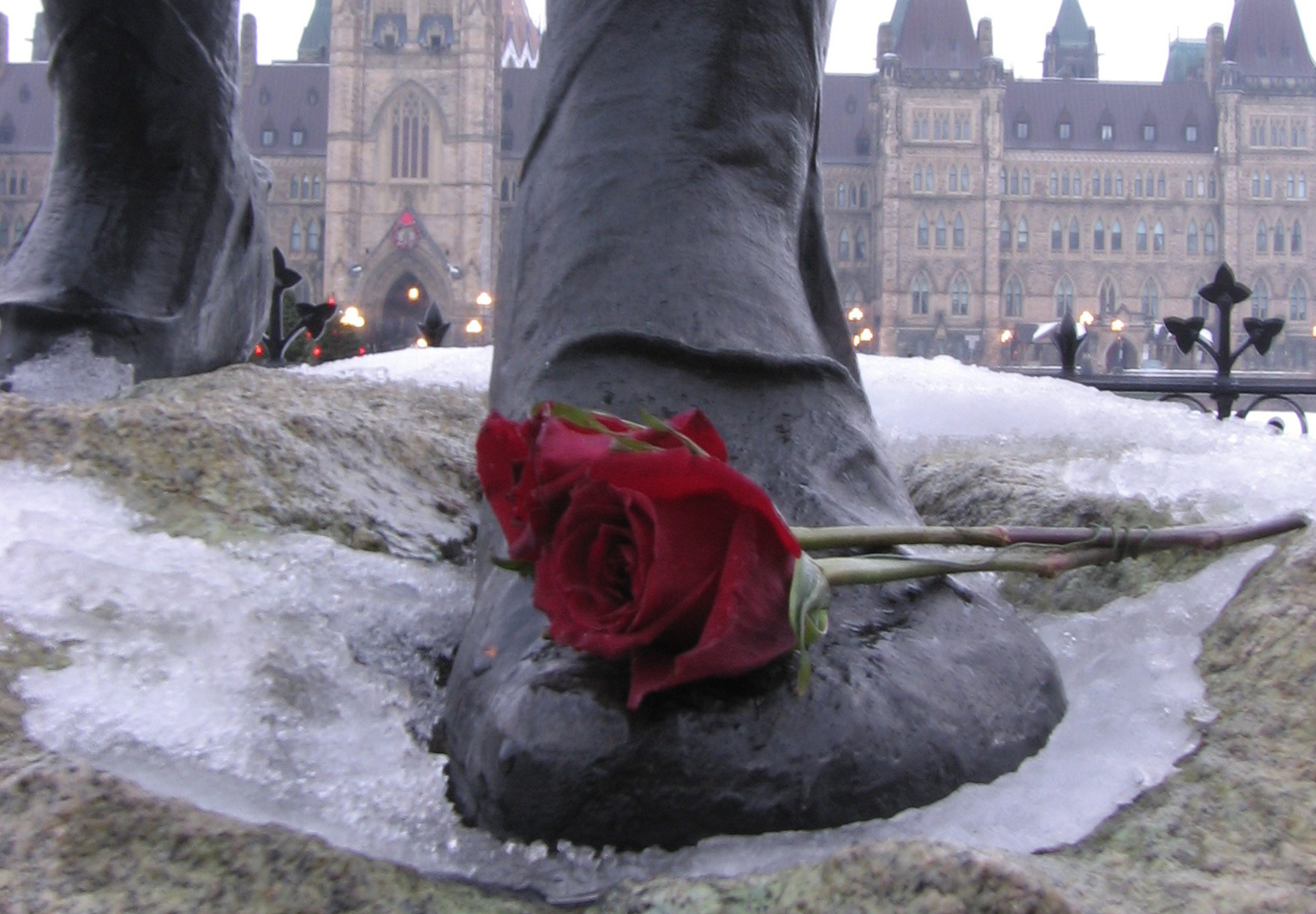
A rose left by a passerby
