= Ephraim Keyser =

American sculptor

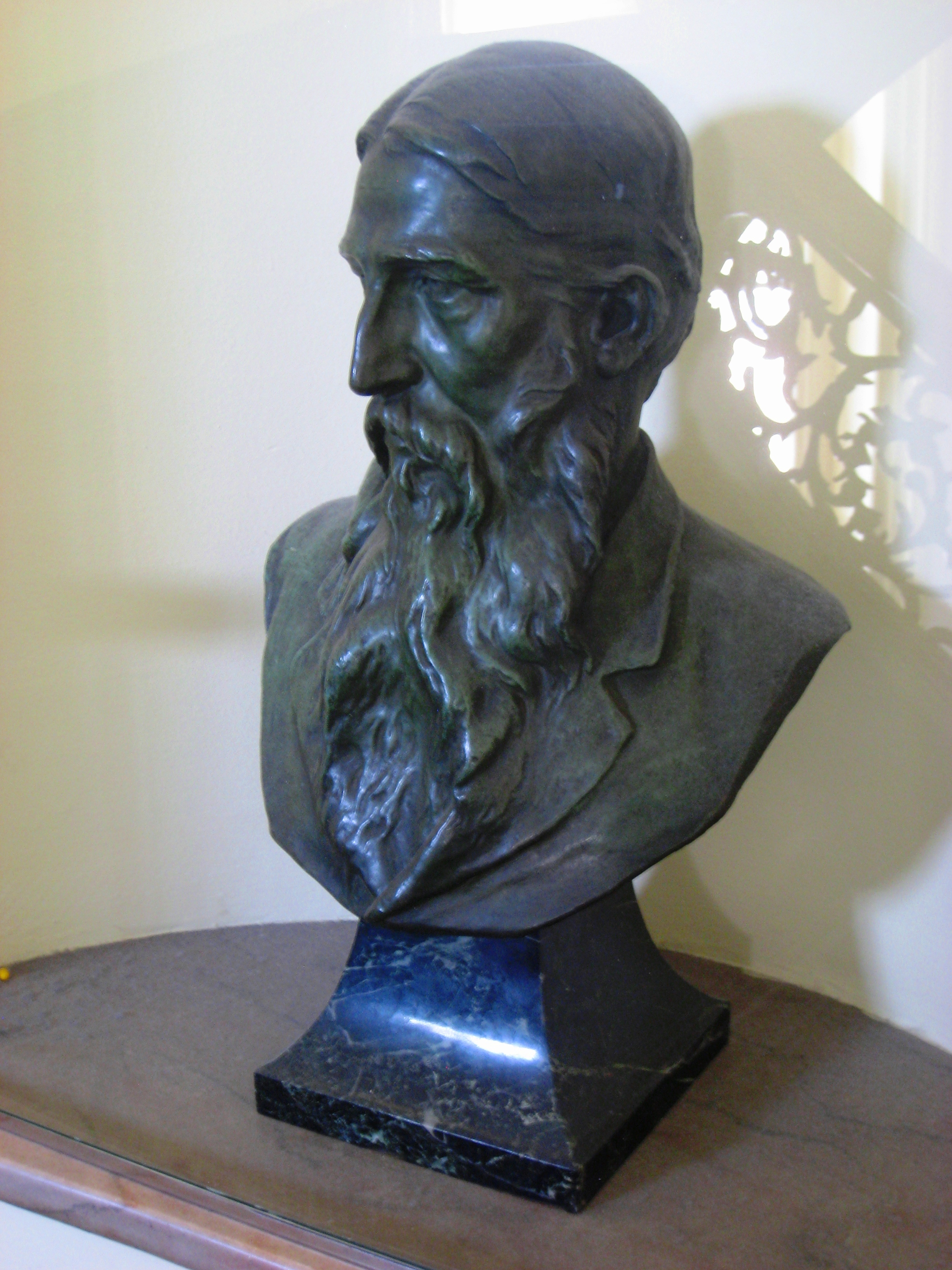
Bust of poet Sidney Lanier, by Ephraim Keyser

Ephraim Keyser (October 6, 1850 in Baltimore, Maryland – January 26, 1937) was an American sculptor.

== Biography ==
He was educated at the City College of Baltimore and studied art in the Maryland Academy of Arts in 1871-72. He went to Munich in 1872 and studied under Widmann in the Academy of Fine Arts, where he won a silver medal for a bronze statue of a page. He remained there until 1876, when he moved to Berlin, and entered the studio of Albert Wolff, under whose guidance he modeled a figure of Psyche, for which he gained the Michael Beer prize, enabling him to spend a year in Italy.

In 1880 he settled in Rome, Italy, where he maintained a studio for six years and where he received a prize for the statue of Psyche. In 1887 he returned to the United States, and lived in New York City until 1893. He then resided in Baltimore, where he became an instructor in modeling at the School of Fine Arts. His studio was located at the David Bachrach House, listed on the National Register of Historic Places in 1985.

His nephew, Ernest Wise Keyser, was also a sculptor.

== Works ==
Among his works may be mentioned: the statue of General de Kalb, erected by the government at Annapolis, Maryland; the design for the tomb of Chester A. Arthur, President of the United States, at Albany, New York; and various busts, among them those of President Grover Cleveland, Cardinal Gibbons, Sidney Lanier, and Henry Harland.
