= Gittings Studios =

Gittings Studios is a photographic studio founded in 1928 by Paul Gittings, Sr.. Gittings bought the Bachrach Studios in the southern region of the United States during the Great Depression. The Gittings laboratory was a pioneer of color dye transfer prints. In the 1960s, the Gittings laboratories were the first to use machines from Kodak that would develop into the "one hour processing." Due to this progress, the Gittings laboratory lost a substantial portion of its market in the professional color film processing industry.

Paul Linwood Gittings, Sr. was instrumental in organizing, funding and establishing the International Photography Hall of Fame and Museum in Oklahoma City, Oklahoma.

In the 1950s and 1960s, Mr. Gittings also operated a studio within Neiman Marcus.

In his autobiography entitled Color Portraiture, he writes, "The photographer doesn't sell photographs; he sells sentiment and flattery. From the day that he [the photographer] understands the philosophy of the product he sells and bends his efforts to that end alone, he will prosper." and "Finally, if I could choose those words of wisdom which have served me best, during a long photographic lifetime, I would mention first: 'The only difference between the difficult and the impossible is that the impossible takes more time.' Sometimes the hundredth attempt is the one that brings success." The company has trained and inspired generations of portrait photographers. The organization was sold in 1987 to Paul Skipworth, then again in 1998 to Greg Lorfing. Under Lorfing's direction, Gittings has worked in 15 countries in Europe, Asia and the Middle East, gaining worldwide recognition as a leading studio for legal portraiture.

== Citations ==
- CHRISS, CATHERINE (1990-10-06). "'All I want to do is preserve who I am'". Houston Chronicle.
- Crofford, Ava (1988-08-02). "The Diamond Years of Texas Photography". The Dallas Morning News.
- Lemann, Nicholas (1988-08-02). "The Gittings People". Texas Monthly.
- Gittings, Paul (1979). "Direct Color Portraiture". Houston, Texas: Gulf publishing.
