= Alexander Bliss =

United States Army officer (1827–1896)

- Born: December 29, 1827
- Died: April 30, 1896 (aged 68)
- Military career
- Allegiance: United States
- Branch: Union army
- Rank: Colonel
- Conflicts: American Civil War

Alexander Bliss (29 December 1827 – 30 April 1896) was assistant quartermaster general of the Union forces and a colonel in the United States Army during the American Civil War. His father, also named Alexander, died before he was born; and his mother, Elizabeth Davis Bliss, later married George Bancroft, the eminent American historian.

On Colonel Bliss's behalf, Bancroft asked President Abraham Lincoln for a copy of the Gettysburg Address, as Bliss was a member of a committee gathering manuscripts to be collected in the work Autographed Leaves of Our Country's Authors, which was intended for sale to raise money for charitable assistance to Civil War veterans. The resulting copy of Lincoln's speech, known as the Bliss Copy, is one of only five known manuscript versions of the Gettysburg Address; it is preserved and on display in the Lincoln Bedroom of the White House in Washington, D.C.
