= David Bachrach House =

Historic house in Maryland, United States

- U.S. National Register of Historic Places
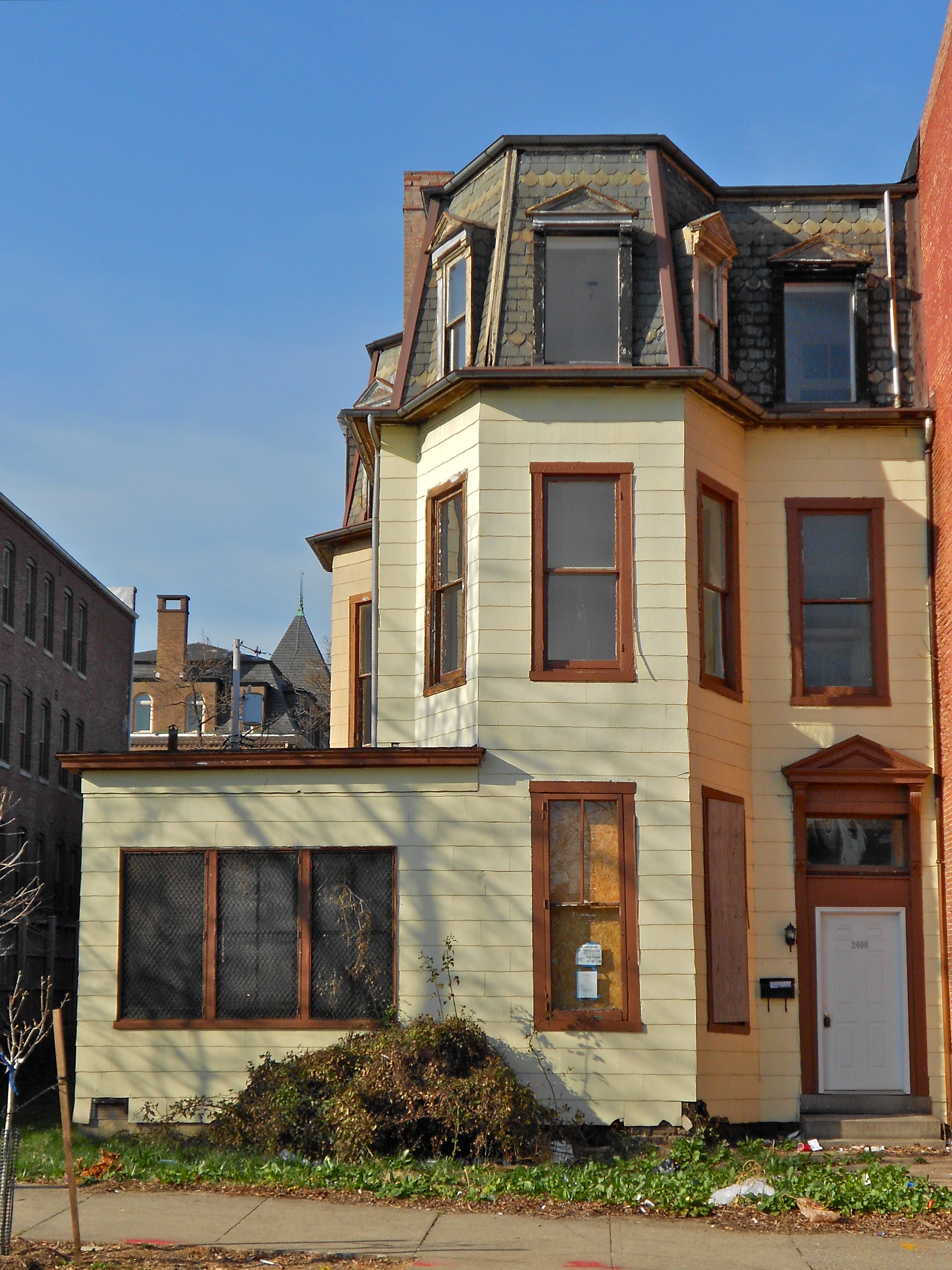
- David Bachrach House, March 2012

- Location within Baltimore Location within Maryland Location within the United States
- Location: 2406-2408 Linden Ave., Baltimore, Maryland
- Coordinates: 39°18′50.6″N 76°38′9.5″W
- Area: less than one acre
- Built: 1886
- Architectural style: Gothic
- NRHP reference No.: 85001947
- Added to NRHP: September 5, 1985

The David Bachrach House, also known as Gertrude Stein House, is a historic home located at Baltimore, Maryland, United States. It is a late 19th-century Victorian style frame structure consisting of two stories plus a mansard roof in height. It was constructed about 1886 and occupied by David Bachrach (1845-1921), a commercial photographer who figures prominently in the annals of American photographic history. Also on the property is a one-story brick building on a high foundation that was built for Ephraim Keyser (1850-1937) as a sculpture studio about 1890 and a one-story brick stable. Ephraim Keyser and Fannie (Keyser) Bachrach were brother and sister. Gertrude Stein (1874-1946) was a niece of Mrs. David Bachrach [Fannie (Keyser) Bachrach] and lived in this house for a short time in 1892.

The David Bachrach House was listed on the National Register of Historic Places in 1985.
