= Ernest Wise Keyser =

American sculptor

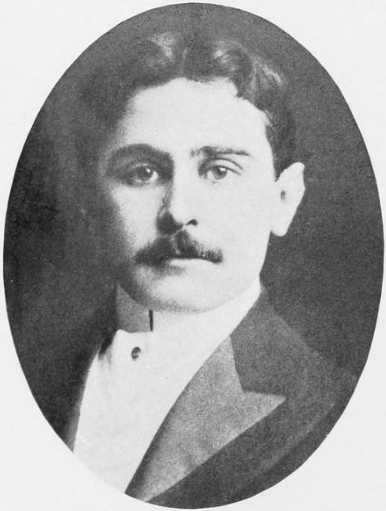
- Born: December 10, 1876; Baltimore, Maryland, U.S.
- Died: September 26, 1959 (aged 82); Rome, Italy
- Education: Maryland Institute College of Art; Art Students League; Académie Julian
- Known for: sculptor
- Notable work: Sir Galahad (1905); Robert J. Collier Trophy (1911)
- Spouse: Beatrice Oberndorf (1886-1960)
- Children: 1
- Relatives: Ephraim Keyser (uncle)

Ernest Wise Keyser (1876–1959) was an American sculptor born in Baltimore, Maryland on December 10, 1876. He studied at the Maryland Institute College of Art in Baltimore and at the Art Students League in New York City and at the Académie Julian and with Denys Puech in Paris.

Robert J. Collier, publisher of Collier's Weekly magazine and president of the Aero Club of America, commissioned Keyser to make the 525-pound (238 kg) Aero Club of America Trophy in 1911. Renamed the Robert J. Collier Trophy in 1922 this annual aviation award administered by the U.S. National Aeronautic Association (NAA), presented to those who have made "the greatest achievement in aeronautics or astronautics in America, with respect to improving the performance, efficiency, and safety of air or space vehicles, the value of which has been thoroughly demonstrated by actual use during the preceding year."

Keyser was a member of the National Sculpture Society and died in Rome on September 25, 1959.

His uncle, Ephraim Keyser, was also a sculptor.

== Works ==
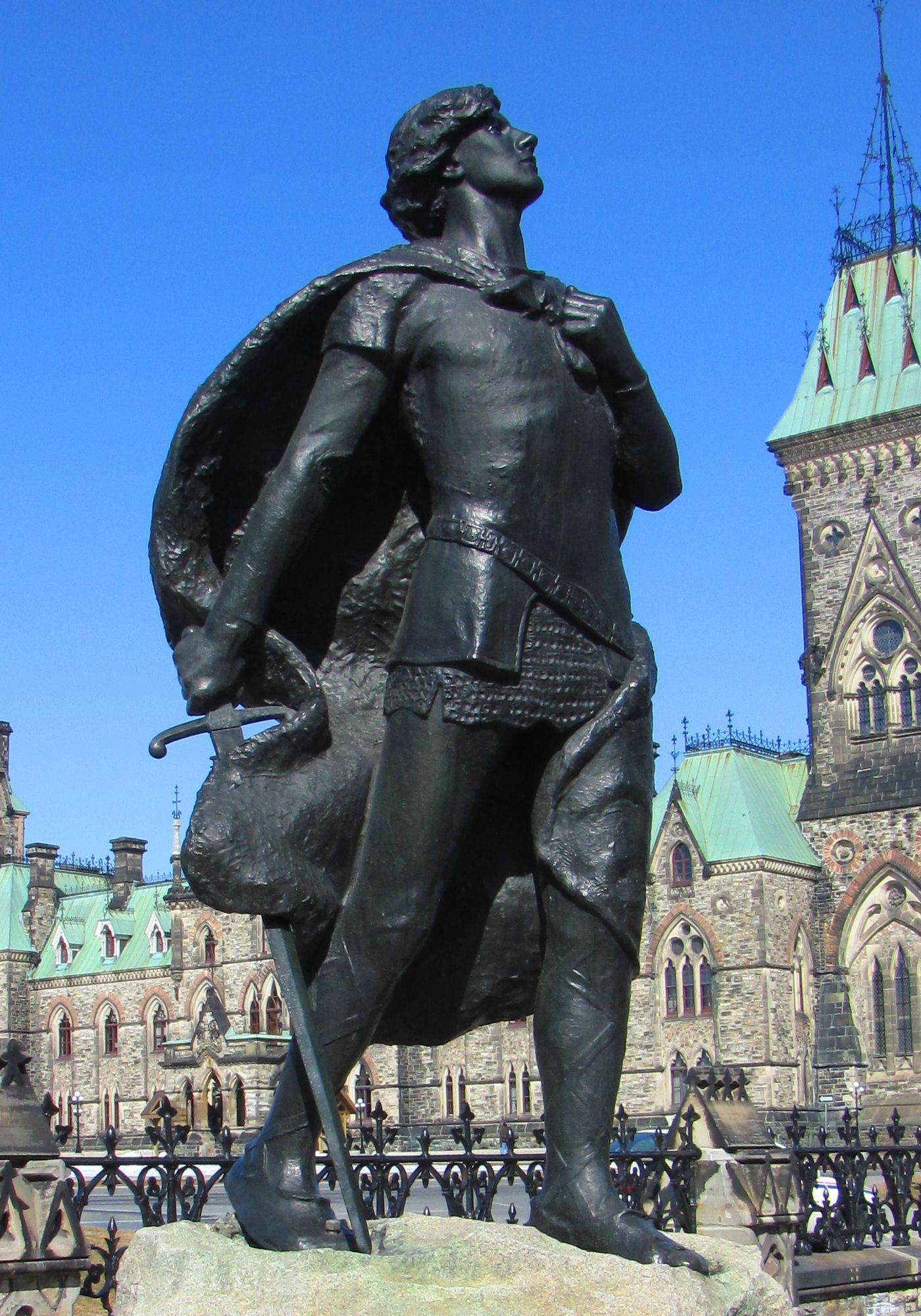
Ernest Wise Keyser's Sir Galahad at Parliament Hill, Ottawa, Ontario, which honors the bravery of Henry Albert Harper

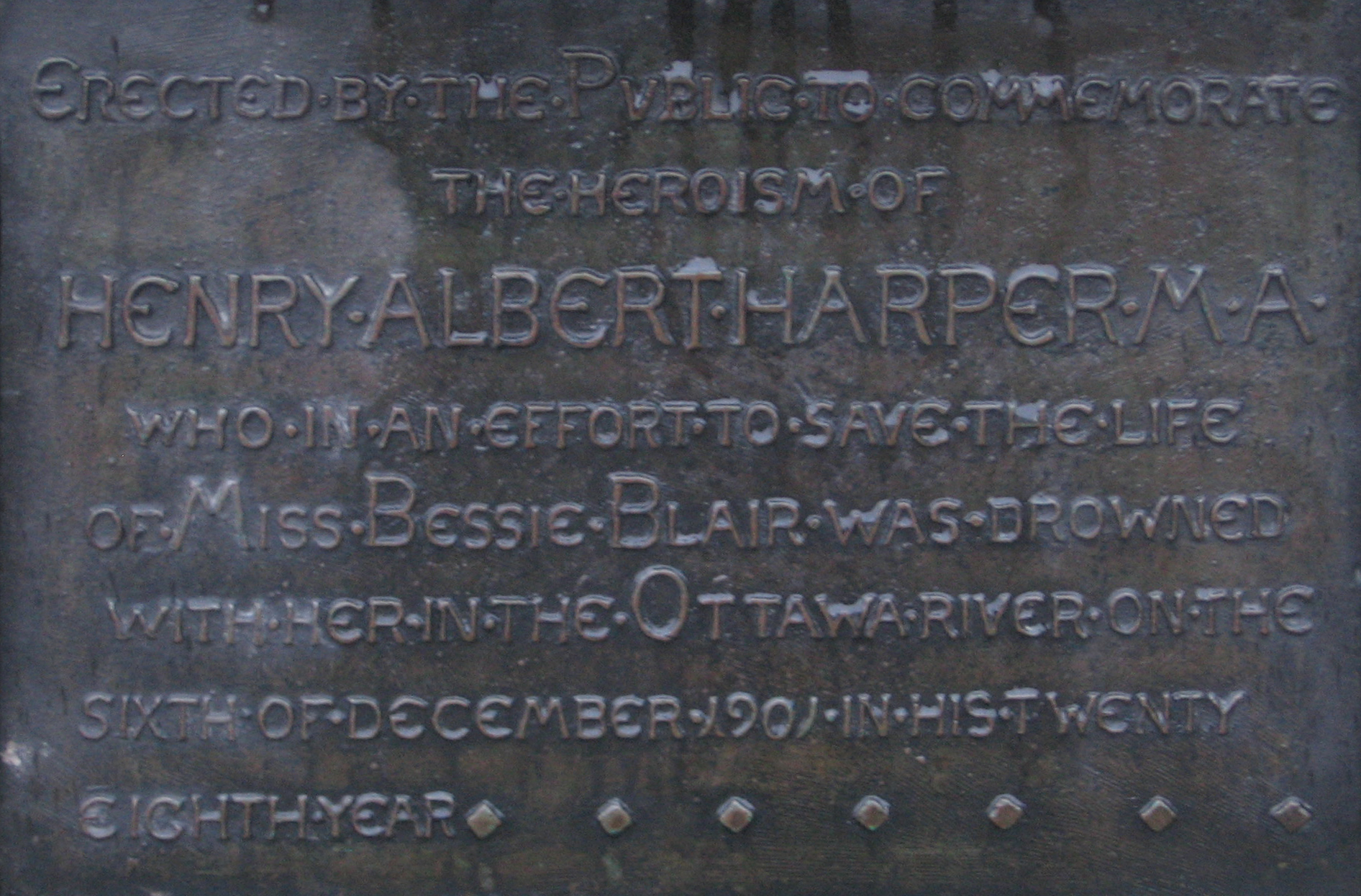
Plaque on Sir Galahad

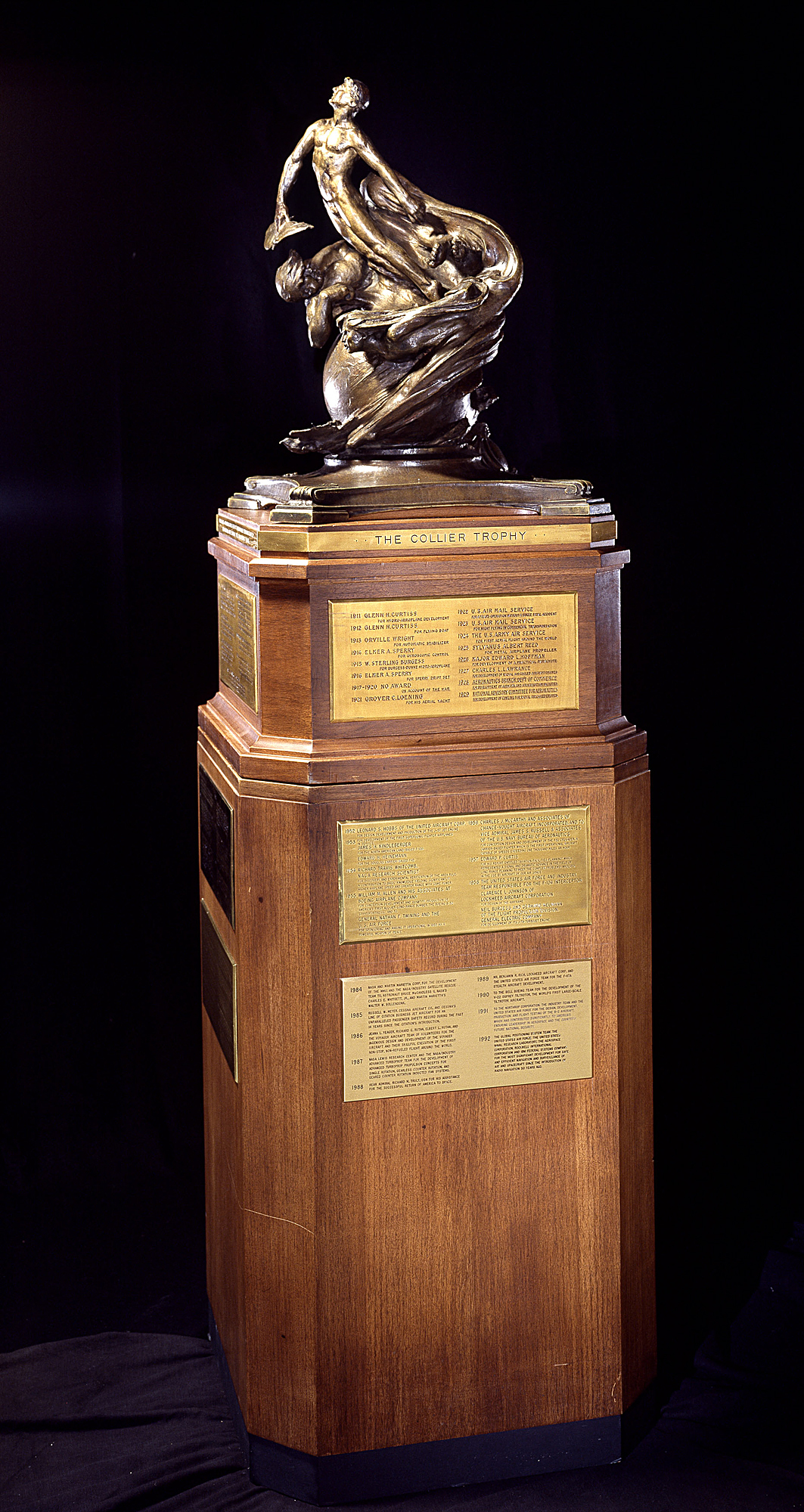
Robert J. Collier Trophy for the greatest achievement in aeronautics or astronautics in America
