= Gettysburg Address =

1863 speech by Abraham Lincoln

- Part of the Eastern theater of the American Civil War
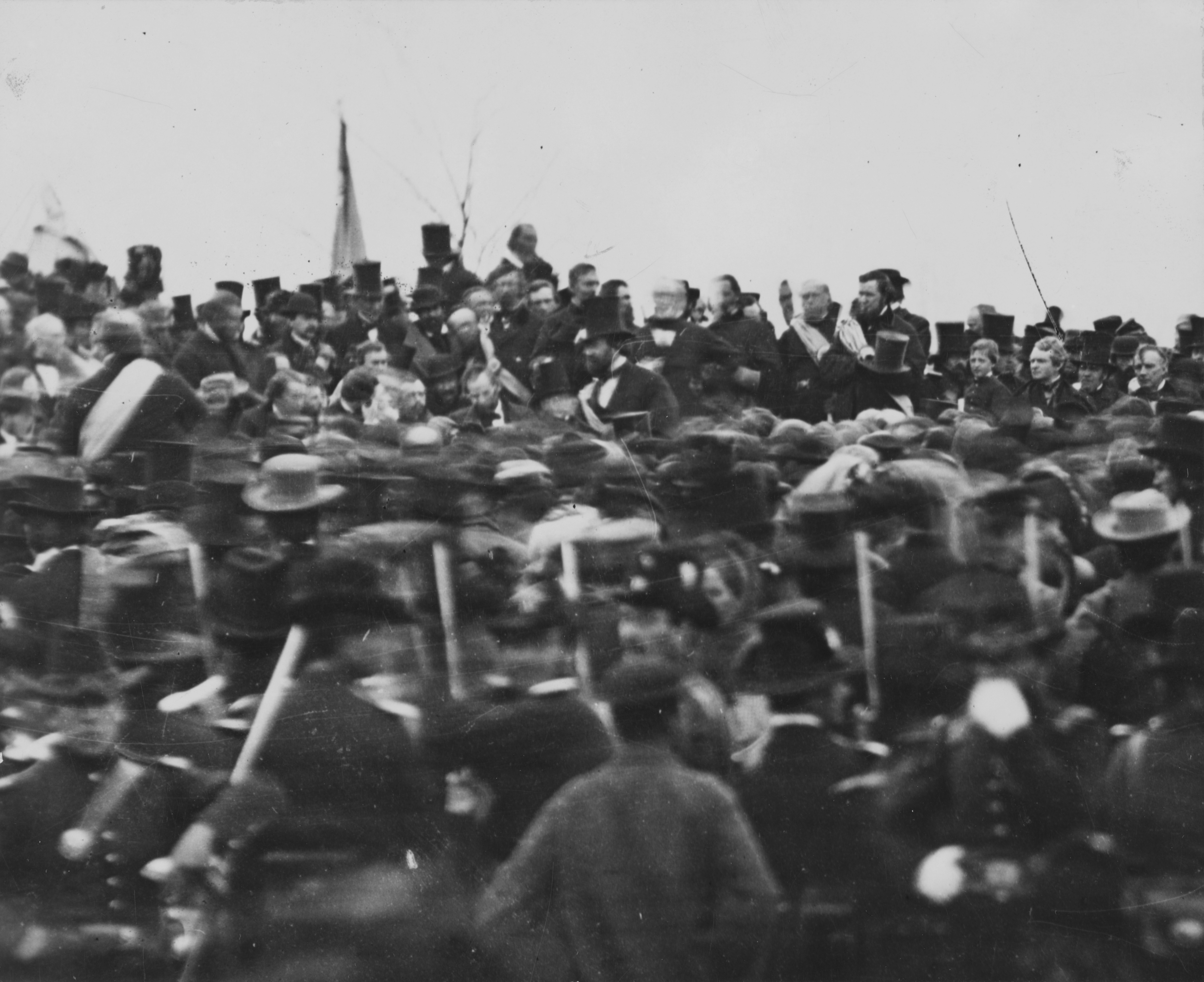
- One of only two confirmed photos of Abraham Lincoln at Gettysburg (seated in center facing camera), taken about noon on November 19, 1863; some three hours later, Lincoln delivered the famed address. To Lincoln's right is Ward Hill Lamon, Lincoln's bodyguard.
- Date: November 19, 1863; 163 years ago

The Gettysburg Address is a dedication speech delivered by Abraham Lincoln, the 16th U.S. president, following the Battle of Gettysburg during the American Civil War. The speech has come to be viewed as one of the most famous, enduring, and historically significant speeches in American history.

Lincoln delivered the speech on the afternoon of November 19, 1863, during a formal dedication of Soldiers' National Cemetery, now known as Gettysburg National Cemetery, on the grounds where the Battle of Gettysburg had been fought four and a half months earlier, between July 1 and July 3, 1863, in Gettysburg, Pennsylvania. In the battle, Union army soldiers successfully repelled and defeated Confederate forces in what proved to be the Civil War's deadliest and most decisive battle, resulting in more than 50,000 Confederate and Union army casualties in a Union victory that altered the war's course in the Union's favor.

The historical and enduring significance and fame of the Gettysburg Address is at least partly attributable to its brevity; it has only 271 words and was read in less than two minutes before approximately 15,000 people who had gathered to commemorate the sacrifice of the Union soldiers, over 3,000 of whom had been killed during the three-day battle. Lincoln began with a reference to the Declaration of Independence of 1776; "Four score and seven years ago our fathers brought forth on this continent, a new nation, conceived in Liberty, and dedicated to the proposition that all men are created equal."

He said that the Civil War was "testing whether that nation, or any nation so conceived and so dedicated, can long endure". Lincoln then extolled the sacrifices of the thousands who had died in the Battle of Gettysburg in defense of those principles, and he argued that their sacrifice should elevate the nation's commitment to ensuring the Union prevailed and the nation endured, famously saying "that these dead shall not have died in vain—that this nation, under God, shall have a new birth of freedom—and that government of the people, by the people, for the people, shall not perish from the earth."

Despite the historical significance and fame that the speech ultimately obtained, Lincoln was scheduled to give only brief dedicatory remarks, following the main oration given by the elder statesman Edward Everett. Thus, Lincoln's closing remarks consumed a very small fraction of the multi-hour event, and was therefore not immediately recognized as particularly significant. Over time, it came to be widely viewed as one of the greatest and most influential statements ever delivered on the American national purpose, and it came to be seen as one of the most prominent examples of the successful use of the English language and rhetoric to advance a political cause.

== Background ==
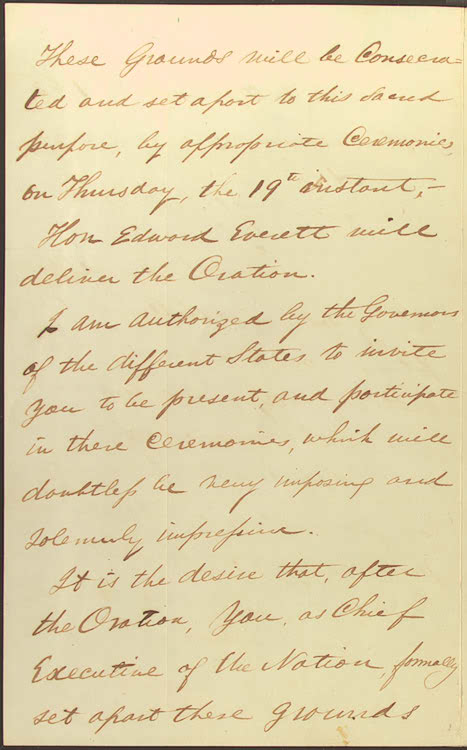
The written invitation sent by David Wills, the primary organizer of the ceremonial dedication of Soldiers' National Cemetery, inviting Lincoln to speak at the event

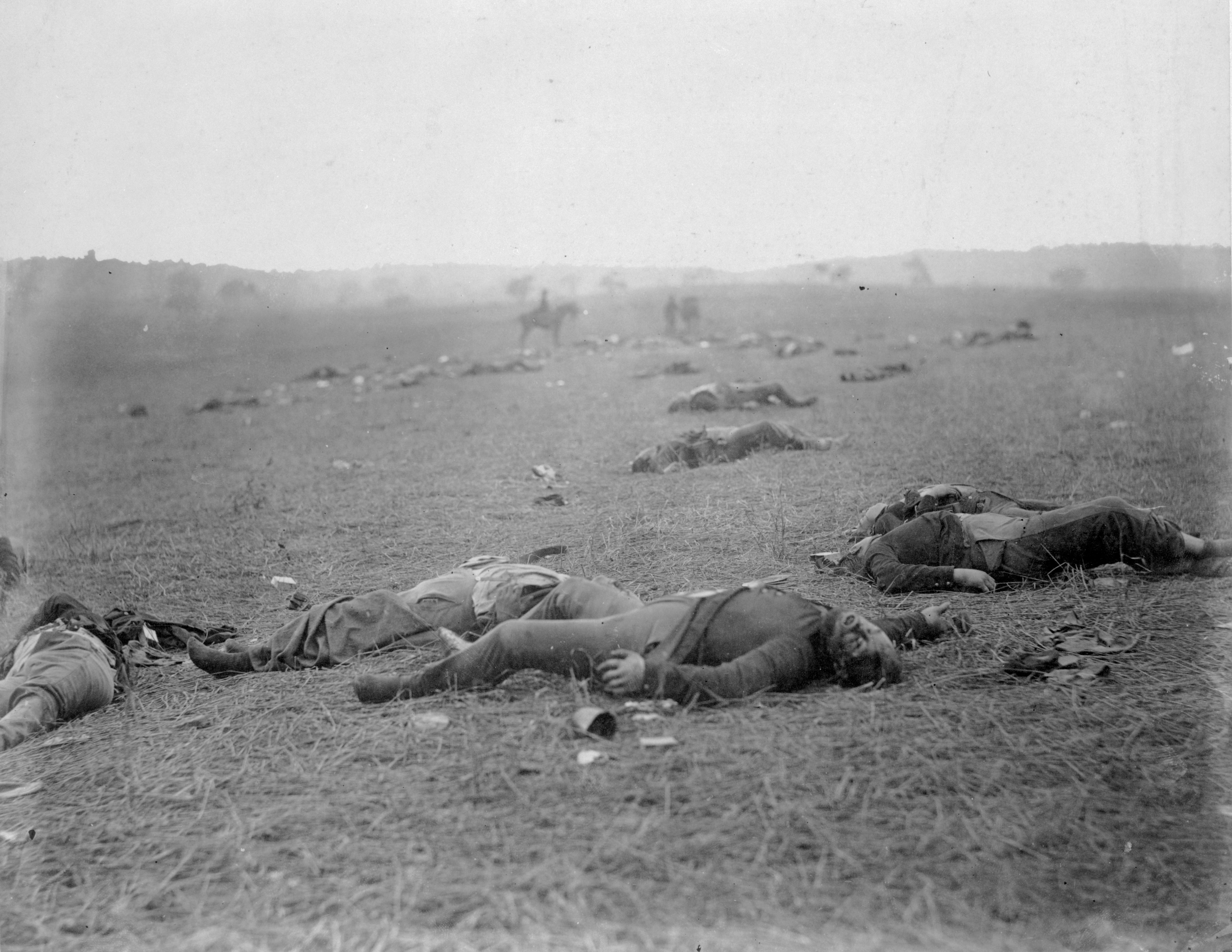
A Harvest of Death, a photo taken by Timothy H. O'Sullivan immediately following the Battle of Gettysburg, showing Union army soldiers then lying dead on the Gettysburg battlefield

In inviting President Lincoln to speak at the ceremony, David Wills, a member of the committee for the November 19 Consecration of the National Cemetery at Gettysburg, wrote, "It is the desire that, after the Oration, you, as Chief Executive of the nation, formally set apart these grounds to their sacred use by a few appropriate remarks."

On November 18, 1863, Lincoln departed Washington, D.C. for Gettysburg, accompanied by three of his cabinet members, William Seward, John Usher, and Montgomery Blair, several foreign officials, his secretary John Nicolay, and his assistant secretary, John Hay. During the trip, Lincoln told Hay that he felt weak. The following morning, on November 19, Lincoln mentioned to Nicolay that he felt dizzy. Hay noted during the speech that Lincoln's face had "a ghastly color" and that he was "sad, mournful, almost haggard". After the speech, when Lincoln boarded the 6:30 pm train to return to Washington, D.C., he was feverish and weak with a severe headache. He was subsequently diagnosed with a mild case of smallpox, which included a vesicular rash. Modern clinicians believe that Lincoln was likely in a prodromal period of smallpox when he delivered the Gettysburg Address.

Lincoln arrived in Gettysburg later that night, just as the city was beginning to fill with large crowds who had arrived to participate in it the following day. Lincoln spent the night in Wills' house, where a large crowd appeared, singing and wanting Lincoln to speak. Lincoln left Wills' house to meet the crowd, but did not deliver any formal remarks, instead speaking briefly and extemporaneously. The crowd then continued on to the house where Lincoln's Secretary of State William Seward was staying that night. Seward spoke to the crowd. Later that night, Lincoln wrote and briefly met with Seward before going to sleep around midnight.

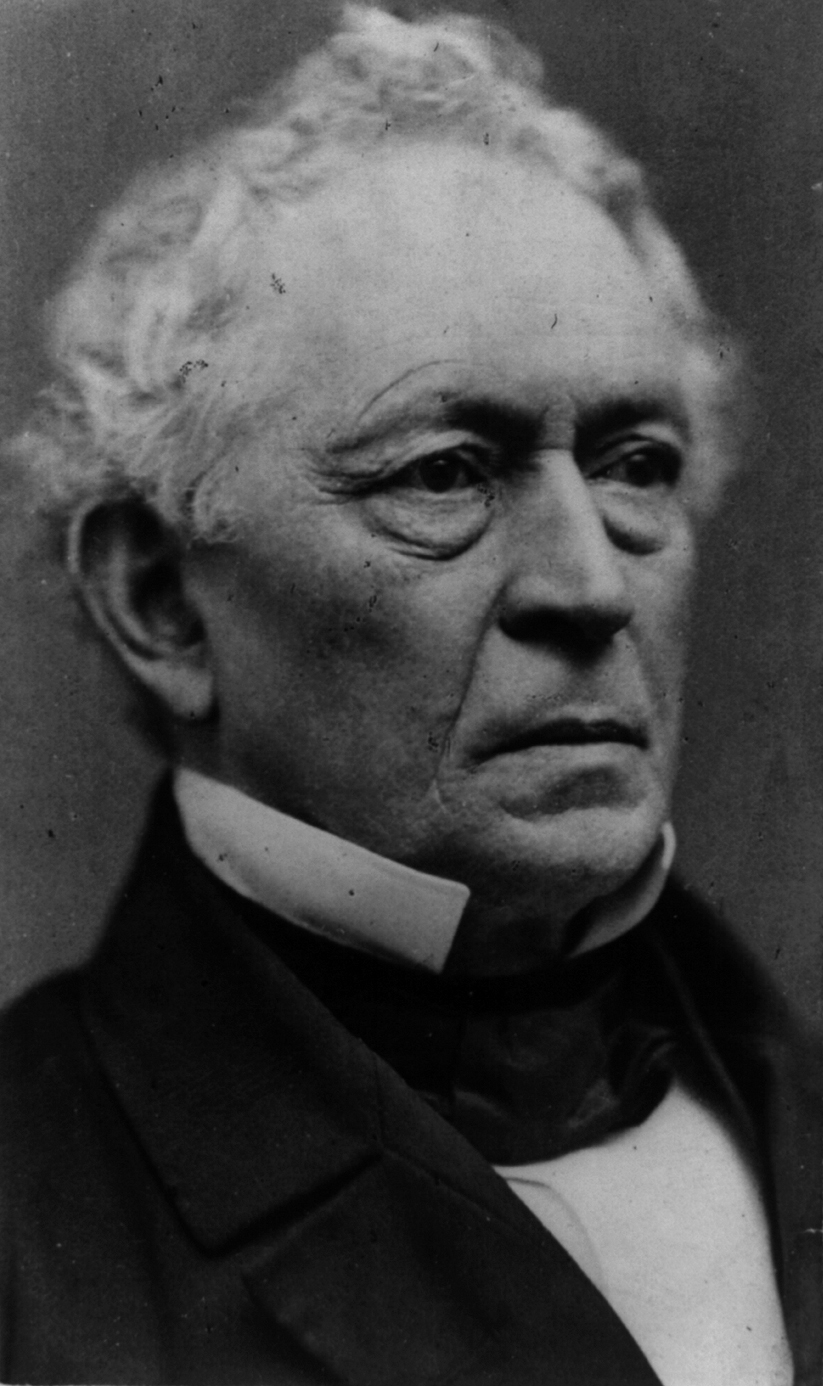
Edward Everett, who delivered the day's primary speech, a two-hour oration prior to Lincoln's much briefer dedication

While Lincoln's short address proved to be by far the most historically notable that day, and is often held up as an example of English public oratory, Edward Everett's oration was slated to be the main speech of the day. His now seldom read speech was 13,607 words in length, and lasted two hours. During this era, lengthy dedication addresses of cemeteries, like the one delivered by Everett, were very common. The tradition began in 1831 when Justice Joseph Story delivered a lengthy dedication address at Mount Auburn Cemetery in Cambridge, Massachusetts. Many of the lengthy addresses of the era linked cemeteries to the mission of the Union.

== Text ==
Shortly after Everett concluded his lengthy speech, which was well received by the crowd, Lincoln rose and, from the speakers' podium, addressed the crowd for only approximately two minutes. His 271-word speech was ten sentences long.

Despite the historical significance of Lincoln's speech, modern scholars disagree on the precise wording in Lincoln's speech, and contemporary transcriptions published in newspaper accounts of the event and several of Lincoln's handwritten copies of the address differ slightly in wording, punctuation, and structure. Among these versions, the Bliss version, written by Lincoln after the speech as a favor for a friend, is viewed by many as the standard text. Its text differs, however, from the written versions prepared by Lincoln before and after his speech. But it is the only version which includes Lincoln's signature, and the last version of the speech that he is known to have written.

The Bliss version is as follows:

Four score and seven years ago our fathers brought forth on this continent, a new nation, conceived in Liberty, and dedicated to the proposition that all men are created equal.

Now we are engaged in a great civil war, testing whether that nation, or any nation so conceived and so dedicated, can long endure. We are met on a great battle-field of that war. We have come to dedicate a portion of that field, as a final resting place for those who here gave their lives that that nation might live. It is altogether fitting and proper that we should do this.

But, in a larger sense, we can not dedicate—we can not consecrate—we can not hallow—this ground. The brave men, living and dead, who struggled here, have consecrated it, far above our poor power to add or detract. The world will little note, nor long remember what we say here, but it can never forget what they did here. It is for us the living, rather, to be dedicated here to the unfinished work which they who fought here have thus far so nobly advanced. It is rather for us to be here dedicated to the great task remaining before us—that from these honored dead we take increased devotion to that cause for which they gave the last full measure of devotion—that we here highly resolve that these dead shall not have died in vain—that this nation, under God, shall have a new birth of freedom—and that government of the people, by the people, for the people, shall not perish from the earth.

— Abraham Lincoln

As read by Britton Rea, 2006: (Note: This reading replaces "far so" with "so far", in "...thus far so nobly advanced.", compared to the Bliss copy)

== Lincoln's sources ==
In Lincoln at Gettysburg, Garry Wills notes the parallels between Lincoln's speech and Pericles's Funeral Oration during the Peloponnesian War, described by Thucydides. Pericles' speech, like Lincoln's:

- Begins with an acknowledgment of revered predecessors: "I shall begin with our ancestors: it is both just and proper that they should have the honor of the first mention on an occasion like the present"
- Praises the uniqueness of the State's commitment to democracy: "If we look to the laws, they afford equal justice to all in their private differences"
- Honors the sacrifice of the slain, "Thus choosing to die resisting, rather than to live submitting, they fled only from dishonor, but met danger face to face"
- Exhorts the living to continue the struggle: "You, their survivors, must determine to have as unfaltering a resolution in the field, though you may pray that it may have a happier issue."

James M. McPherson notes this connection in his review of Wills's book. Gore Vidal also draws attention to this link in a BBC documentary about oration.

In contrast, writer Adam Gopnik, in The New Yorker, notes that Everett's oration was explicitly neoclassical, referring directly to Marathon and Pericles. "Lincoln's rhetoric is, instead, deliberately Biblical. (It is difficult to find a single obviously classical reference in any of his speeches.) Lincoln had mastered the sound of the King James Bible so completely that he could recast abstract issues of constitutional law in Biblical terms, making the proposition that Texas and New Hampshire should be forever bound by a single post office sound like something right out of Genesis," Gopnik wrote.

Historian Allen C. Guelzo and others have suggested that Lincoln's phrase, "four score and seven", was an indirect reference to the King James Version of the Bible Psalm 90:10 in which man's lifespan is described as "threescore years and ten; and if by reason of strength they be fourscore years". LaFantasie also connected "four score and seven years" with Psalm 90:10, and referred to Lincoln's usage of the phrase "our fathers" as "mindful of the Lord's Prayer". He also refers to Garry Wills's tracing of spiritual language in the address to the Gospel of Luke.

Wills also observed Lincoln's usage of the imagery of birth, life, and death in the address, during which he referenced the nation as being "brought forth", "conceived", and saying that it shall not "perish". A 1959 thesis by William J. Wolf suggested that the address had a central image of baptism, although Glenn LaFantasie, writing for the Journal of the Abraham Lincoln Association, believes that Wolf's position was likely an overstatement. Philip B. Kunhardt Jr. suggests that Lincoln was inspired by the Book of Common Prayer.

Historian Matthew Pinsker believes Lincoln described "a new birth of freedom" based on The New York Times' July 6 report that soldiers had "baptized with your blood the second birth of Freedom in America." Lincoln was familiar with the reporting of that Times journalist, Samuel Wilkeson Jr.

=== "Government of the people, by the people, for the people" ===
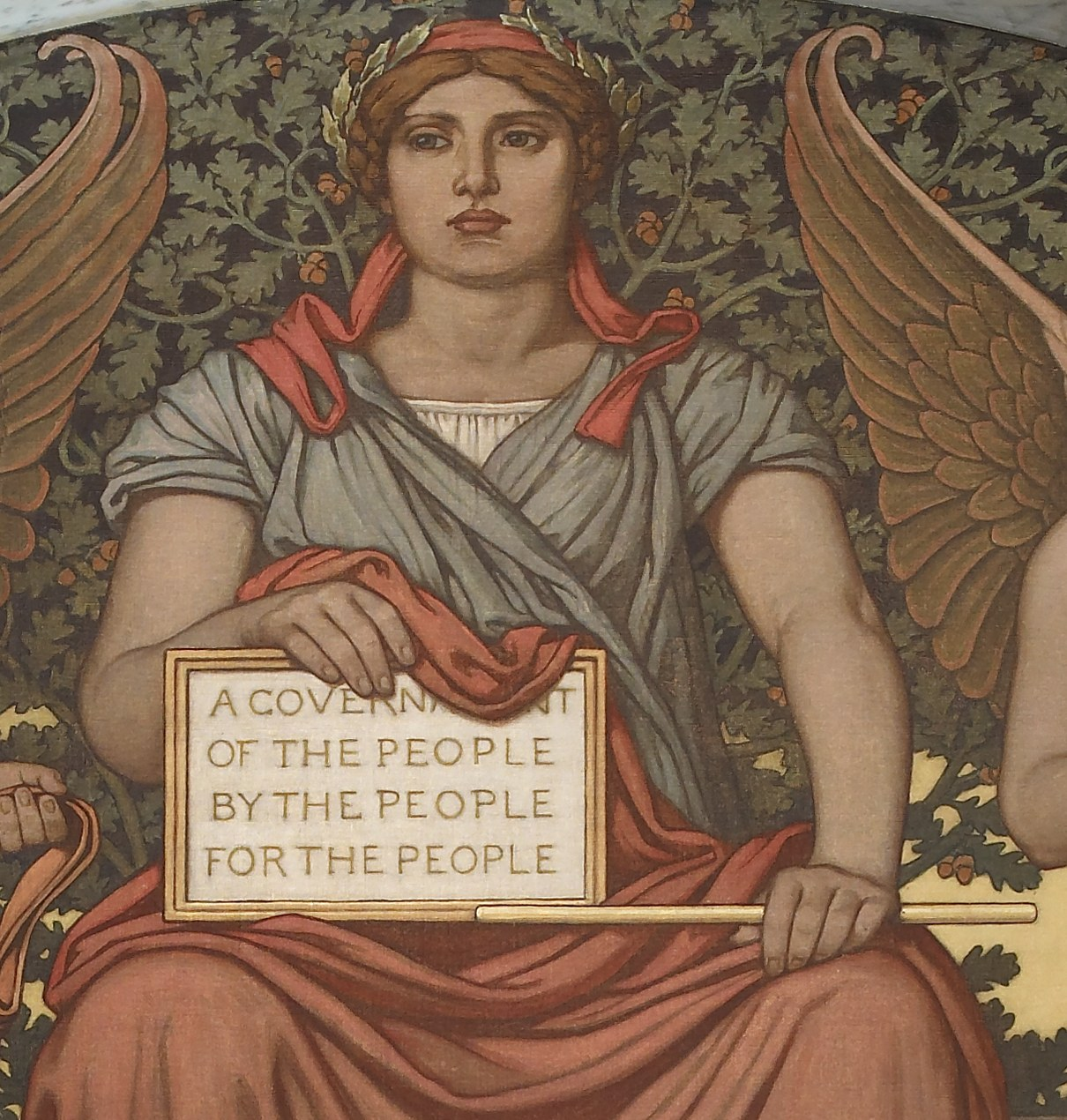
Elihu Vedder's 1896 mural Government, inscribed with Lincoln's famed phrase, "government of the people, by the people, for the people", now housed in the Library of Congress in Washington, D.C.

Lincoln scholars have several theories about Lincoln's use of the phrase "government of the people, by the people, for the people" in the Gettysburg Address. Despite claims to the contrary, there is no evidence that a similar phrase appears in the prologue of John Wycliffe's 1384 English translation of the Bible.

In "A more probable origin of a famous Lincoln phrase", published in 1901 in The American Monthly Review of Reviews, Unitarian minister John White Chadwick observed that Lincoln's law partner William Herndon was known to have brought Lincoln several sermons by Theodore Parker, an abolitionist minister from Massachusetts, which proved inspiring and influential to Lincoln. Herndon wrote:

I brought with me additional sermons and lectures of Theodore Parker, who was warm in his commendation of Lincoln. One of these was a lecture on "The Effect of Slavery on the American People" ... which I gave to Lincoln, who read and returned it. He liked especially the following expression, which he marked with a pencil, and which he in substance afterwards used in his Gettysburg Address: "Democracy is direct self-government, over all the people, for all the people, by all the people."

Craig R. Smith, in "Criticism of Political Rhetoric and Disciplinary Integrity", suggested that the views of government that Lincoln described in the Gettysburg Address were influenced by Daniel Webster. In his "Second Reply to Hayne" speech of January 26, 1830, Webster said, "Liberty and Union, now and forever, one and inseparable!" Webster described the federal government as, "made for the people, made by the people, and answerable to the people", possibly influencing Lincoln's use of "government of the people, by the people, for the people". Webster, in turn, may have been influenced by an 1819 speech by John Hobhouse, 1st Baron Broughton, who said, "I am a man chosen for the people, by the people; and, if elected, I will do no other business than that of the people." In Webster's "Second Reply to Hayne" speech, he also said, "This government, Sir, is the independent offspring of the popular will. It is not the creature of State legislatures; nay, more, if the whole truth must be told, the people brought it into existence, established it, and have hitherto supported it, for the very purpose, amongst others, of imposing certain salutary restraints on State sovereignties."

A 2018 article claims that Lincoln was influenced by an 1852 speech by Lajos Kossuth, the leader of the Hungarian Revolution of 1848, given before Ohio legislature, that included the phrase, "The spirit of our age is Democracy. All for the people, and all by the people. Nothing about the people without the people – That is Democracy!"

== Manuscripts ==
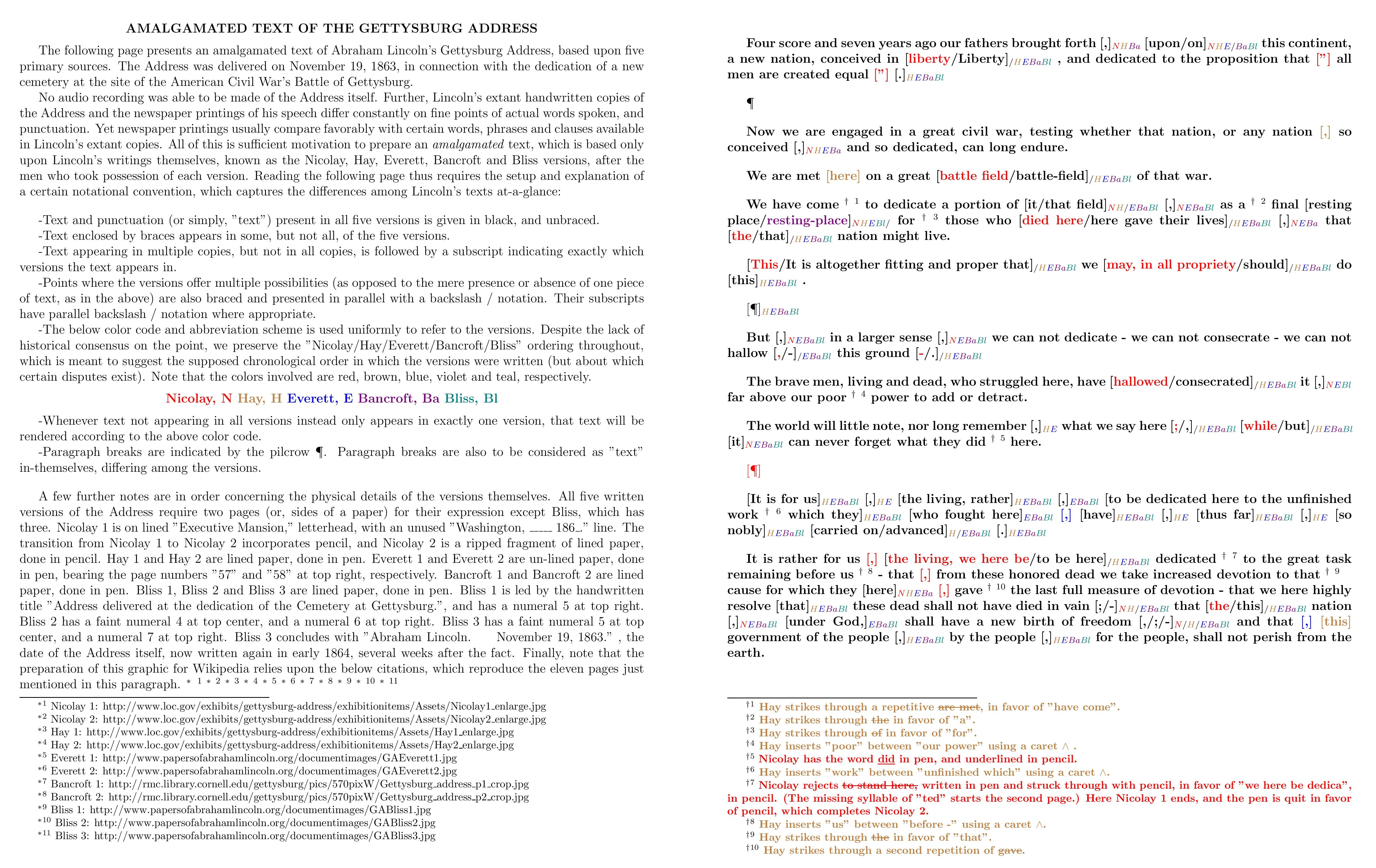
The five extant versions of Lincoln's remarks, presented as a single annotated text^{[a]}^{[b]}^{[c]}^{[d]}^{[e]}

There are five known manuscript copies of Lincoln's Gettysburg Address. Each manuscript is named for the person who received it from Lincoln. Lincoln gave copies to his private secretaries, John Nicolay and John Hay. Both of these drafts were written around the time of his November 19 address, while the other three copies of the address, the Everett, Bancroft, and Bliss copies, were written by Lincoln for charitable purposes after November 19. In part because Lincoln provided a title and signed and dated the Bliss copy, that version has become the standard text of Lincoln's Gettysburg Address.

External videos
- Discussion with Garry Wills on the Nicolay and Hay manuscript copies held by the Library of Congress, December 12, 1994, C-SPAN

In 1874, Nicolay and Hay were appointed custodians of Lincoln's papers by Robert Todd Lincoln, Lincoln's son. After appearing in facsimile in an article written by John Nicolay in 1894, the Nicolay copy was presumably among the papers given to Hay by Nicolay's daughter, Helen, following Nicolay's death in 1901. In 1908, Robert Lincoln began searching for the original copy of the Gettysburg Address, leading to his discovery of a handwritten copy that was part of the bound papers of John Hay, a copy now known as the "Hay copy" or "Hay draft".

The Hay draft differed notably from the version of the Gettysburg Address published by John Nicolay. It was written on a different type of paper, had a different number of words per line and number of lines, and included editorial revisions that were personally made by Lincoln to the speech.

Both the Hay and Nicolay copies of the Gettysburg Address are now housed at the Library of Congress in Washington, D.C., where they are encased in specially designed, temperature-controlled, sealed containers with argon gas designed to protect the documents from oxidation and continued deterioration.

=== Nicolay copy ===
The Nicolay copy^{[a]} is often called the "first draft" of the Gettysburg Address because it is believed to be the earliest copy that exists of it. Scholars disagree over whether the Nicolay copy was actually the copy Lincoln used at Gettysburg on November 19. In an 1894 article, which included a facsimile of this copy, Nicolay, the custodian of Lincoln's papers, wrote that Lincoln brought the first part of the speech written in ink on Executive Mansion stationery, and that he wrote the second page in pencil on lined paper before the ceremonial dedication on November 19. Matching folds are still evident on the two pages, suggesting that it could be the copy that eyewitnesses say Lincoln took from his coat pocket and read from at the ceremony. Others believe that the delivery text has been lost, because some of the words and phrases of the Nicolay copy do not match contemporary transcriptions of Lincoln's original speech. The words "under God", for example, are missing in this copy from the phrase "that this nation shall have a new birth of freedom ..." In order for the Nicolay draft to have been the reading copy, either the contemporary transcriptions were inaccurate, or Lincoln would have had to depart from his written text in several instances. This copy of the Gettysburg Address apparently remained in John Nicolay's possession until his death in 1901, when it passed to his friend and colleague John Hay. The Nicolay version was previously on display as part of the American Treasures exhibition at the Library of Congress.

=== Hay copy ===
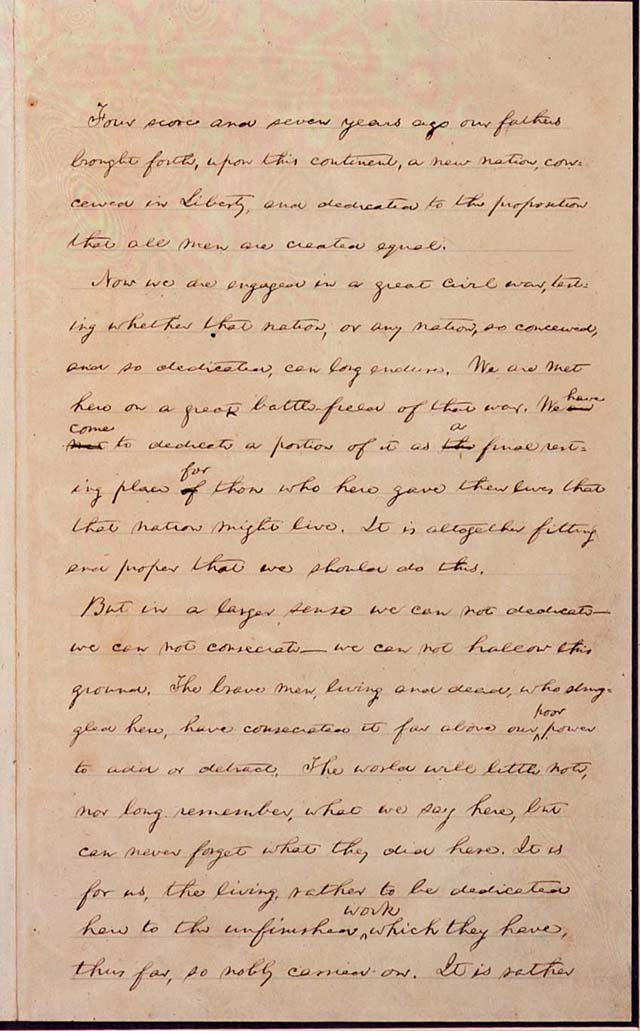
John Hay's copy of the address, including Lincoln's handwritten corrections

The Hay copy of the address^{[b]} was first announced to the public in 1906, following a search for the original manuscript of the address. It was found among the papers of John Hay. The Hay copy differs somewhat from the manuscript of the address described by Nicolay in his article, and includes several omissions and insertions made by Lincoln, including omissions critical to the basic meaning of the sentence, not simply words that would be added by Lincoln to strengthen or clarify their meaning. In this copy of the address, like the Nicolay copy, the words "under God" are not present.

The Hay version has been described as "the most inexplicable" of the drafts and is sometimes referred to as the "second draft". The Hay copy was written by Lincoln either the morning before the event, or shortly after Lincoln's return to Washington, D.C.. Those who believe that it was completed the morning of his address point to the fact that it includes several phrases that are not present in the first draft, which do appear in media coverage of the address and in subsequent copies made by Lincoln. It is probable, they conclude, that, as the Library of Congress includes in an explanatory note accompanying the original copies of the first and second drafts, that this was the version that Lincoln read from when he delivered the address. Lincoln eventually gave this copy of the speech to Hay, whose descendants donated it and the Nicolay copy to the Library of Congress in 1916.

=== Everett copy ===
The Everett copy,^{[c]} also known as the "Everett-Keyes copy", was given to Edward Everett by Lincoln in early 1864, after Everett requested it. Everett collected the speeches at the Gettysburg dedication into a bound volume, which was sold for the benefit of stricken soldiers at New York's Sanitary Commission Fair. The draft Lincoln sent Everett is known as the third autograph copy, and is now held by the Illinois State Library in Springfield, Illinois, where it is displayed in the Treasures Gallery of the Abraham Lincoln Presidential Library and Museum.

=== Bancroft copy ===
The Bancroft copy^{[d]} of the Gettysburg Address was written out by Lincoln in February 1864, following the ceremonial dedication, at the request of George Bancroft, a former Secretary of the Navy and historian whose comprehensive ten-volume History of the United States later led him to be known as the "father of American History". Bancroft planned to include this copy of the Gettysburg Address in Autograph Leaves of Our Country's Authors, which he planned to sell at a Soldiers' and Sailors' Sanitary Fair in Baltimore. This copy, known as the fourth copy of the address, was written by Lincoln on both sides of the paper, and it ultimately proved unusable for this purpose, and Bancroft was allowed to keep it. This manuscript is the only one version accompanied by a letter from Lincoln transmitting the manuscript and by the original envelope addressed and franked by Lincoln. The Bancroft copy was held by the Bancroft family for many years, and was later sold to various dealers and purchased by Nicholas and Marguerite Lilly Noyes, who donated it to Cornell University in 1949. The Bancroft copy is now held by the Division of Rare and Manuscript Collections in the Carl A. Kroch Library at Cornell University. This is the only copy among the five that is privately owned.

=== Bliss copy ===
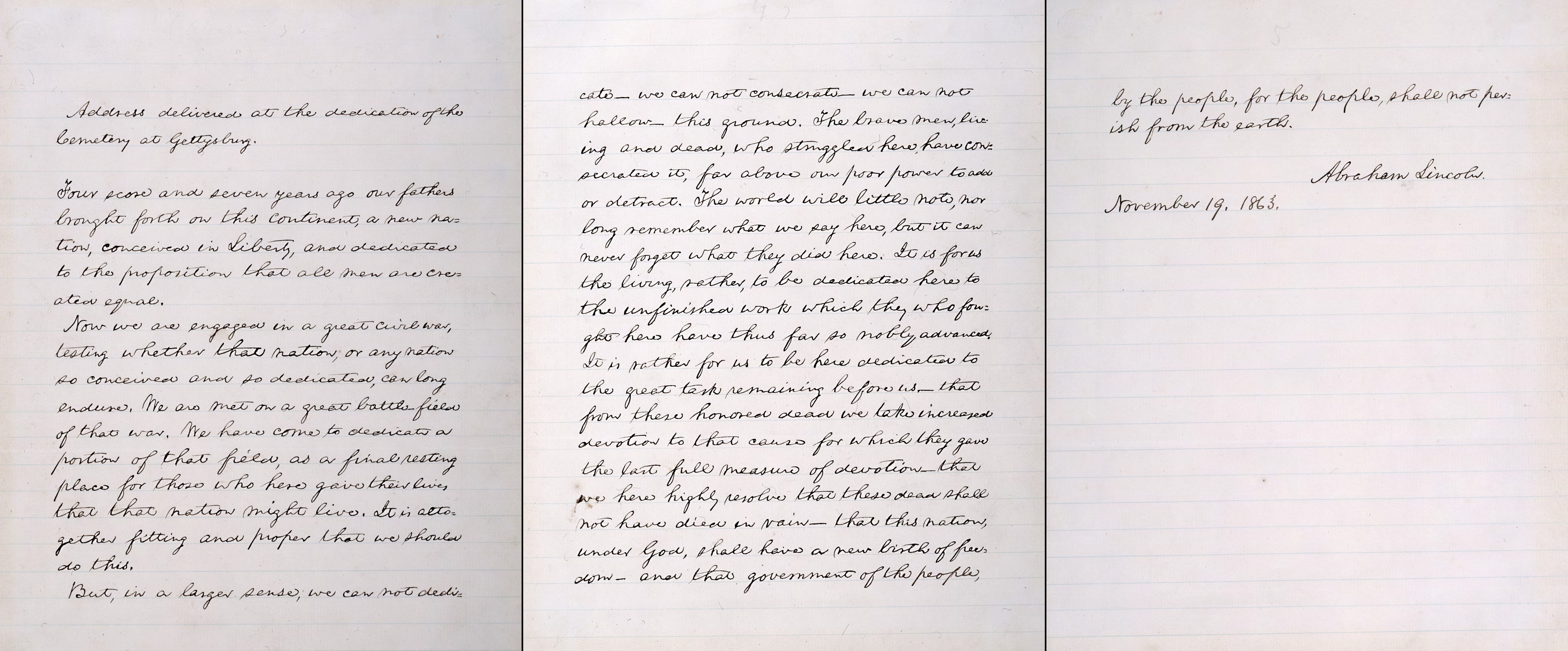
Alexander Bliss' copy of the address, now on display in the Lincoln Room at the White House

Discovering that his fourth written copy could not be used, Lincoln then wrote a fifth and final draft, known as the Bliss copy^{[e]} and named for Colonel Alexander Bliss, Bancroft's stepson and publisher of Autograph Leaves. It is the only copy of the address that is signed by Lincoln and the final version of the address that Lincoln is known to have written. Because of the care Lincoln used in preparing the Bliss copy and because this copy includes a title and is signed and dated by Lincoln, it is considered the standard version of the Gettysburg Address and the source for most facsimile reproductions of Lincoln's Gettysburg Address. It is the version that is inscribed on the South wall of the Lincoln Memorial.

This draft is now displayed in the Lincoln Room of the White House, a gift of Oscar B. Cintas, former Cuban Ambassador to the United States. Cintas, a wealthy collector of art and manuscripts, purchased the Bliss copy at a public auction in 1949 for $54,000 ($731,000 as of 2025), at that time the highest price ever paid for a document at public auction. Cintas' properties were claimed by the Castro government after the Cuban Revolution in 1959. Cintas, who died in 1957, willed the Gettysburg Address to the American people, provided it would be kept at the White House, where it was transferred in 1959.

Garry Wills concluded that the Bliss copy "is stylistically preferable to others in one significant way: Lincoln removed 'here' from 'that cause for which they (here) gave ...' The seventh 'here' is in all other versions of the speech." Wills noted the fact that Lincoln "was still making such improvements", suggesting Lincoln was more concerned with a perfected text than with an "original" one.

From November 21, 2008, to January 1, 2009, the Albert H. Small Documents Gallery at the Smithsonian Institution National Museum of American History hosted a limited public viewing of the Bliss copy, with the support of then First Lady Laura Bush. The museum also launched an online exhibition and interactive gallery to enable visitors to look more closely at the document.

=== Associated Press report ===
Another contemporary source of the text is a dispatch by Joseph L. Gilbert, Associated Press, transcribed from the shorthand notes taken by reporter Joseph L. Gilbert. It also differs from the drafted text in a number of minor ways.

== Contemporary sources and reaction ==
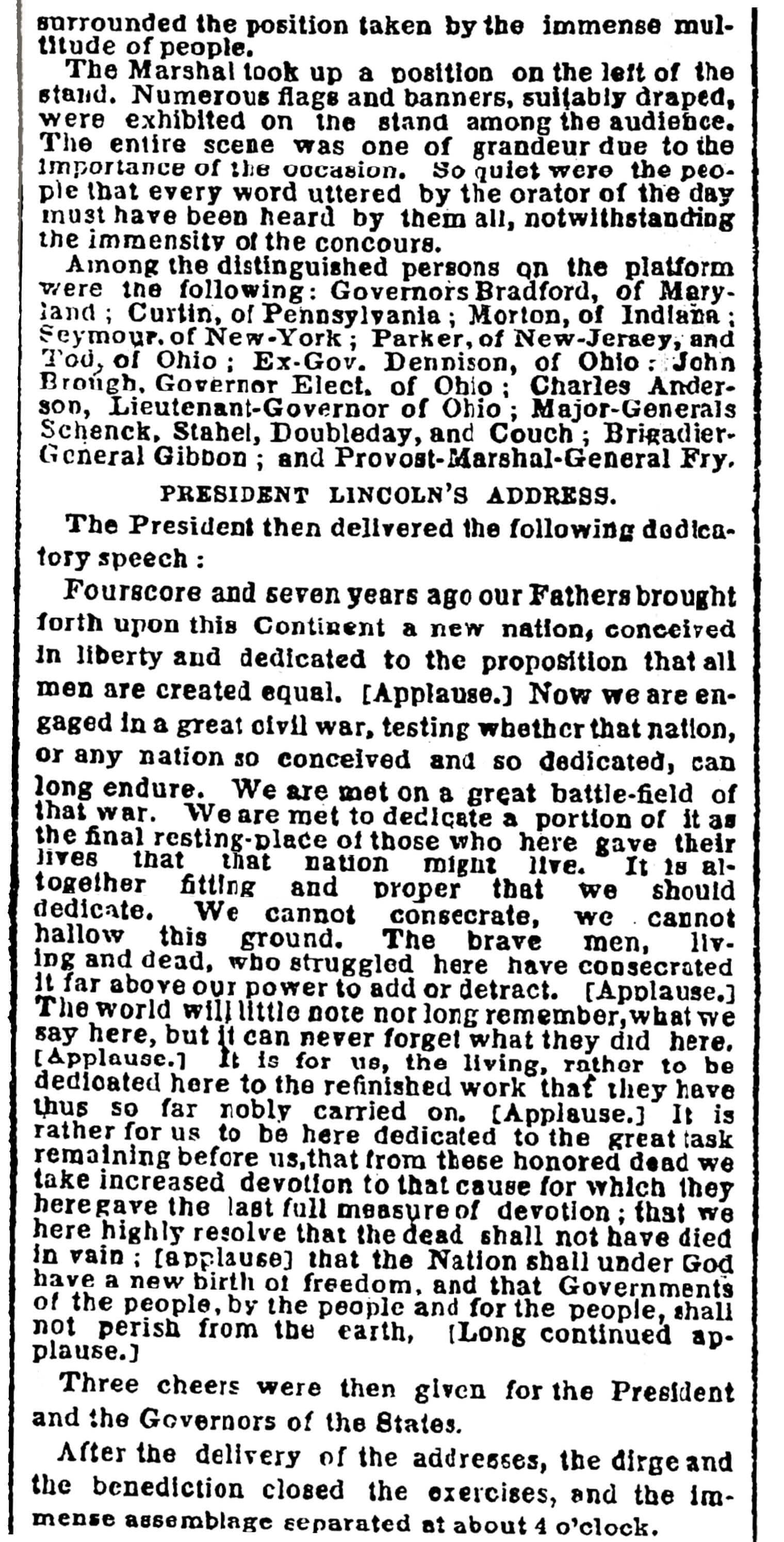
The November 20, 1863 article in The New York Times covering the event reports that Lincoln's speech was interrupted five times by applause and was followed by "long continued applause".

Eyewitness reports vary on Lincoln's performance and delivery of the Gettysburg Address. In 1931, the printed recollections of 87-year-old Mrs. Sarah A. Cooke Myers, who was 19 when she attended the ceremony, suggest a dignified silence followed Lincoln's speech. "I was close to the President and heard all of the Address, but it seemed short. Then there was an impressive silence like our Menallen Friends Meeting. There was no applause when he stopped speaking." According to historian Shelby Foote, after Lincoln's presentation, the applause was delayed, scattered, and "barely polite". In contrast, Pennsylvania Governor Andrew Gregg Curtin says, "He pronounced that speech in a voice that all the multitude heard. The crowd was hushed into silence because the President stood before them ... It was so Impressive! It was the common remark of everybody. Such a speech, as they said it was!"

In an often repeated legend, Lincoln is said to have turned to his bodyguard Ward Hill Lamon and remarked that his speech, like a bad plow, "won't scour". According to Garry Wills, however, this statement largely originates from Lamon's unreliable recollections and is not an accepted fact. In Garry Wills's view, "[Lincoln] had done what he wanted to do [at Gettysburg]".

In a letter to Lincoln written the day following his address in Gettysburg, Everett praised the President for the speech, saying, "I should be glad if I could flatter myself that I came as near to the central idea of the occasion, in two hours, as you did in two minutes." Lincoln replied that he was glad to know the speech was not a "total failure".

Other public reactions to the speech were divided along partisan lines. The Democratic-leaning Chicago Times observed, "The cheek of every American must tingle with shame as he reads the silly, flat and dishwatery utterances of the man who has to be pointed out to intelligent foreigners as the President of the United States." The Republican-leaning The New York Times, however, was complimentary of Lincoln's address, and printed the full text. The Springfield Republican in Springfield, Massachusetts also printed the entire speech, calling it "a perfect gem" that was "deep in feeling, compact in thought and expression, and tasteful and elegant in every word and comma". The Republican predicted that Lincoln's brief remarks would "repay further study as the model speech".

In 2013, on the sesquicentennial of the address, The Patriot-News in Harrisburg, Pennsylvania, retracted its original reporting on the address, which it described as "silly remarks" deserving "the veil of oblivion", writing further that, "Seven score and ten years ago, the forefathers of this media institution brought forth to its audience a judgment so flawed, so tainted by hubris, so lacking in the perspective history would bring, that it cannot remain unaddressed in our archives. ... the Patriot & Union failed to recognize [the speech's] momentous importance, timeless eloquence, and lasting significance. The Patriot-News regrets the error."

Foreign newspapers also reported critically on Lincoln's address. In London, The Times reported, "The ceremony [at Gettysburg] was rendered ludicrous by some of the luckless sallies of that poor President Lincoln."

Congressman Joseph A. Goulden, then an eighteen-year-old school teacher, was present and heard the speech. He served in the U.S. Marine Corps during the Civil War, and was later elected to Congress as a Democrat. Goulden was often asked about the speech, since the passage of time made him one of a dwindling number of individuals who were present for it. He responded that the event and Lincoln's remarks were met favorably, saying that Lincoln's address served as a factor that inspired him to enter military service. Goulden's recollections were summarized in remarks to the House of Representatives in 1914.

=== Audio recollections ===
William R. Rathvon is the only known eyewitness of both Lincoln's arrival at Gettysburg and the address itself whose recollections have been recorded in audio format. One year before his death in 1939, Rathvon's reminiscences were recorded on February 12, 1938, at WRUL in Boston, including his reading the address, and a 78 RPM record was pressed. The title of the 78 record was, "I Heard Lincoln That Day – William R. Rathvon, TR Productions". A copy of it was later aired by National Public Radio (NPR) during its "Quest for Sound" project in 1999.

Like most people who were present that day in Gettysburg, the Rathvon family was aware that Lincoln was going to offer some remarks to the assembled crowd. The family went to the town square where the procession formed and proceeded to the cemetery, which was then still under construction. At the head of the procession, Lincoln rode on a gray horse preceded by a military band, the first the young boy in the Rathvon family had ever seen. Rathvon describes Lincoln as so tall and with such long legs that they went almost to the ground; he also mentions the long eloquent speech given by Edward Everett, who Rathvon described as the "most finished orator of the day". Rathvon described Lincoln stepping forward "with a manner serious almost to sadness, gave his brief address". During Lincoln's delivery, the young Rathvon boy and several others wiggled their way forward through the crowd until they stood within 15 feet (4.6 m) of Lincoln, and looked up into what he described as Lincoln's "serious face". Rathvon later said that he listened "intently to every word the president uttered and heard it clearly", but "boylike, I could not recall any of it afterwards". However, he said, if any of his companions had said anything disparaging about "old Abe", there would have been a "junior Battle of Gettysburg then and there".

=== Photographs ===
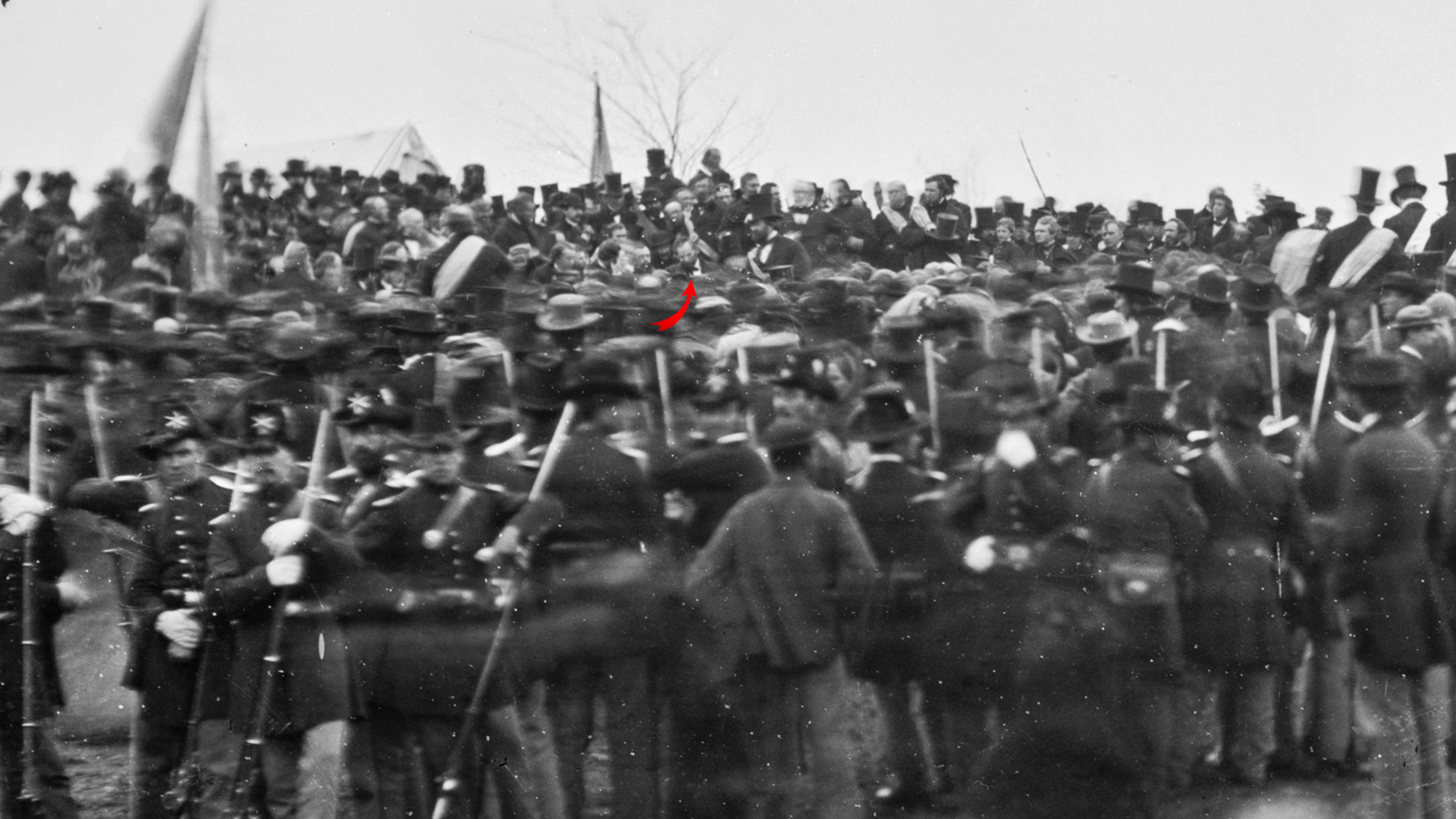
The Bachrach photo, including a red arrow indicating Lincoln's presence, taken several hours before Lincoln rose and delivered the Gettysburg Address

The only known and confirmed photograph of Lincoln at Gettysburg, was taken by photographer David Bachrach. Lincoln's presence in the photos was identified in 1952 by Josephine Cobb, an archivist who enlarged a mislabeled glass plate negative, which revealed Lincoln's presence in the photos that was then on display at Mathew Brady's collection of photographic plates at the National Archives and Records Administration.

While Lincoln's speech was short and may have precluded multiple pictures of him while speaking, he and the other dignitaries sat for hours during the rest of the program. A popular explanation for the Bachrach photo suggests that Lincoln's brief address, which followed a lengthy two hour speech by Everett, caught photographers by surprise. As a result, they supposedly were able to only take a photo of Lincoln after his speech had ended. This theory, however, has been questioned, since evidence exists suggesting that the photo was possibly taken before the Gettysburg Address and without any intention of photographing Lincoln from such a lengthy distance.

=== Usage of "under God" ===
The exact phrase "under God" does not appear in the Nicolay and Hay drafts. But it does appear in the three later copies held by Everett, Bancroft, and Bliss. This has led some skeptics to question whether the words "under God" were included in the remarks Lincoln gave that day. However, at least three reporters telegraphed the text of Lincoln's speech on the day the Address was given with the words "under God" included. Historian William E. Barton argues that:

Every stenographic report, good, bad and indifferent, says 'that the nation shall, under God, have a new birth of freedom.' There was no common source from which all the reporters could have obtained those words but from Lincoln's own lips at the time of delivery. It will not do to say that [Secretary of War] Stanton suggested those words after Lincoln's return to Washington, for the words were telegraphed by at least three reporters on the afternoon of the delivery.

Reporters present for Lincoln's Gettysburg Address included Joseph Gilbert with the Associated Press, Charles Hale with the Boston Daily Advertiser, John R. Young with the Philadelphia Press, and reporters from the Cincinnati Commercial New York Tribune, and The New York Times. Hale, according to later reports, arrived at the event, and "had notebook and pencil in hand, [and] took down the slow-spoken words of the President". "He took down what he declared was the exact language of Lincoln's address, and his declaration was as good as the oath of a court stenographer. His associates confirmed his testimony, which was received, as it deserved to be, at its face value." One explanation is that Lincoln deviated from his prepared text and inserted the phrase when he spoke. Ronald C. White, visiting professor of history at the University of California, Los Angeles and professor of American religious history emeritus at San Francisco Theological Seminary, wrote:

It was an uncharacteristically spontaneous revision for a speaker who did not trust extemporaneous speech. Lincoln had added impromptu words in several earlier speeches, but always offered a subsequent apology for the change. In this instance, he did not. And Lincoln included "under God" in all three copies of the address he prepared at later dates. "Under God" pointed backward and forward: back to "this nation", which drew its breath from both political and religious sources, but also forward to a "new birth". Lincoln had come to see the Civil War as a ritual of purification. The old Union had to die. The old man had to die. Death became a transition to a new Union and a new humanity.

Prior to 1860, the phrase "under God" was used frequently, usually meaning "with God's help".

== Platform location ==
Designations

Pennsylvania Historical Marker
- Official name: Gettysburg Address
- Type: Roadside
- Designated: December 12, 1947
- Location: PA 134 (Taneytown Rd.) at entrance to National Cemetery; Baltimore St. (old US 140) & PA 134 at entrance to National Cemetery

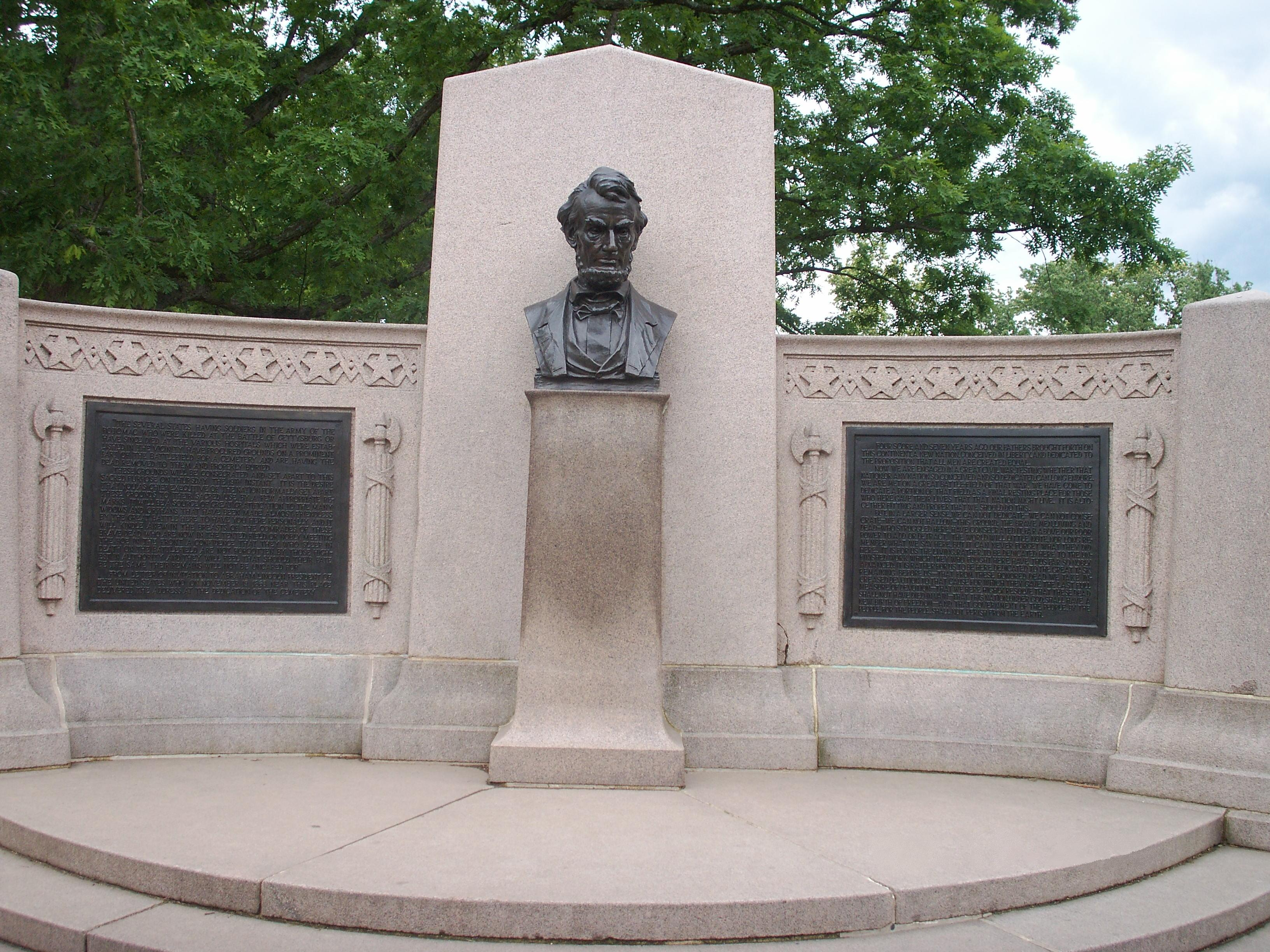
The Lincoln Address Memorial, designed by Louis Henrick, featuring a bust of Lincoln by Henry Kirke Bush-Brown, erected at the Gettysburg National Cemetery in 1912

Outside of both entrances to present-day Gettysburg National Cemetery, there are two historical markers, which read:

Nearby, Nov. 19, 1863, in dedicating the National Cemetery, Abraham Lincoln gave the address which he had written in Washington and revised after his arrival at Gettysburg the evening of November 18.

Directly inside the Taneytown Road entrance are the Lincoln Address Memorial and Gettysburg Rostrum, where five U.S. Presidents have spoken. Lincoln, however, was not one of them, and a small metal sign near the speech memorial stirs remains somewhat controversial, reading:

The Address was delivered about 300 yards from this spot along the upper Cemetery drive. The site is now marked by the Soldiers' National Monument.

Holding title as the "traditional site", the Soldiers' National Monument has been challenged by platform occupants in the distant past and by more recent photographic analyses. Based upon a pair of photographic analyses, the Gettysburg National Military Park has placed a marker near 39°49.199′N 77°13.840′W, which states, "The location [of the platform] was never marked, but is believed to be in Evergreen Cemetery, on the other side of the iron fence."

This newer marker stands faces the fence, which separates the two adjacent cemeteries, the public Gettysburg National Cemetery and private Evergreen Cemetery. A second endorsement of this as the "traditional site", a bronze marker placed by Lincoln's native Kentucky section of the cemetery is nearby.

Absent an original and enduring marker, however, the location of the platform has largely been left up to interpretation. Brian Kennell, superintendent of Evergreen Cemetery, endorses the location identified in the photographic evidence as the location where Lincoln stood as he delivered the Gettysburg Address.

=== Pre-modern ===
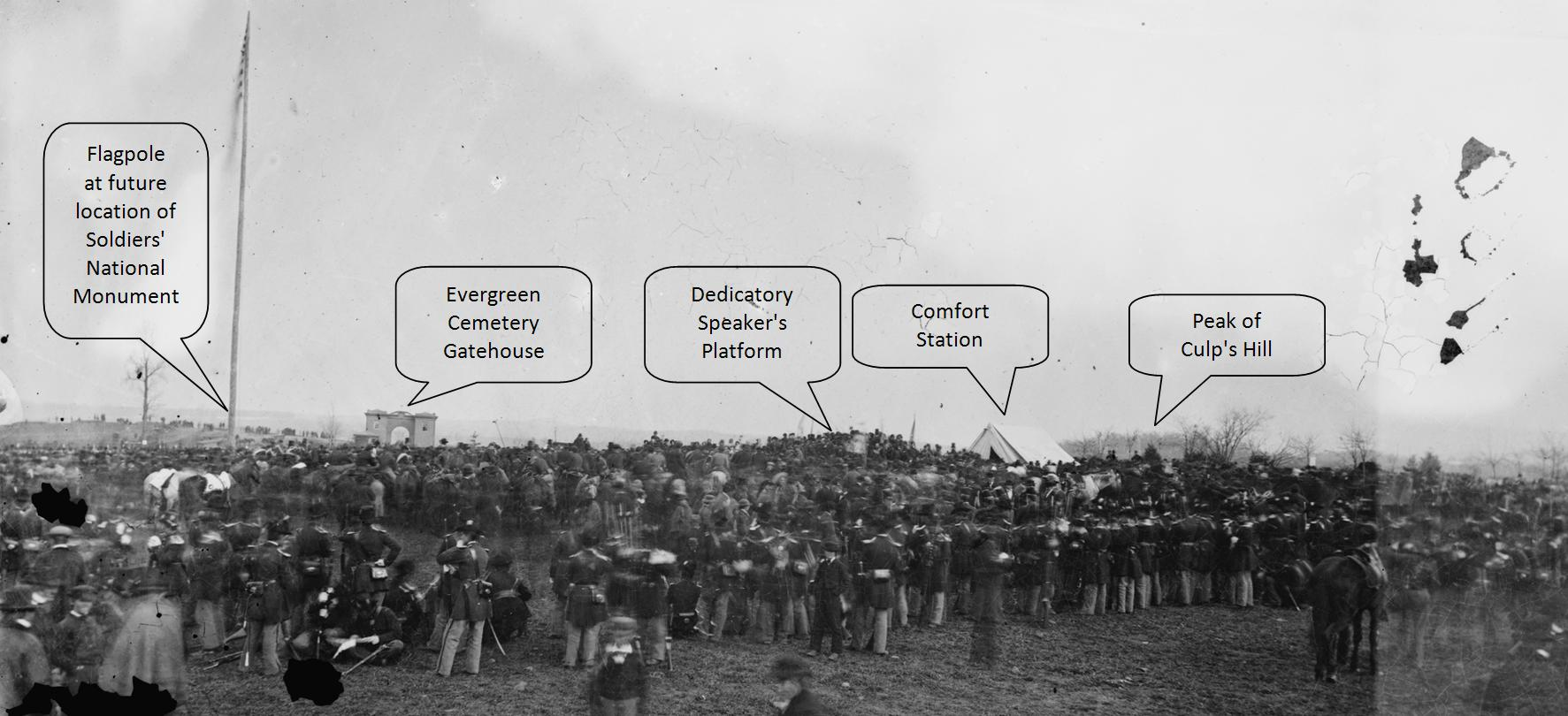
This photograph, taken the day of the Gettysburg Address, is suggested to rule out Soldiers' National Monument as the location for the speaker's platform the day of the address.

Colonel W. Yates Selleck, a marshal in the parade on Consecration Day, was seated on the platform when Lincoln gave the address. Selleck marked a map with the position of the platform and described it as "350 feet [110 m] almost due north of Soldiers' National Monument, 40 feet [12 m] from a point in the outer circle of lots where [the] Michigan and New York [burial sections] are separated by a path". A location which approximates this description is 39°49.243′N, 77°13.869′W.

In 1973, retired park historian Frederick Tilberg concluded the Selleck Site is 25 feet (7.6 m) lower than the crest of Cemetery Hill, and that only the crest presents a panoramic view of the battlefield. A spectacular view from the location of the speech was noted by many eyewitnesses, is consistent with the traditional site at the Soldiers' National Monument and other sites on the crest, but is inconsistent with the Selleck Site.

The Kentucky Memorial, erected in 1975, is directly adjacent to the Soldiers' National Monument, and states, "Kentucky honors her son, Abraham Lincoln, who delivered his immortal address at the site now marked by the soldiers' monument." With its position at the center of the concentric rings of soldiers' graves and the continuing endorsement of Lincoln's native state the Soldiers' National Monument persists as a credible location for the speech.

In November 1863, in a written description of the layout for the Gettysburg National Cemetery, which was then under construction, a correspondent from the Cincinnati Daily Commercial described the dividing lines between the state grave plots as "the radii of a common center, where a flag pole is now raised, but where it is proposed to erect a national monument". With the inclusion of this quotation Tilberg inadvertently verifies a central principle of future photographic analyses—a flagpole, rather than the speakers' platform, occupied the central point of the soldiers' graves. In fact, the precision of the photo-analyses relies upon the coincidence of position between this temporary flag pole and the future monument.

Confusing to today's tourist, the Kentucky Memorial is contradicted by a newer marker, which was erected nearby by the Gettysburg National Military Park and locates the speakers' platform inside Evergreen Cemetery. Similarly, outdated National Park Service documents, which pinpoint the location as being at Soldiers' National Monument, have not been systematically revised since the placement of the newer marker. Miscellaneous web pages perpetuate the Traditional Site.

=== Photo analysis ===
==== 2D and optical stereoscopy ====

In 1982, Senior Park Historian Kathleen Georg Harrison analyzed photographs and proposed the location in Evergreen Cemetery, but she has not published her analysis. Speaking for Harrison without revealing details, two sources characterized her proposed location as "on or near [the] Brown family vault" in Evergreen Cemetery.

In 1995, William A. Frassanito, a former military intelligence analyst, documented a comprehensive photographic analysis, which places the location of the platform with the position of specific modern headstones in Evergreen Cemetery. According to Frassanito, the extant graves of Israel Yount (died 1892)(39°49.180′N 77°13.845′W), John Koch (died 1913)(39°49.184′N 77°13.847′W), and George E. Kitzmiller (died 1874)(39°49.182′N 77°13.841′W) are among those which occupy the location of the 1863 speaker's stand.

==== 3D photo-rendering and -animation ====
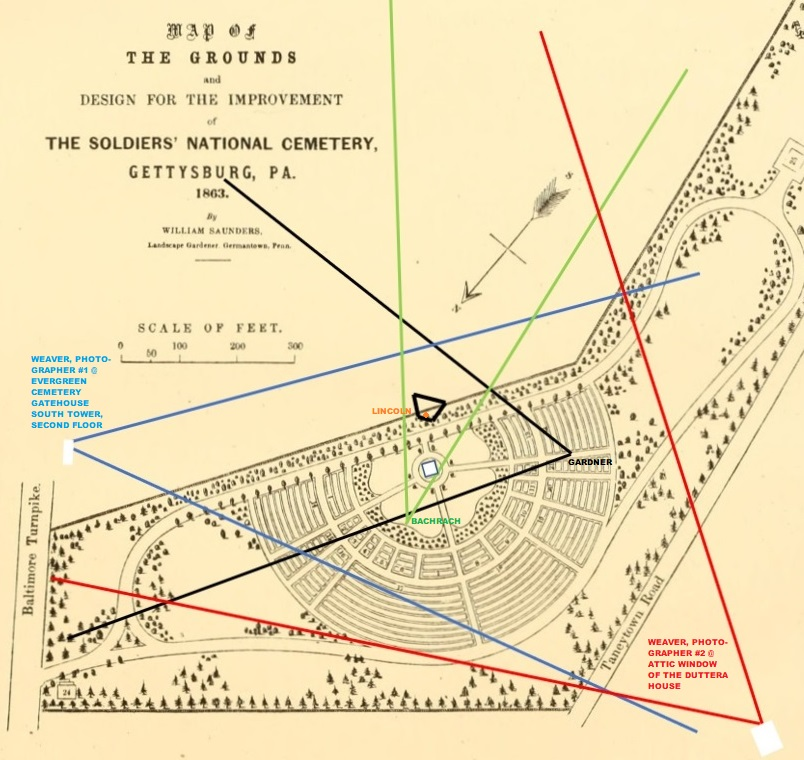
Using modern 3D CGI, Professor Christopher Oakley has provided a highly accurate location for Lincoln and the platform on Dedication Day

Over a course of many years, Christopher Oakley, an assistant professor of new media at the University of North Carolina at Asheville and his students have labored to produce and relentlessly perfect "a lifelike virtual 3-D re-creation of Lincoln delivering the Gettysburg Address" as part of the Virtual Lincoln Project. One result concluded, "Placing the Platform: Using 3D Technology to Pinpoint Lincoln at Gettysburg" was presented on November 18, 2022, at the Lincoln Forum XXVII in Gettysburg.

Oakley's model shows the platform straddling the iron fence between the Soldiers' National Cemetery and Evergreen Cemetery. It increases the size of the platform and changes its shape from rectangular, as previous researchers have maintained, to trapezoidal. The speaker's position (39°49.176′N 77°13.85856′W) occupies a portion of the platform over the grounds of the Soldiers' National Cemetery.

William Frassanito's analysis is based on two of the four photographic perspectives, which were employed by Oakley to validate his 3D model. Frassanito assesses one of his sources, saying, "This view [by Weaver] was probably not taken from the second-story window of the gatehouse itself." Via enlargement of a Gardner photograph (taken from the opposite direction), John J. Richter may have identified a photographer with a camera in this exact window, thereby weakening the contribution of the Weaver photograph to Frassanito's conclusions. Oakley's proprietary 3D model utilizes the position of Weaver's camera as suggested by Richter.

=== Resolution ===
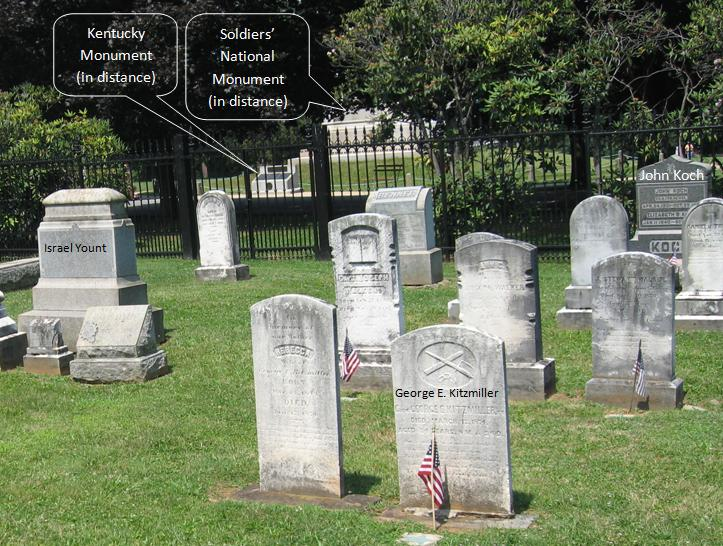
Frassanito's analysis places the dedicatory platform at the graves of George Kitzmiller, Israel Yount, and John Koch. Erroneous indicators are identified in the distant background.

The Gettysburg National Military Park marker, consistent with the findings of various historians, identifies the private Evergreen Cemetery, rather than public Soldiers' National Cemetery, as the exact location where Lincoln delivered the Gettysburg Address. The National Park Service, in its description of Gettysburg National Cemetery, also identifies this as the location where Lincoln spoke that day:

The Soldiers' National Monument, long misidentified as the spot from which Lincoln spoke, honors the fallen soldiers. [The location of the speech] was actually on the crown of this hill, a short distance on the other side of the iron fence and inside the Evergreen Cemetery, where President Lincoln delivered the Gettysburg Address to a crowd of some 15,000 people.

Although Lincoln dedicated the Gettysburg National Cemetery, the monument at the center of the cemetery is unrelated to Lincoln or his famous speech. Intended to symbolize Columbia paying tribute to her fallen sons, its appreciation has been commandeered by the thirst for a tidy home for the speech. Freeing the Cemetery and Monument to serve their original purpose, honoring of Union departed, is as unlikely as a resolution to the location controversy and the erection of a public monument to the speech in the exclusively private Evergreen Cemetery.

== Legacy ==
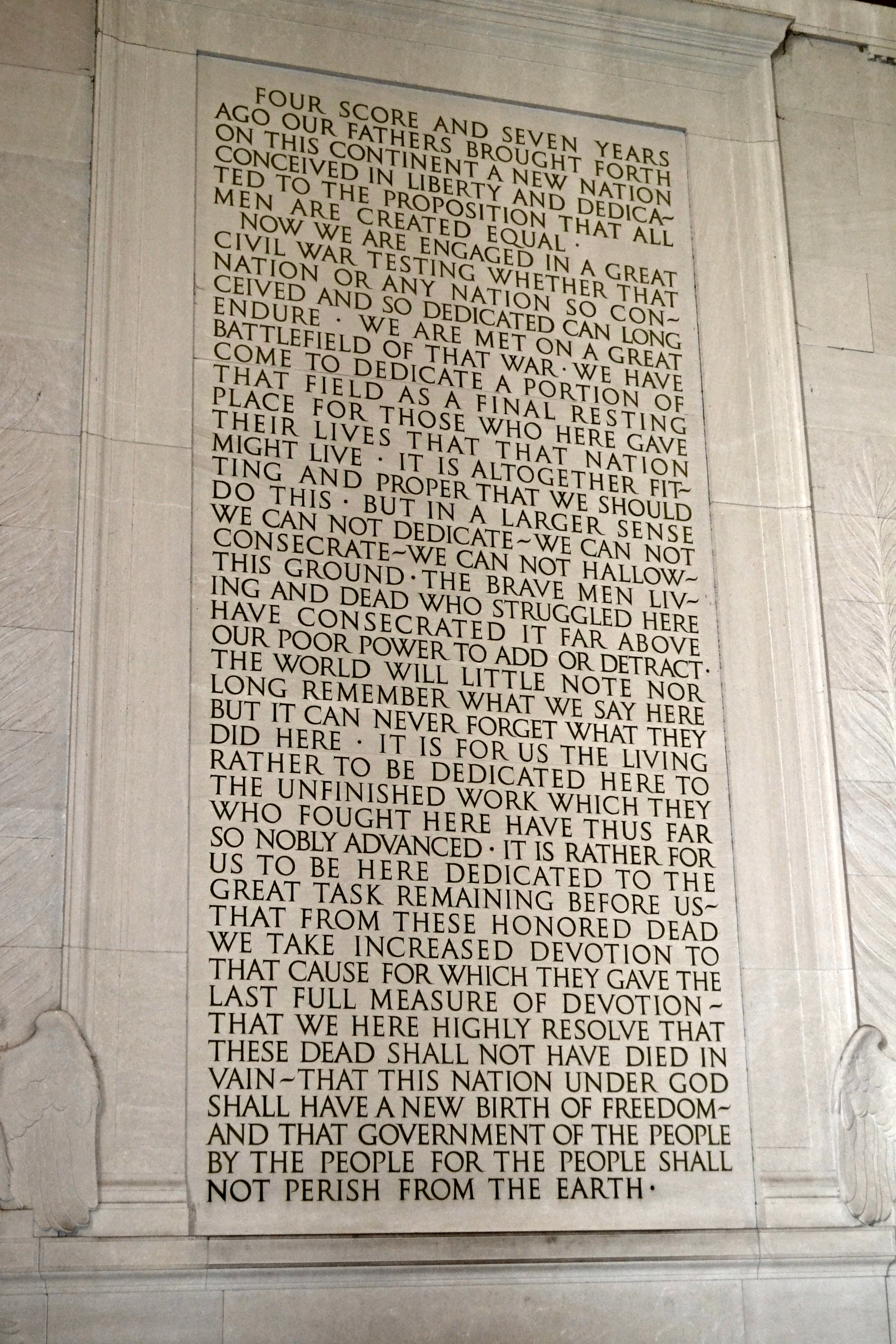
The words of the Gettysburg Address inscribed inside the Lincoln Memorial in Washington, D.C.

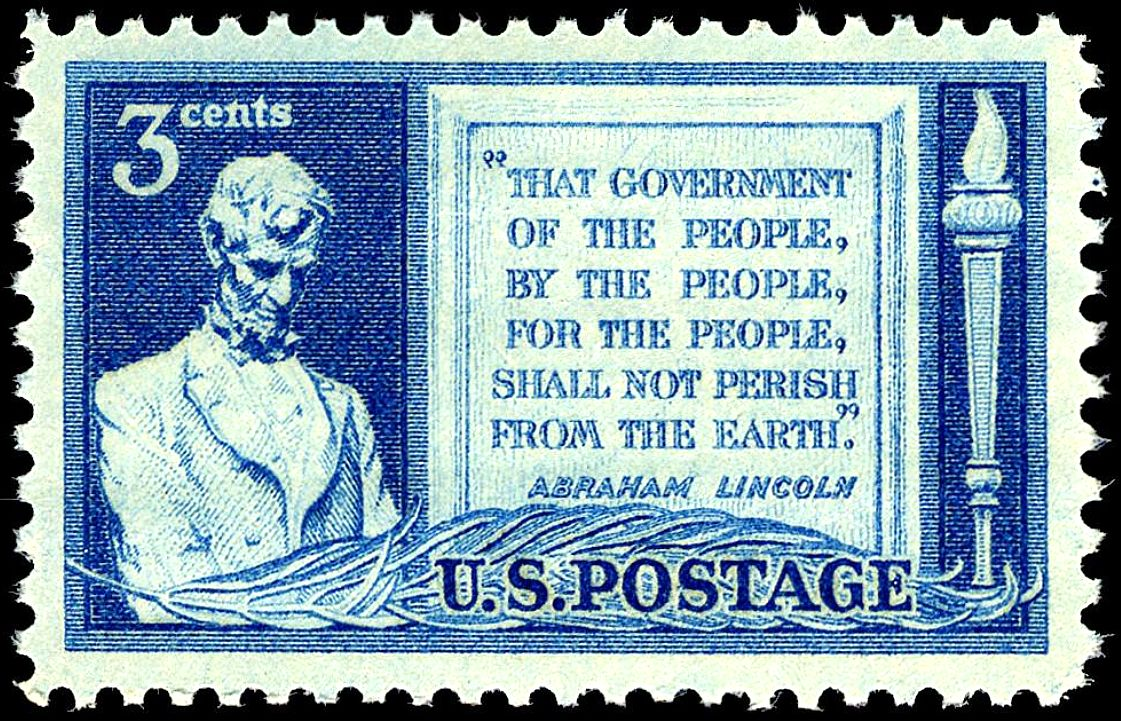
In 1948, on the 85th anniversary of the Gettysburg Address, the U.S. Post Office issued a commemorative stamp honoring the event.

The importance of the Gettysburg Address in the history of the United States is underscored by its enduring presence in American culture. In addition to its prominent place carved into a stone cella on the south wall of the Lincoln Memorial in Washington, D.C., the Gettysburg Address is frequently referenced in popular culture, with the implicit expectation that contemporary audiences are already familiar with the words Lincoln used.

In the many generations that have passed since the address, it has remained among the most famous speeches in American history and is often taught in classes about history or civics. Lincoln's Gettysburg Address is referenced in another famed oration, Martin Luther King Jr.'s "I Have a Dream" speech.

Phrases from the Gettysburg Address are often used or referenced in other works. The current Constitution of France states that the principle of the French Republic is "gouvernement du peuple, par le peuple et pour le peuple" ("government of the people, by the people, and for the people"), a literal translation of Lincoln's words. Sun Yat-Sen's "Three Principles of the People" as well as the preamble for the 1947 Constitution of Japan were also inspired from that phrase.

Following Lincoln's assassination, Charles Sumner, a U.S. Senator from Massachusetts from 1851 to 1874, described the enduring significance of the Gettysburg Address, saying, "That speech, uttered at the field of Gettysburg ... and now sanctified by the martyrdom of its author," is a monumental act. In the modesty of his nature, he said, "the world will little note, nor long remember what we say here; but it can never forget what they did here.' He was mistaken. The world at once noted what he said, and will never cease to remember it."

In January 1961, then U.S. president John F. Kennedy tasked his speechwriter Ted Sorensen with studying the Gettysburg Address in an effort to assist Sorensen in authoring Kennedy's inaugural address. Sorensen drew many lessons from the Gettysburg Address, which according to Sorensen included rhetoric devices used by many speechwriters like alliterations, rhymes, repetitions, contrast, and balance.

In July 1963, Kennedy referenced the Battle of Gettysburg and Gettysburg Address during his own speech in Gettysburg, saying, "Five score years ago, the ground on which we here stand shuddered under the clash of arms and was consecrated for all time by the blood of American manhood. Abraham Lincoln, in dedicating this great battlefield, has expressed, in words too eloquent for paraphrase or summary, why this sacrifice was necessary."

In 2015, the Abraham Lincoln Presidential Library Foundation compiled Gettysburg Replies: The World Responds to Abraham Lincoln's Gettysburg Address, a book that challenges leaders to craft 272-word responses celebrating Lincoln, the Gettysburg Address, or a related topic. One reply by Neil deGrasse Tyson, an astrophysicist, described Lincoln's greatest legacy as establishing, the same year of the Gettysburg Address, the National Academy of Sciences, which had the longterm effect of "setting our Nation on a course of scientifically enlightened governance, without which we all may perish from this Earth".

=== Myths ===
One myth about the Gettysburg Address is that Lincoln quickly authored the speech on the back of an envelope while on the train en route from Washington, D.C, to Gettysburg the day before the address. This widely held misunderstanding may have originated with The Perfect Tribute, a 1906 book by Mary Raymond Shipman Andrews, which was assigned reading for generations of schoolchildren, sold 600,000 copies, and was twice adapted into a movie.

Other lesser known claims include Harriet Beecher Stowe's inaccurate assertion that Lincoln composed the address "in only a few moments", and statements by industrialist Andrew Carnegie, who wrongly said he personally supplied Lincoln with the pen with which he authored the address.

== See also ==
- Consecration of the National Cemetery at Gettysburg
