= Crete Hutchinson =

American writer (1884–1970)

Crete Hutchinson (née, Sprague; 1884–1970) was an American writer. She served as Director of Publicity with the American Library Association's Library War Service during World War I. In January 1936, she became the first Director of the New York Historical Records Survey. During World War II, Hutchinson was the assistant director, division of films, Committee on Public Information, and director, of its division of pictures.

== Early life and education ==
Crete Pauline Sprague was born in Minneapolis, Minnesota, on October 31, 1884. Her parents were Norman Clark and Sarah (Samms) Sprague.

She was educated at Westtown Boarding School, University of Pennsylvania, and University of California, Berkeley. She earned a B.A. degree.

== Career ==
She served as Director of Publicity with the American Library Association's Library War Service during World War I. During the inter-war period, she managed the Bachrach Studios. At the 1929 annual meeting of the National Association of Cotton Manufacturers, Hutchinson, described as a fashion expert, was a guest speaker on the topic. During World War II, Hutchinson was the assistant director, division of films, Committee on Public Information, and director, of its division of pictures.

Hutchinson was the author of Your Job Back Home and In Cloudland. In addition, she wrote travel stories.

She was a member of the Washington Advertising Club, National League of American Pen Women (Auditor), Women's National Press Club, and Westtown Old Scholars' Association.

== Personal life ==
Hutchinson was a resident of Washington, D.C. intermittently since 1893. With her husband, Raymond Wilson Hutchinson, a mining engineer, she lived in the mountains of El Salvador for some period of time, 45 miles (72 km) from the Pacific Coast by muleback. The couple had one daughter, Ruth.

In religion, she was a Christian Scientist.

== Selected works ==
=== Books ===
- Your Job Back Home: A Book for Men Leaving the Service, 1919
- In Cloudland, 1920

=== Articles ===
- "Assisting the Returned Soldier", American Machinist (New York, July 31, 1919), vol. 51, no. 5, p. 220 (text)
- "Books for the Navy", Sea Power: Warships, Merchant Marine, Naval Bases (July 1919), Volumes 7-8, no. 1 pp. 30–32 (text)
- "Can Your Children Dress Themselves", Current Magazine, (Wichita, Kansas, July 1928), vol. 1, no. 4. p. 40
- "Children Like Individual Clothers, Too.", Current Magazine, (Wichita, Kansas, July 1928), vol. 1, no. 4. p. 40
- "Comfort and Daintiness for Warm Weather", Current Magazine, (Wichita, Kansas, July 1928), vol. 1, no. 4. p. 40
- "Do Your spring Sewing Early", Current Magazine, (Wichita, Kansas, July 1928), vol. 1, no. 4. p. 40
- "The Leviathan's Machine Shop", American Machinist (New York, April 16, 1925), vol. 62, no. 16, pp. 614–15 (text)
- "Mid-Fall Fashions for Children", Current Magazine, (Wichita, Kansas, July 1928), vol. 1, no. 4. p. 40
- "North Carolina's Contribution to the Winning of the War", American Forestry (November 1918), vol. 24, no. 299, pp. 675–78 (text)
