= Louis Fabian Bachrach Jr. =

American photographer (1917–2010)

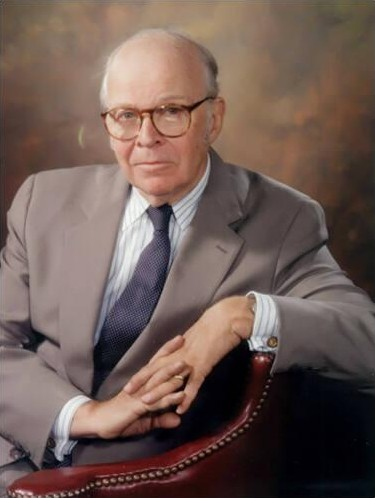
- Born: April 9, 1917; Newton, Massachusetts
- Died: February 26, 2010 (aged 92); Newton, Massachusetts
- Other name: Fabian Bachrach
- Education: Harvard University, B.A. Boston College, M.A.
- Occupation: Photographer
- Employer: Bachrach Studios
- Known for: Bachrach Studios

Louis Fabian Bachrach Jr. (April 9, 1917 – February 26, 2010), who used Fabian Bachrach professionally, was an American photographer known for portraits of celebrities, politicians, business leaders, and other prominent individuals. Bachrach is best known for a photograph of Senator John F. Kennedy that became Kennedy's official portrait after his 1960 election to the presidency.

Bachrach worked in the Boston area. His family, who own Bachrach Studios, has been in the commercial photography business for more than 140 years. Bachrach Studios is believed to be the world's oldest continuously operating photography studio. His paternal grandfather, David Bachrach founded Bachrach Studios in Baltimore, Maryland, in 1868. He had previously photographed Abraham Lincoln during his trip to Gettysburg in 1863 during the U.S. Civil War.

== Biography ==
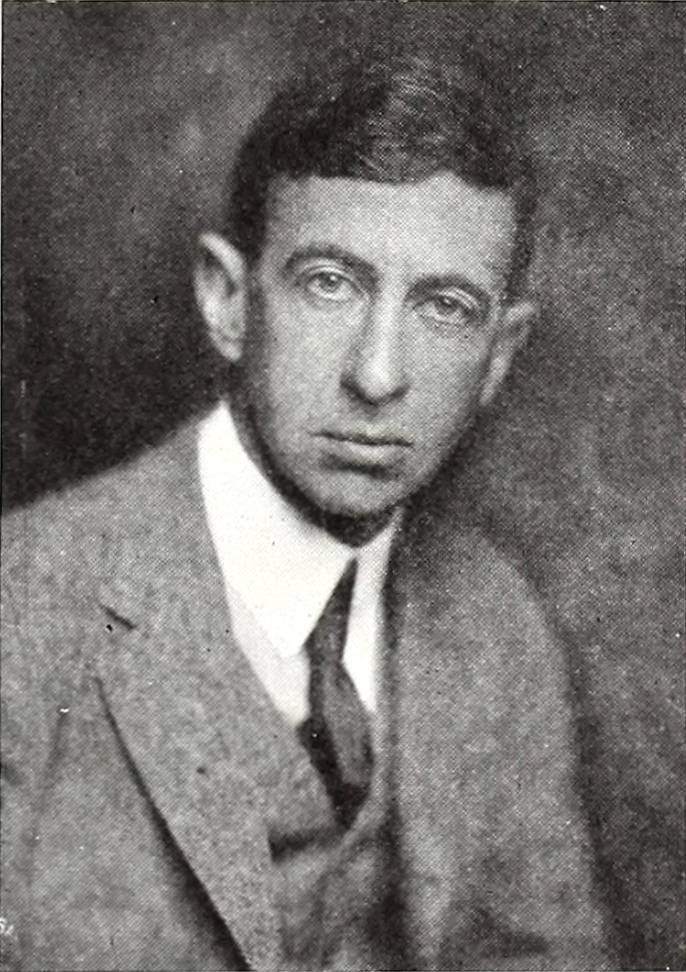
Bachrach's father c. 1919

Louis Fabian Bachrach Jr. was born in Newton, Massachusetts, on April 9, 1917. His father, Louis Fabian Bachrach (1881–1963), was also a photographer. Bachrach received a bachelor's degree in history from Harvard University in 1939 and joined Bachrach Studios shortly afterwards. Bachrach served as an aerial navigator in the United States Navy in the Pacific during World War II. Bachrach later earned a master's degree in Italian literature from Boston College in 1988, when he was in his 70s.

Bachrach introduced color photography to Bachrach Studios during the 1950s, and switched the studios completely to color images during the 1970s.

Fabian Bachrach died of pneumonia on February 26, 2010, in Newton, Massachusetts, at the age of 92.

== Famous subjects ==
Some of Bachrach's most famous subjects included US presidents Richard Nixon and Ronald Reagan, Haitian president Jean-Claude Duvalier, King Faisal of Saudi Arabia, Indian Prime Ministers Indira Gandhi and Jawaharlal Nehru, French oceanographer, filmmaker, and scientist Jacques Cousteau, baseball player Joe DiMaggio, photographer Richard Avedon, poet Robert Frost, philosopher, architect and inventor Buckminster Fuller, politician Ted Kennedy, and boxer Muhammad Ali.

== Bibliography ==
- 1997 Wizards and Their Wonders: Portraits in Computing, written by Christopher Morgan, a collection of historic and current portrait photographs of figures from the computer industry. ACM Press (ISBN 0897919602)
