= David Bachrach =

American photographer (1845-1921)

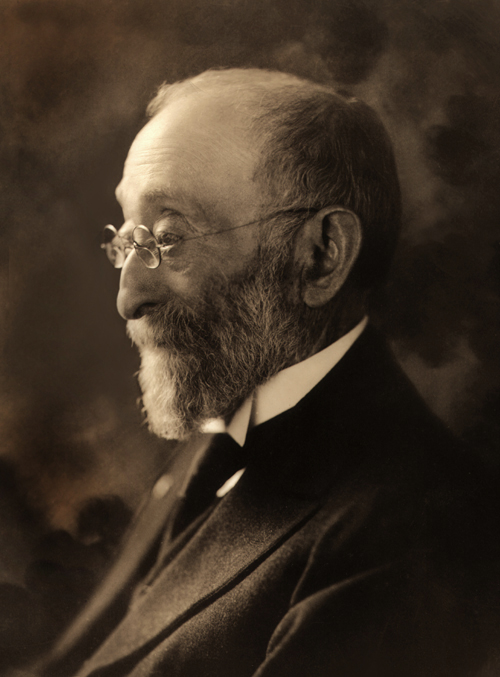
David Bachrach

David Bachrach, Jr. (1845–1921) was an American commercial photographer based in Baltimore, Maryland. He made contributions to the technical, artistic, and professional advancements in the field as well as being the founder of a photographic dynasty that became a unique institution in the United States. He became the spokesman for photographers at the turn of the 20th century who were confronted with a welter of technical and artistic choices. He regularly published in the leading photographic journals of the time and experimented with self-toning papers. He developed the first practical process for photographic printing on canvas, and a forerunner of the present-day photoengraving system. Bachrach, Inc., which was founded in 1910 and is still headed by the Bachrach family, had studios in all the major east coast cities. The Bachrachs, beginning with David, established the idea of "official portraiture," becoming the leading portrait photographers in the United States well into the 1960s.

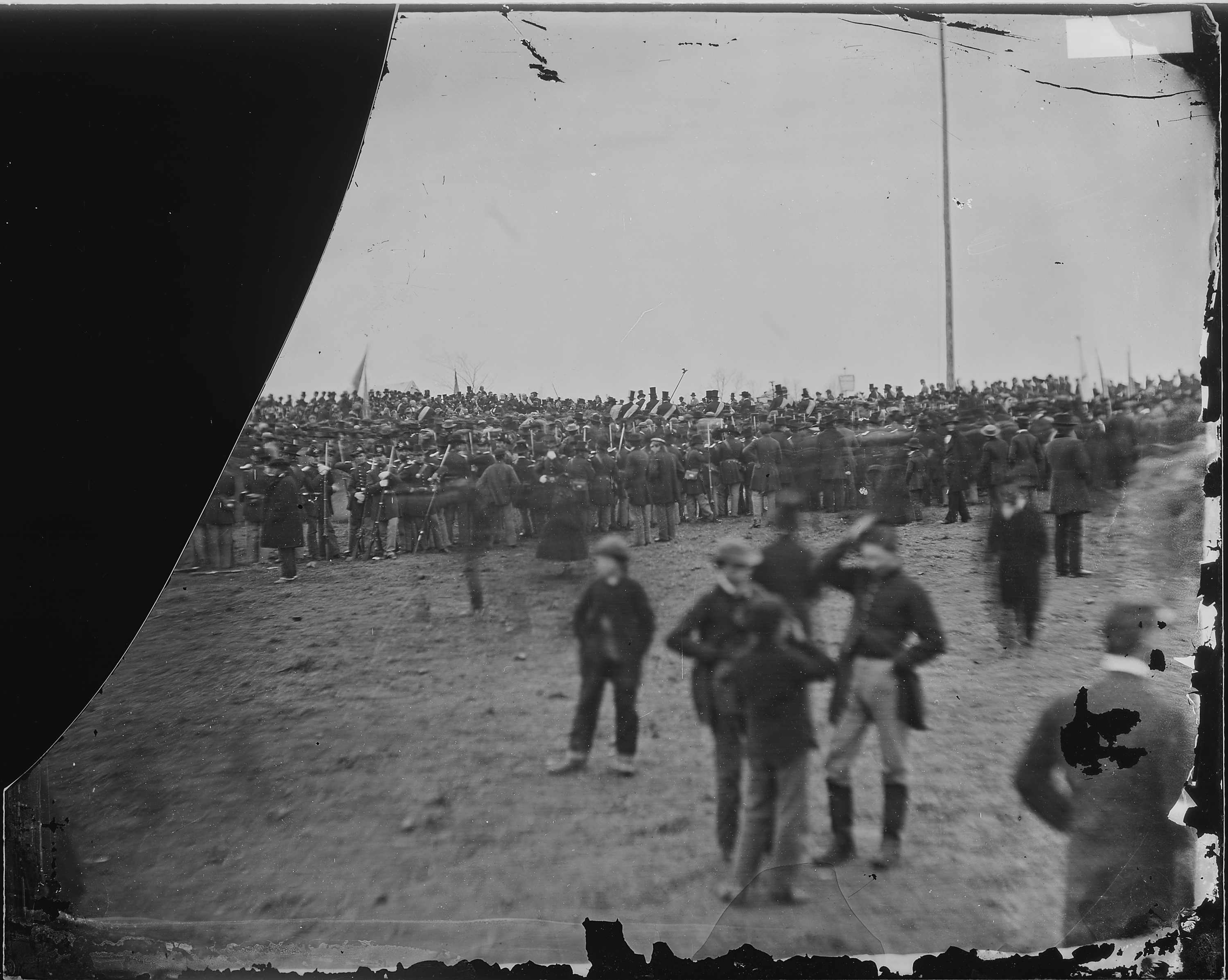
Crowd of citizens, soldiers, and etc. with Lincoln at Gettysburg.

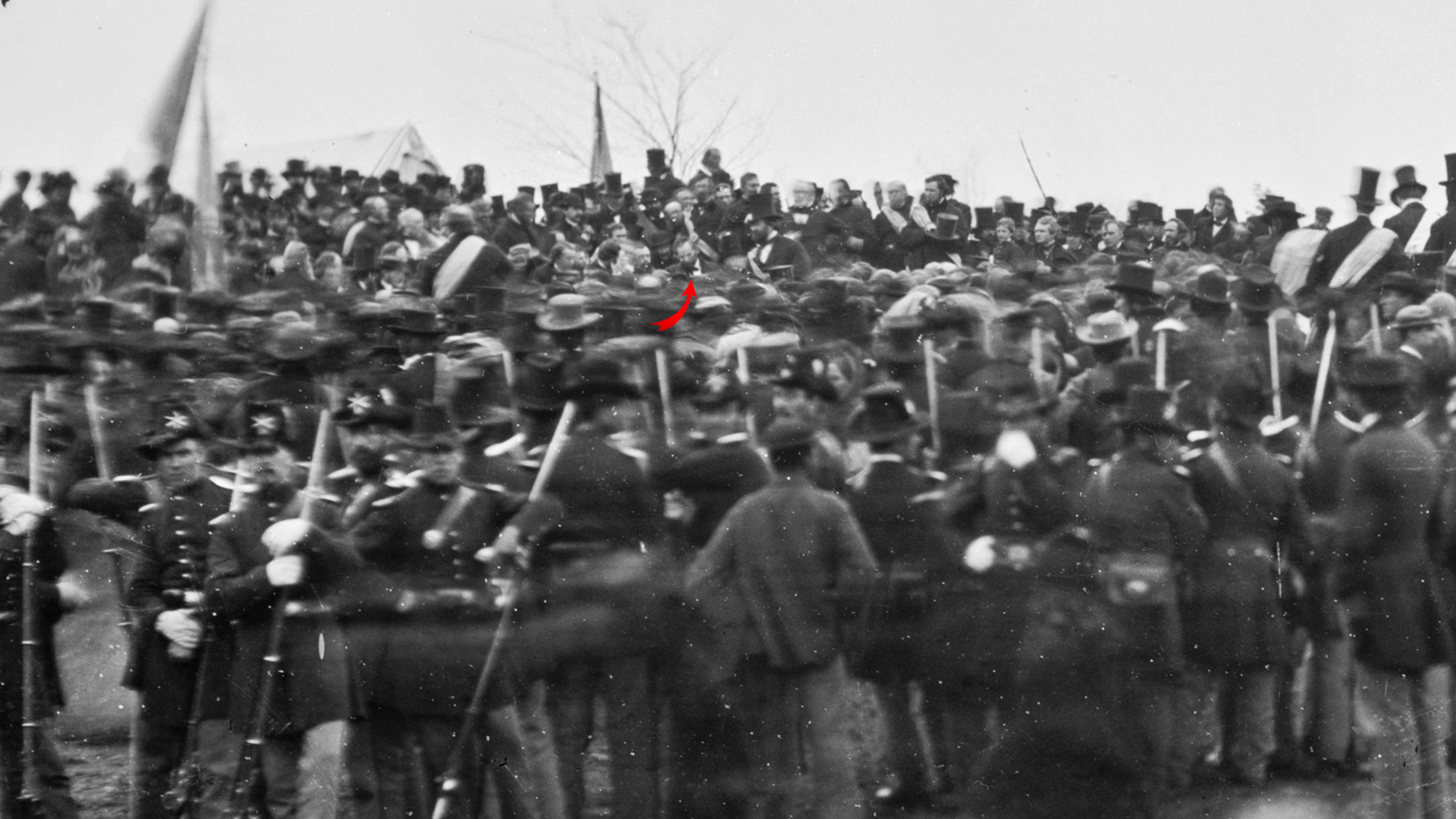
Cropped detail showing Lincoln at Gettysburg.

One of his earliest photographs is of the dedication of the Soldiers' National Cemetery at Gettysburg, Pennsylvania in 1863, when he was 18 years old.

David Bachrach was born in the small town of Neukirchen, in Hesse-Kassel, Germany (according to his obituary in Baltimore newspapers), although some other sources claim he was born further south in Baden-Württemberg, on July 16, 1845, to a Jewish family. He died on December 10, 1921, in Roland Park in Baltimore, and his ashes were interred in the family vault at Baltimore Hebrew Cemetery. He was an uncle of Gertrude Stein.

His home in Baltimore was listed on the National Register of Historic Places in 1985.

== See also ==
- Louis Fabian Bachrach Jr.
