= John Burns (disambiguation) =

John Burns (1858–1943) was an English trade unionist, socialist and politician.

John or Jon Burns may also refer to:

== Entertainment ==
- John Burns (radio presenter) (born 1945), Australian radio presenter on 3AW, Melbourne
- John Burns (sound engineer), British recording engineer and producer since the 1960s
- Jake Burns (born 1958), Irish singer and guitarist for Stiff Little Fingers
- John M. Burns (1938–2023), British comic artist known for his work on Modesty Blaise and Judge Dredd
- John Burns (fictional character), a fictional character on the American sitcom Taxi

== Military ==
- John Horne Burns (1916–1953), American military intelligence officer and novelist
- John L. Burns (1794–1872), American soldier in the War of 1812 and civilian combatant in the Battle of Gettysburg
- John M. Burns (sailor) (1835–1864), American Civil War sailor and Medal of Honor recipient

== Politics ==
- John Burns (California politician) (born 1840), California State Assemblyman
- John A. Burns (1909–1975), American delegate and governor of the state of Hawaii
- John David Burns (born 1936), American President of the Senate of Oregon State from 1971 to 1973
- John Fitzgerald Burns (1833–1911), Australian member of the New South Wales Legislative Assembly
- John H. Burns, American Ambassador to Tanzania
- John J. Burns (Alaska politician) (born 1959), American Attorney General in Alaska
- John J. Burns (New York politician)
- John J. Burns (Vermont politician) (1894–1984), mayor of Burlington, Vermont
- Jon G. Burns (born 1952), American state representative in Georgia

== Sports ==
- John Burns (Australian rules footballer) (born 1949), Australian former North Melbourne centreman
- John Burns (baseball) (1861–?), American baseball player
- John Burns (Irish footballer) (born 1977), Irish footballer
- John Burns (Scottish footballer) (fl. 1911–12), Scottish professional footballer
- John Burns (umpire) (1859–1919), American baseball umpire
- John Burns (weightlifter) (born 1948), British Olympic weightlifter
- John A. Burns (American football) (1916–1968), American football coach
- John Campbell Burns (1880–1941), New Zealand cricketer
- Jake Burns (rugby union) (born 1941), New Zealand rugby union player
- Jake Burns (rugby league) (born 2000), English rugby league player

== Others ==
- John Burns (businessman) (born 1944), British property developer
- John Burns (entomologist), American curator and professor at the Smithsonian Institution
- John Burns (farmer) (1769–1785), youngest brother of the poet Robert Burns.
- John Burns (judge), Australian judge
- John Burns (minister) (1744–1839), Scottish minister
- John Burns (surgeon) (1775–1850), Scottish surgeon
- John Burns, 1st Baron Inverclyde (1829–1901), Scottish ship owner
- John F. Burns (1944–2026), British foreign correspondent for The New York Times

== See also ==
- Burns (surname)
- Jack Burns (disambiguation)
- John Burn (disambiguation)
- John Byrnes (disambiguation)
- John Burns Hynd (1902–1971), British Labour politician
- John David Burnes (born 1988), Canadian archer
