= Consecration of the National Cemetery at Gettysburg =

November 19, 1863 historical event

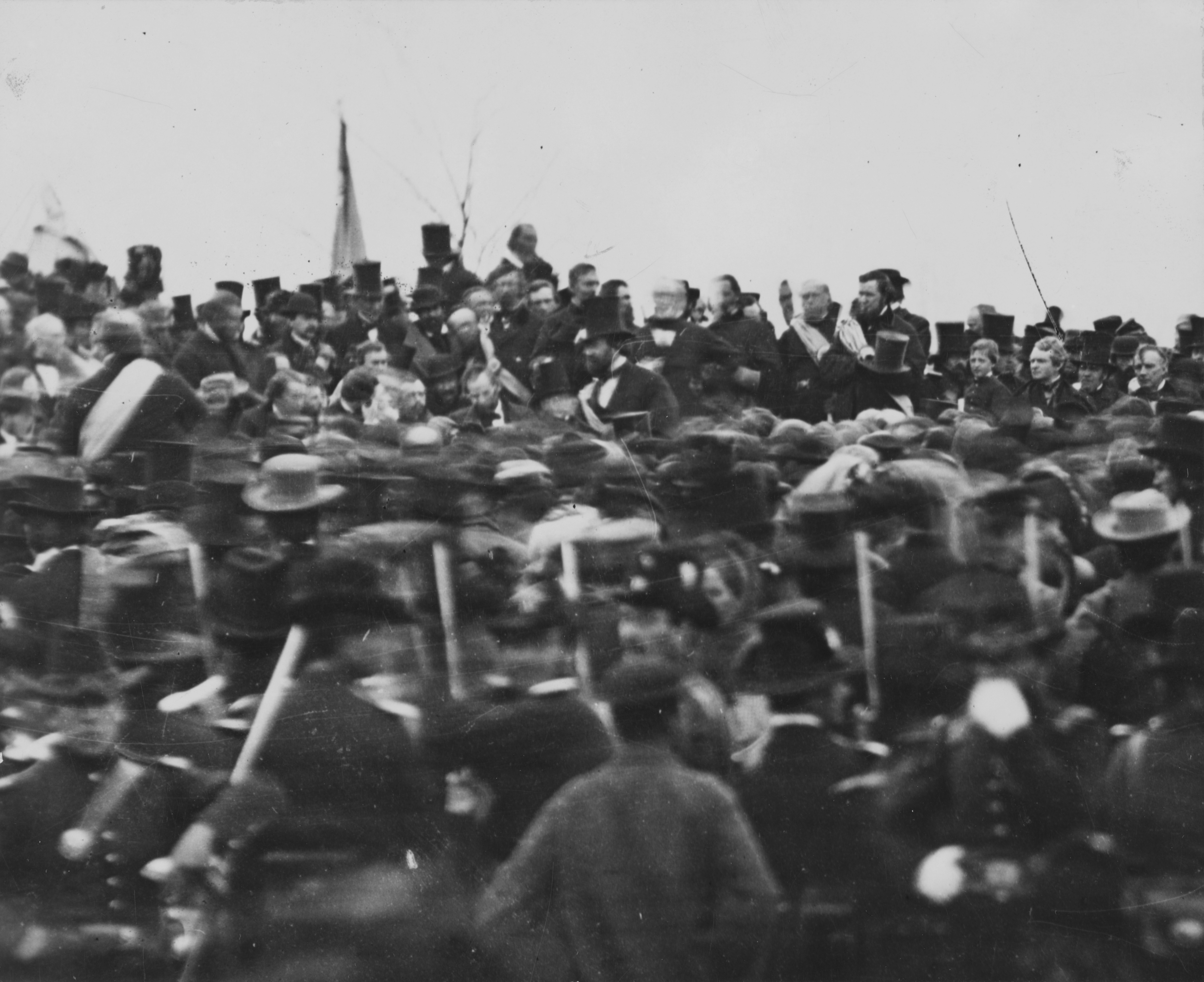
- Abraham Lincoln (center) at the consecration just after arriving c. noon and ~3 hours before the speech. In 2006, two additional Gettysburg procession photographs of Lincoln were identified in the Library of Congress.
- Date: November 19, 1863
- Time: ~3 PM
- Venue: Cemetery Hill, Gettysburg National Cemetery
- Location: Gettysburg, Adams Co, Pennsylvania; 39°49′11″N 77°13′52″W
- Type: Ceremony
- Participants: ~15,000

The Consecration of the Soldiers' National Cemetery was the ceremony at which U.S. president Abraham Lincoln delivered the Gettysburg Address on November 19, 1863. In addition to the 15,000 spectators, attendees included six state governors: Andrew Gregg Curtin of Pennsylvania, Augustus Bradford of Maryland, Oliver P. Morton of Indiana, Horatio Seymour of New York, Joel Parker of New Jersey, and David Tod of Ohio. Reporters present included Joseph Gilbert (Associated Press), Charles Hale (Boston Advertiser), John Russell Young (Philadelphia Press); and Cincinnati Commercial, New York Tribune, & The New York Times reporters.

== Planning ==
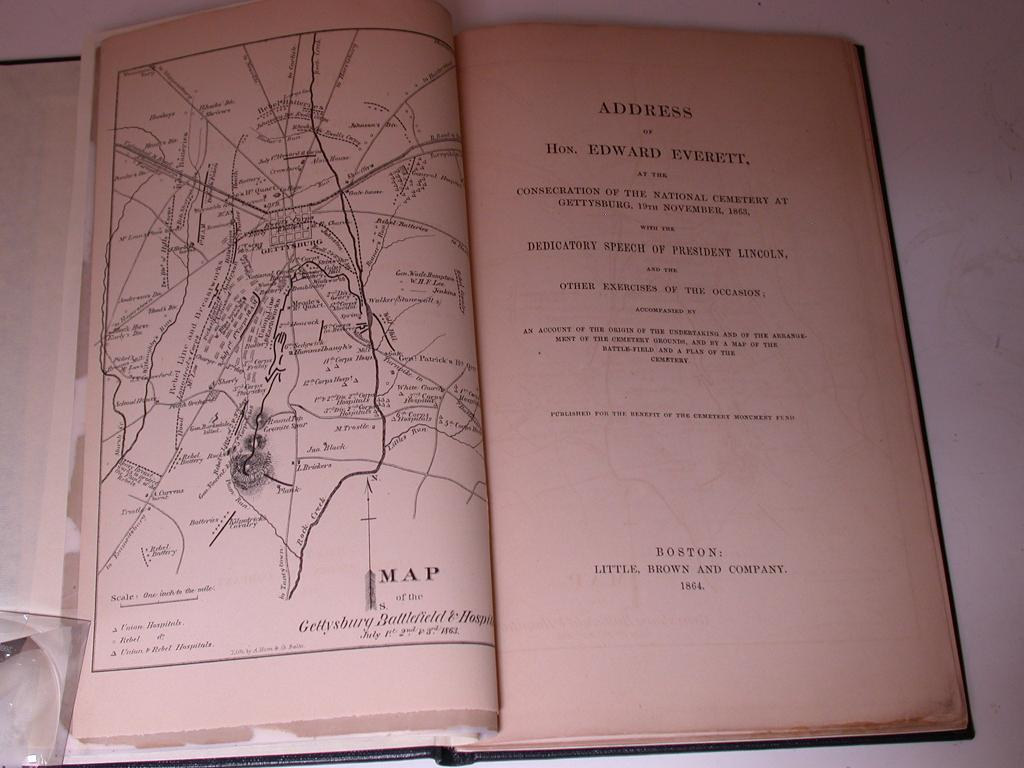
Edward Everett's 1864 book on the "…Consecration of the National Cemetery At Gettysburg…"

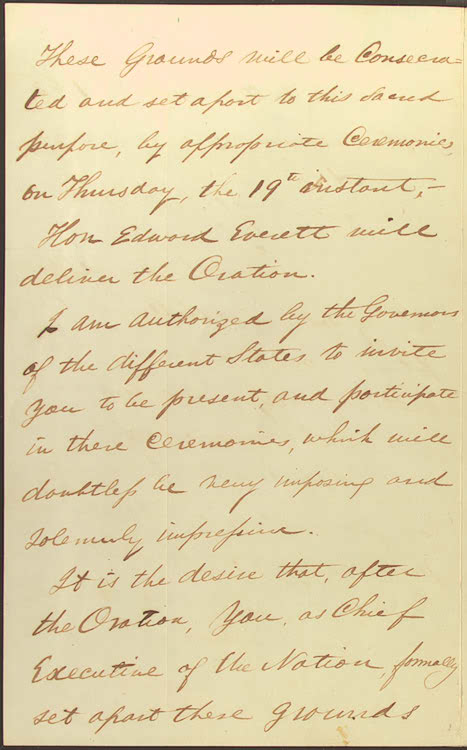
David Wills invitation to Abraham Lincoln: "It is the desire that, after the Oration, you, as Chief Executive of the nation, formally set apart these grounds to their sacred use by a few appropriate remarks."

Following the Battle of Gettysburg, an Evergreen Cemetery Association plan to create a soldiers annex requiring fee payments for interments (e.g., by families) was replaced by a plan by local attorney David Wills for a cemetery funded by the states. The Pennsylvania governor designated Wills the commonwealth's agent, who was authorized to purchase 17 acres (6.9 ha) for a cemetery, paying $2,475.87 for the land ($64,740 as of 2025). Wills' September 23 invitation to the renowned statesman Edward Everett requested an oration on Wednesday, October 23; but Everett needed more time to prepare his speech, which would feature fine details of the battle culled from Everett's personal interviews with those involved. Wills rescheduled the ceremony to Thursday, November 19 to accommodate Everett's needs. On November 2, Lincoln received formal notice of Wills' invitation to participate.

== Preceding events ==
On October 27 from the Presbyterian graveyard on North Washington street (now defunct), the 1st of 3,512 Union Army bodies was moved to the new cemetery. By November 19, a speaker's platform had been constructed, and "1258 had been reburied in the semicircular cemetery".

On November 18 at 6:00 p.m., Abraham Lincoln and party (including his guest, Canadian politician William McDougall) arrived at the Gettysburg Railroad Station. Lincoln walked around the depot and uphill to the town square to spend the night in the Wills' house, where a crowd gathered in the adjacent town square and was addressed by Secretary of State William H. Seward (Everett got to bed about 11 p.m.). After Wills met with Lincoln about the ceremony c. 9:30; Lincoln's door guard, 1st Sgt Hugh Paxton Bigham of Company B (21st PA Cav.), provided a telegram to Lincoln that his son had improved—after which he asked his guard "at about 11 p.m." to take him to Seward. While meeting with Seward at the adjacent Robert Goodloe Harper house "around the corner", Lincoln was serenaded by the Baltimore Glee Club (National Union Musical Association) with We Are Coming, Father Abra'am (Bigham later "pushed" a return path through the crowd for Lincoln). Also posted through the night was a second military guard for Lincoln at the street-level door, Paxton's brother Rush Bigham.

On November 19 c. 9 a.m. when his secretary went to Lincoln's room, "Mr. Nicolay…found him at work upon the address which he was to deliver. He continued to write, so far as the many interruptions gave him opportunity, up to the time it was necessary for him to take his place in the procession". At 9:30 a.m., Lincoln on a chestnut bay horse joined the procession to the cemetery with other dignitaries, townspeople, and widows. "We passed along Baltimore Street to the Emmittsburg Road, minute guns being fired, then by way of the Taneytown Road to the cemetery, where the military formed in line to salute the President at about eleven o'clock."

== Program ==
Scheduled events for the ceremony included:

Music, by Birgfield's Band
Prayer, by Reverend T.H. Stockton, D.D.
The cloudy day became sunny during the reverend's prayer.
Music, by the Marine Band
Oration, by Hon. Edward Everett
Everett's two-hour delivery of 13,607 words described the battle and related its events and the war to previous wars and events.
Music, Hymn composed by Benjamin Brown French, Esq.
"A full view of the battlefield, with the Blue [Ridge] Mountains in the distance, was spread out before us, and all about were traces of the fierce conflict. Rifle pits, cut and scarred trees, broken fences, pieces of artillery wagons and harness, scraps of blue and gray clothing, bent canteens, abandoned knapsacks, belts, cartridge boxes, shoes and caps, were still to be seen on nearly every side—a great showing for relic hunters. … The Baltimore Glee Club then sang an ode written for the occasion by Commissioner B. B. French, of Washington, and Lincoln arose."
Dedicatory Remarks, by the President of the United States
Dirge, sung by Choir selected for the occasion
Benediction, by Reverend H.L. Baugher, D.D.
Lincoln took but a few minutes for the "Address delivered at the dedication of the cemetery at Gettysburg" (Boston reporter Charles Hale "took down the slow-spoken words of the President").

The program ended c. 4 p.m. and, after attending most of a subsequent service at the Presbyterian church with War of 1812 and Battle of Gettysburg veteran John L. Burns, Lincoln departed via the Gettysburg Railroad c. 6 p.m.

== Aftermath ==
Following the ceremony, telegraphy regarding the program included at least three transmissions of Lincoln's address. The New York Times report the next day included both Lincoln's address and the entire Everett Oration.

Wills requested a copy of Everett's oration via a December 14 letter, and Everett provided a copy with footnotes (e.g., describing the maps he used while composing). In 1864, Everett published his book regarding the consecration; and an 1867 record of the consecration ceremony was published with the associated correspondence.

Erected by the Gettysburg National Military Park (G.N.M.P.), a permanent historical marker within the Gettysburg National Cemetery states, "The speakers' platform was located in Evergreen Cemetery to your left." The National Park Service's National Cemetery Walking Tour brochure concurs with the permanent marker:

The Soldiers' National Monument, long misidentified as the spot from which Lincoln spoke, honors the fallen soldiers. ... It was actually on the crown of this hill, a short distance on the other side of the iron fence and inside the Evergreen Cemetery, where President Lincoln delivered the Gettysburg Address to a crowd of some 15,000 people.

As recently as January 23, 2004, a multiple property submission by the GNMP extended the long history of misidentification by stating, the Soldiers' National Monument "Sits on site of speaker's platform where Gettysburg Address was orated." Photographic analyses by Garry Wills and William A. Frassanito, completed in 1992 and 1995 respectively, conclusively place the location on the Evergreen Cemetery side of the dividing fence.
