= John Byrne =

John or Johnny Byrne may refer to:

== Arts and entertainment ==
- John Byrne (English artist) (1786–1847), English painter and printmaker
- Johnny Byrne (writer) (1935–2008), former BBC editor and script writer
- John Byrne (playwright) (1940–2023), Scottish playwright and artist
- John Byrne (musician) (1946–2008), Irish-born American musician
- John Byrne (cartoonist) (born 1950), English-born American comic book artist and writer
- John Byrne (Irish artist) (born 1959), Irish performance and multimedia artist
- John Byrne (columnist), British writer and broadcaster

== Politics ==
- John Byrne (Irish politician) (1878–1942), Irish Cumann na nGaedhael politician
- John F. Byrne Sr. (1911–1965), American politician, member of Philadelphia City Council
- John F. Byrne Jr. (born 1935), American politician, member of the Pennsylvania State Senate, son of the above

== Sports ==
=== Association football ===
- John Byrne (Scottish footballer) (born 1939), Scottish footballer
- Johnny Byrne (footballer) (1939–1999), England international footballer, soccer coach in South Africa
- John Byrne (footballer, born 1949), English footballer for Tranmere Rovers
- John Byrne (footballer, born 1961), English-born footballer for QPR, Sunderland and the Republic of Ireland
- John Byrne (footballer, born 1962), Irish footballer

=== Other sports ===
- John Byrne (Australian footballer) (born 1956), Australian rules footballer for North Melbourne
- John Byrne (cricketer) (born 1972), Irish cricketer
- Jon Byrne (born 1983), Australian-born baseball umpire

== Others ==
- John Byrne (VC) (1832–1879), Irish recipient of the Victoria Cross
- John Edgar Byrne (1842–1906), Australian journalist and newspaper proprietor
- John Francis Byrne, creator of the Chaocipher
- Jock Byrne (John Thomas Byrne, 1903–1969), Scottish trade unionist and anti-communist
- John Byrne (businessman) (1919–2013), Irish property developer
- John V. Byrne (1928–2024), American marine geologist and academic
- John J. Byrne (1931–2013), American insurance industry executive
- John Byrne (computer scientist) (1933–2016), Irish computer scientist
- John H. Byrne (born 1946), American neuroscientist
- John Byrne (judge) (born 1948), Senior Judge Administrator of the Supreme Court of Queensland
- John K. Byrne (born 1981), founder of the Raw Story news website

== See also ==
- Jack Byrne (disambiguation)
- John Burn (disambiguation)
- John Byrnes (disambiguation)
- Byrne, surname
