= Evergreen Cemetery gatehouse =

Historic structure in Adams County, Pennsylvania

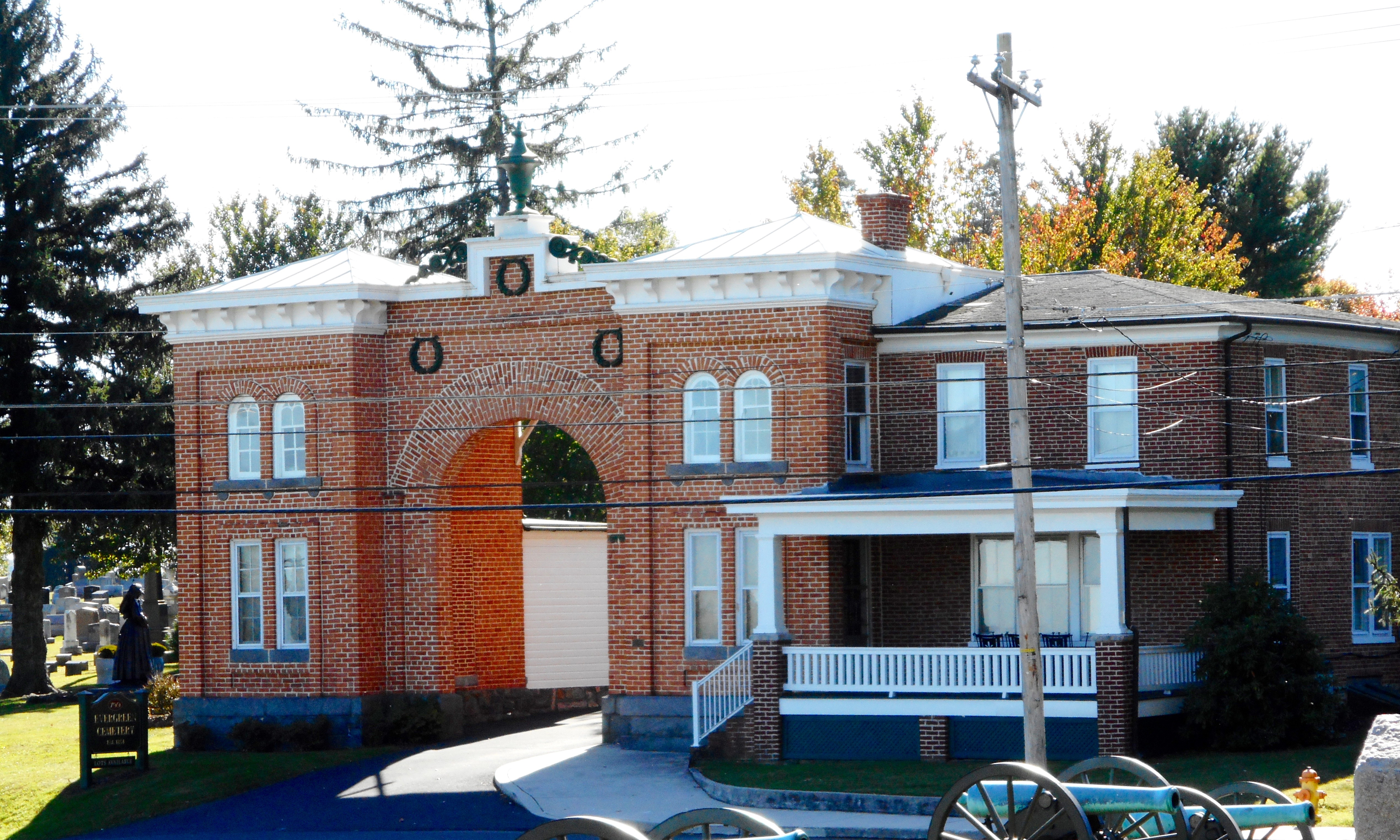
- Interactive map of the Evergreen Cemetery gatehouse area

General information
- Type: Historic district contributing structure
- Architectural style: Italianate
- Location: 799 Baltimore Pike, United States
- Coordinates: 39.82076°N 77.22935°W
- Opened: September 1, 1855

Technical details
- Material: brick

Design and construction
- Architect: Stephen Decatur Button

Evergreen Cemetery gatehouse (1855) is a historic building located at 799 Baltimore Pike in Adams County, Pennsylvania, United States. During the American Civil War, the gatehouse played an important role in the July 1 to 3, 1863 Battle of Gettysburg. It is a contributing structure in Gettysburg Battlefield Historic District.

== History ==
=== Evergreen Cemetery ===
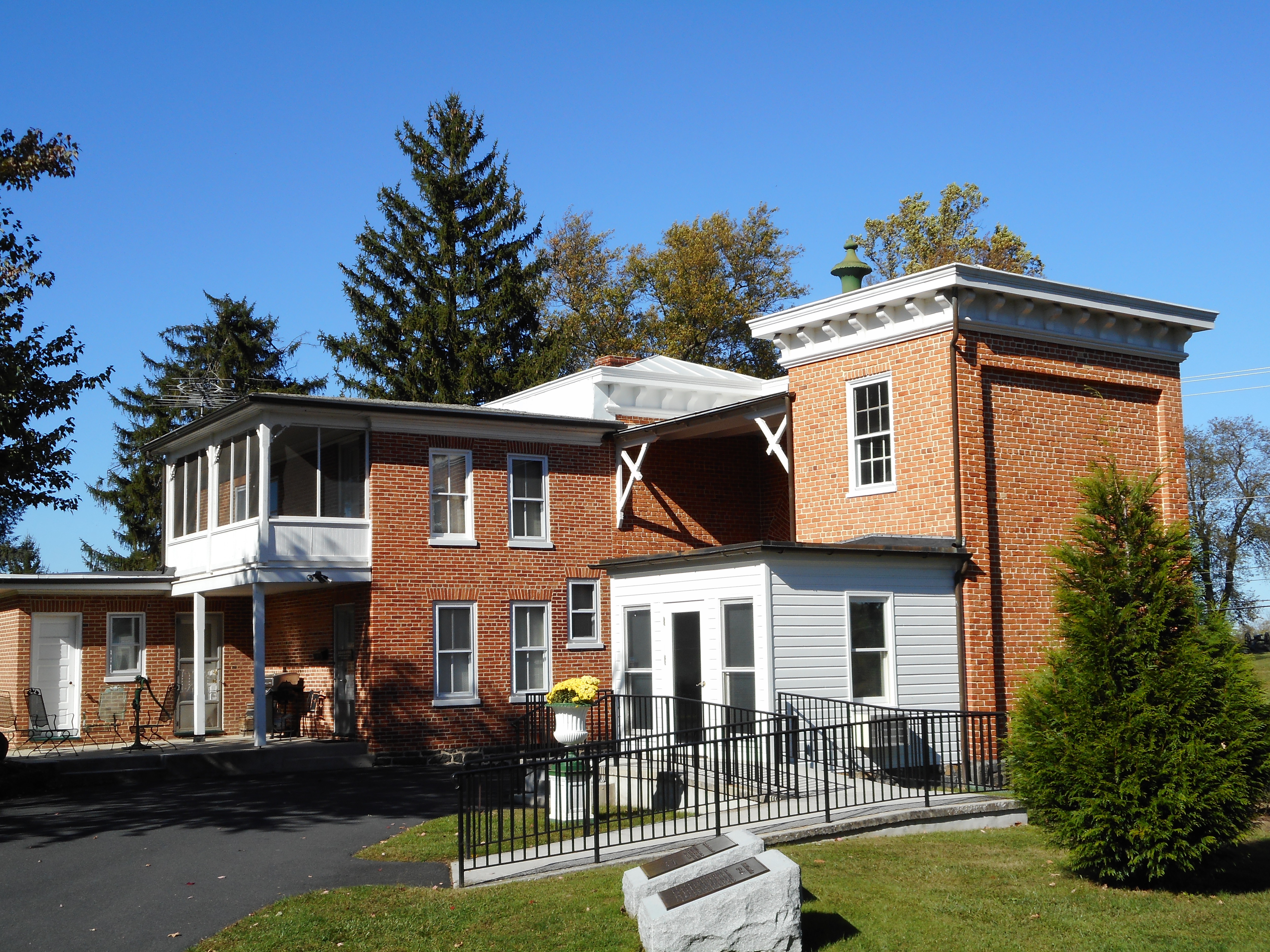
Rear of the gatehouse

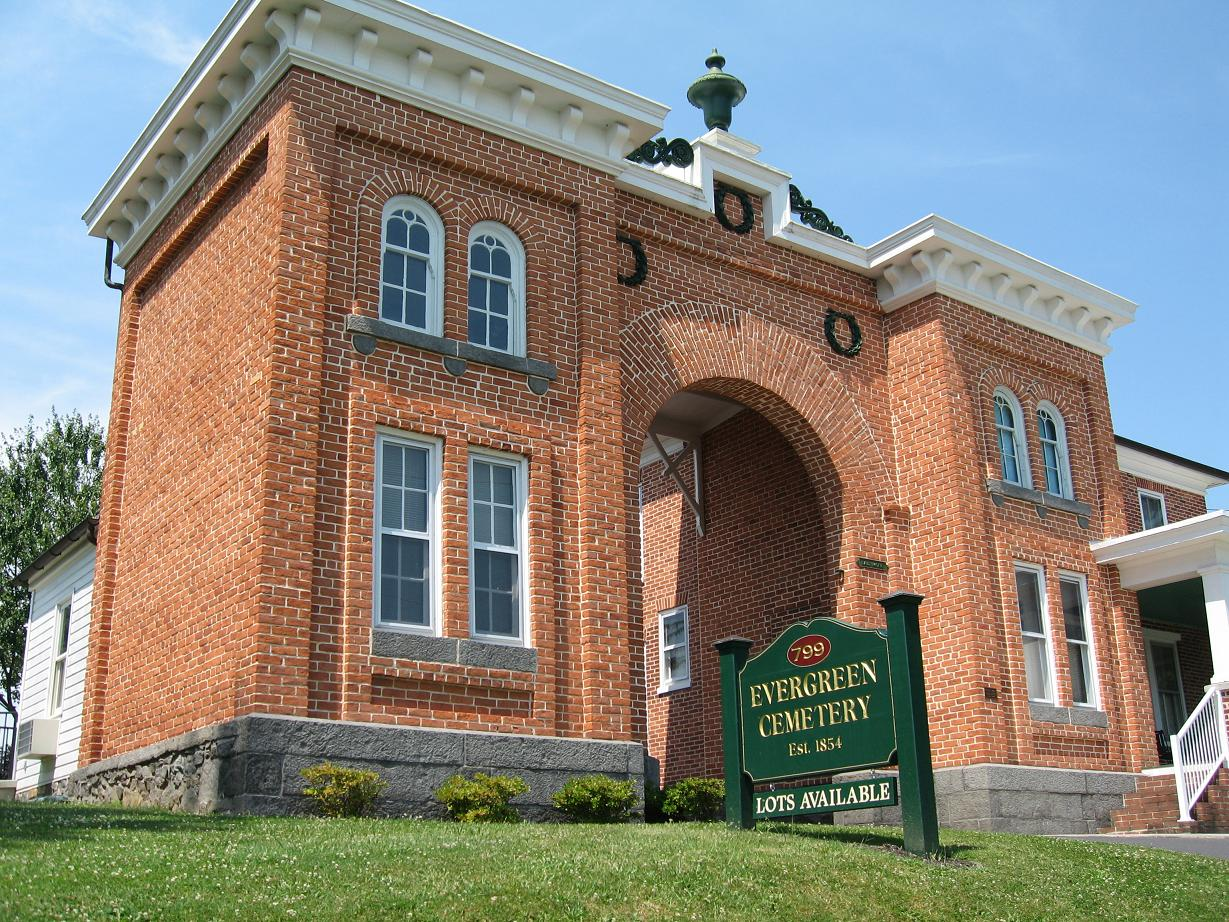
Front of the gatehouse, emphasizing the appearance during the Battle

Evergreen Cemetery occupies a hill just south of Gettysburg Borough, between Baltimore Pike and Tanneytown Road. The Ever Green Cemetery Association of Gettysburg was chartered in 1853. It remains a private cemetery to this day.

Philadelphia architect Stephen Decatur Button designed the cemetery's gatehouse in mid-1855, and its cornerstone was laid by Reverend Samuel Simon Schmucker on September 1. Local masons George and Henry Chritzman constructed the brick building in less than 3 months, at a cost of $1,025. The gatehouse served as the cemetery's office, and as the residence of its caretaker.

=== Battle of Gettysburg ===
Battle of East Cemetery Hill

Recognizing the enormous strategic advantage of the cemetery's high ground, Major-General Oliver Otis Howard lined his artillery along what came to be known as "Cemetery Hill," facing north and west. On the opposite side of Baltimore Pike, his artillery faced north and east. Howard made the cemetery's gatehouse into XI Corps (Union Army) headquarters, and occupied the building for all three days of the battle.

On July 1, Gettysburg Borough was evacuated, and the telegraph key from Gettysburg Railroad Station was moved to near the gatehouse, to keep communications open. That night, Elizabeth Thorn, wife of the cemetery's caretaker, prepared a fine dinner for General Howard, General Sickles, and General Slocum.

At dusk on July 2, 5 Louisiana regiments under Brigadier-General Harry T. Hays and 3 North Carolina regiments under Colonel Isaac E. Avery commenced the Battle of East Cemetery Hill, charging the Union artillery batteries from the east. Historian Frederick Hawthorne wrote of Howard's successful defense: “Lying in reserve in the Evergreen Cemetery, they (73rd Pennsylvania Infantry) rushed out through the cemetery gateway to help drive the Confederates away from Rickett’s and Weidrich’s batteries.”

=== Post-battle ===
Evergreen Cemetery gatehouse survived the Battle of Gettysburg. In the battle's aftermath, Elizabeth Thorn buried approximately one hundred fallen soldiers in the vicinity. Structural repairs were made to the building in 1885, when the "lodge" addition was built.

In 1972, the "Evergreen Cemetery archway house" was designated an historic district contributing structure by the Gettysburg Borough Council (1 of 38 outside of the borough).
