= Evergreen Cemetery (Adams County, Pennsylvania) =

Historic cemetery in Adams County, Pennsylvania

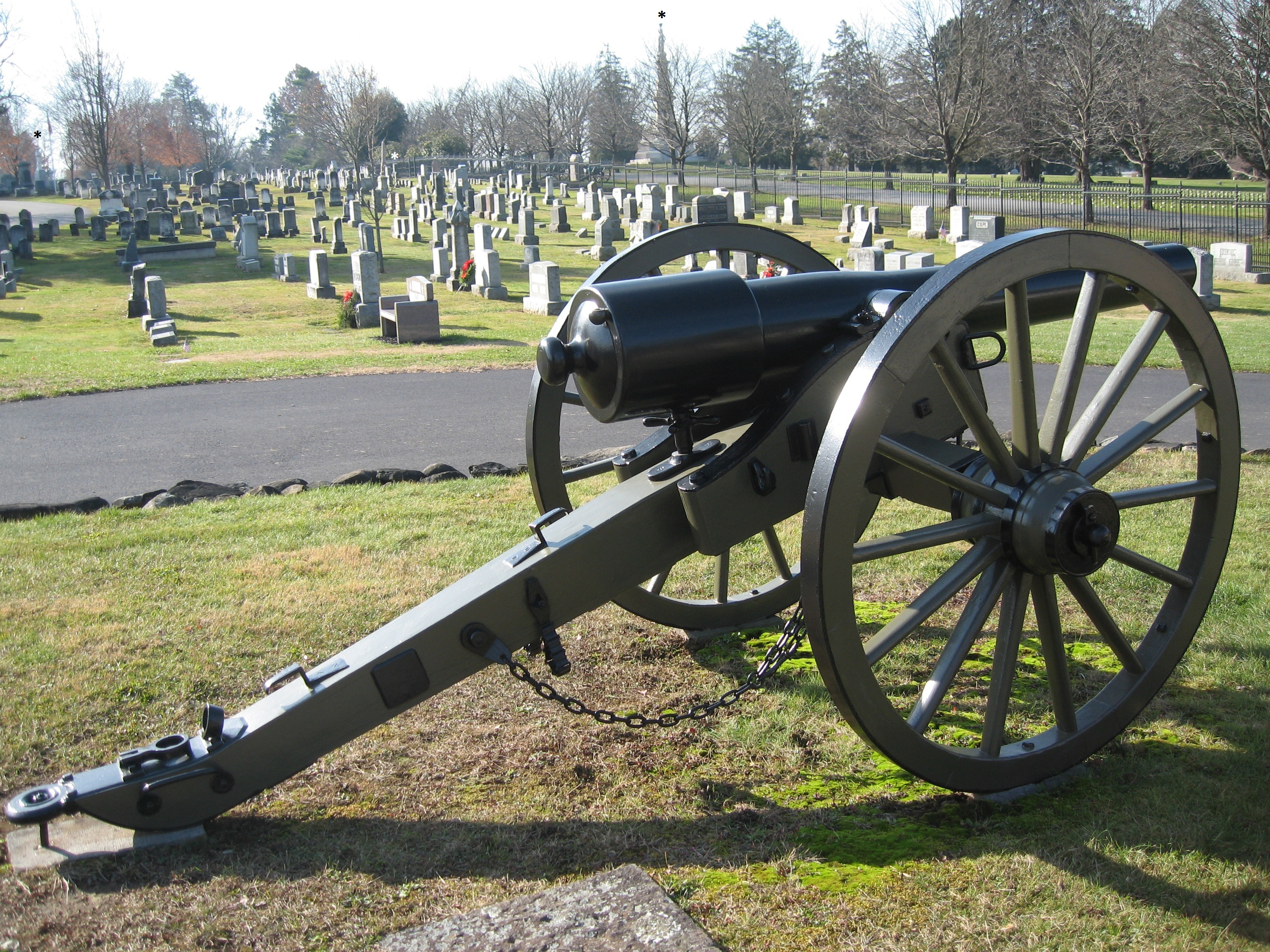
- Ginnie Wade Monument, location of platform for Gettysburg Address and Soldiers National Monument (L to R) are marked on the horizon. The oldest section (A) of the cemetery appears behind the Parrott rifled cannon.
- Interactive map of Evergreen Cemetery

Details
- Established: 1854
- Location: Cumberland Township, Adams County, Pennsylvania
- Country: United States
- Coordinates: 39°49′08″N 77°13′49″W
- Size: 17.65 acres (7.14 ha)
- Find a Grave: Evergreen Cemetery

Evergreen Cemetery – formerly called Citizen's Cemetery and Ever Green Cemetery – is a historic 29.12 acre rural cemetery located just outside Gettysburg Borough, in Cumberland Township, Adams County, Pennsylvania, United States. It is part of Gettysburg Battlefield Historic District, and is surrounded by Gettysburg National Military Park and Soldiers' National Cemetery.

The cemetery played a strategic role in the July 1 to 3, 1863 Battle of Gettysburg. Four months after the battle, at the dedication of the immediately-adjacent National Cemetery, President Abraham Lincoln delivered his "Gettysburg Address" from a platform in Evergreen Cemetery.

== History ==
=== Founding ===
The Ever Green Cemetery Association of Gettysburg was established at a November 29, 1853 meeting. The association managed the property and oversaw selection of its caretakers. By April 3, 1854, 118 lots had been sold, and the association members' first payments were due. The first interment took place on October 29. Opening ceremonies were held on November 7, 1854, and in his dedication address Reverend John H. C. Dosh asked, "Could a more lovely spot have been chosen?"

The Evergreen Cemetery gatehouse was designed by Philadelphia architect Stephen Decatur Button, built by local contractors George and Henry Chritzman, and completed in November 1855. The Italianate gatehouse served as the caretaker residence.

=== Battle of Gettysburg ===
Battle of East Cemetery Hill, July 2, 1863

Evergreen Cemetery is eponymous with Cemetery Hill, the landform noted as the keystone of the Union position during the Battle of Gettysburg. Major-General Oliver Otis Howard lined the cemetery's high ground with cannons, turning it into an "artillery platform," and made its gatehouse into XI Corps (Union Army) headquarters.

At dusk on July 2, 5 Louisiana regiments under Brigadier-General Harry T. Hays and 3 North Carolina regiments under Colonel Isaac E. Avery commenced the Battle of East Cemetery Hill, charging Howard's artillery batteries from the east. "Federal soldiers in the Cemetery laid many of the tombstones on the ground" to limit damage, and some of the XI Corps batteries and infantry used the grave monuments "for shelter from the enemy's fire". Historian Frederick Hawthorne wrote of Howard's successful defense: “Lying in reserve in the Evergreen Cemetery, they (73rd Pennsylvania Infantry) rushed out through the cemetery gateway to help drive the Confederates away from Rickett’s and Weidrich’s batteries.”

Evergreen experienced three days as battlefield, and its resulting condition inspired a Union officer to lament: "A beautiful cemetery it was, but now is trodden down, laid a waste, desecrated. The fences are all down, the many graves have been run over, beautiful lots with iron fences and splendid monuments have been destroyed or soiled, and our infantry and artillery occupy those sacred grounds where the dead are sleeping. It is enough to make one mourn."

Two Confederate soldiers mortally wounded during the battle were buried in Evergreen Cemetery.

=== Post-battle ===
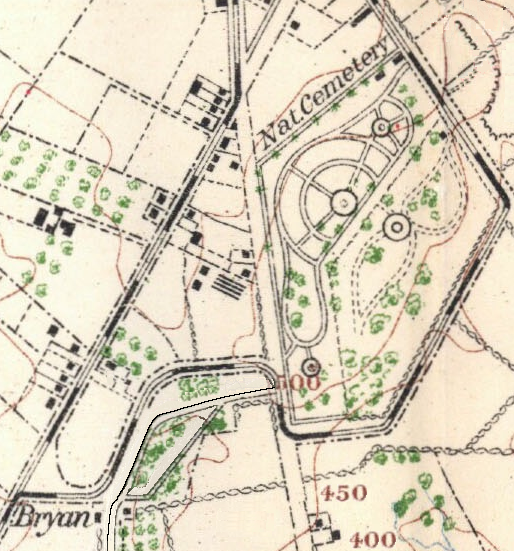
Detail of a 1904 map showing the National Cemetery (semi-circles right of center) and Evergreen Cemetery (right)

The Consecration of the National Cemetery at Gettysburg took place on November 19, 1863. The speaker's platform used by orator Edward Everett, and then by President Abraham Lincoln to deliver his Gettysburg Address, was located just east of the National Cemetery, on the grounds of Evergreen Cemetery.

From 1893 to 1916, the Gettysburg Electric Railway operated along the cemetery's east and south borders. Following the 1917 demolition of the trolley railway, Evergreen Cemetery expanded southward.

In 1972, the "Evergreen Cemetery archway house" was designated an historic district contributing structure by the Gettysburg Borough Council (1 of 38 outside of the borough). Civilian remains at the site of the 1804 Associate Reformed Presbyterian Church cemetery were reinterred at Evergreen Cemetery in 1992.

== Photo gallery ==
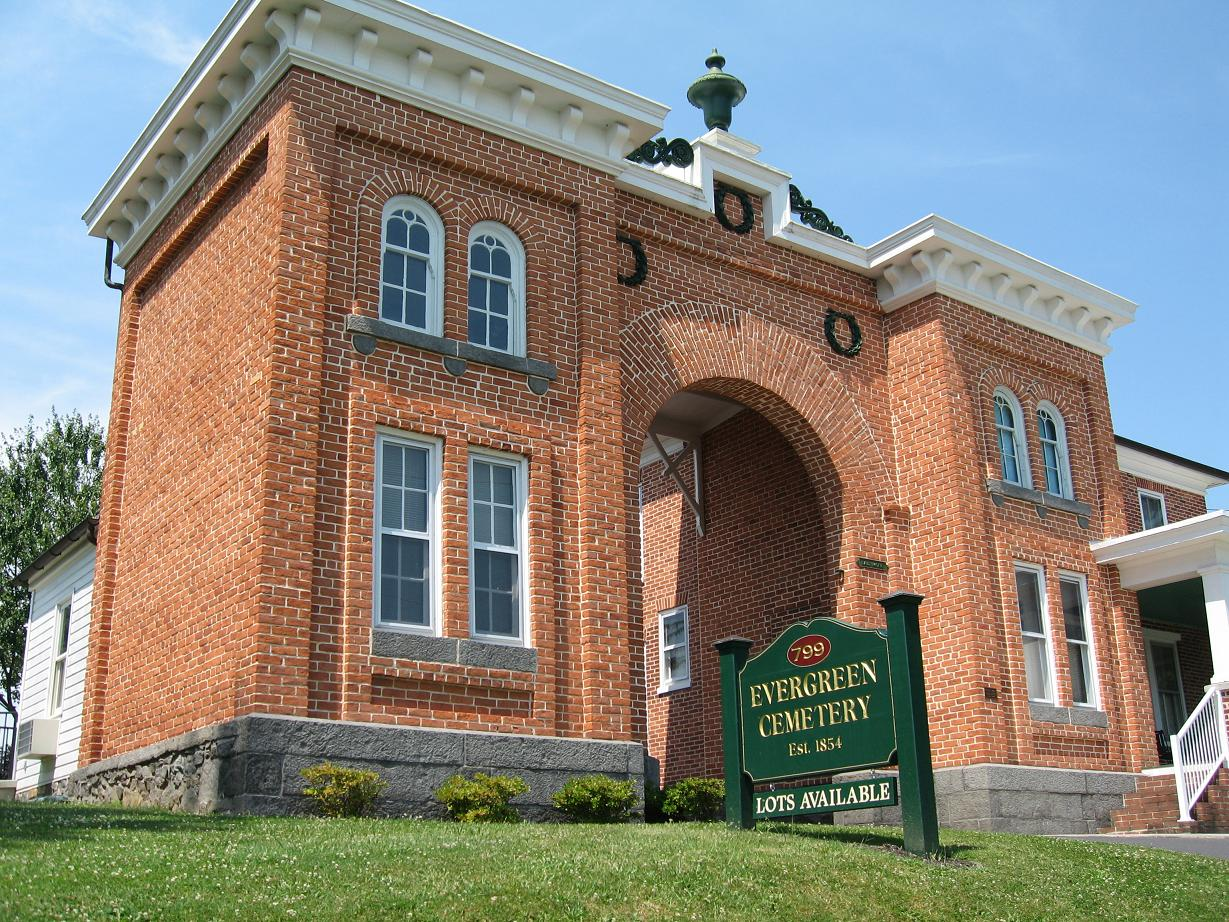
Gatehouse

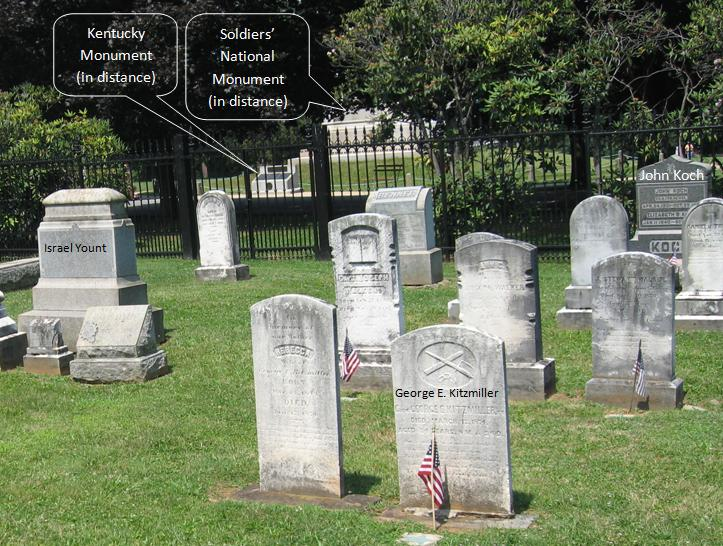
The only published photographic analysis places the site of the platform for the Gettysburg Address at the graves of George Kitzmiller, Israel Yount and John Koch.

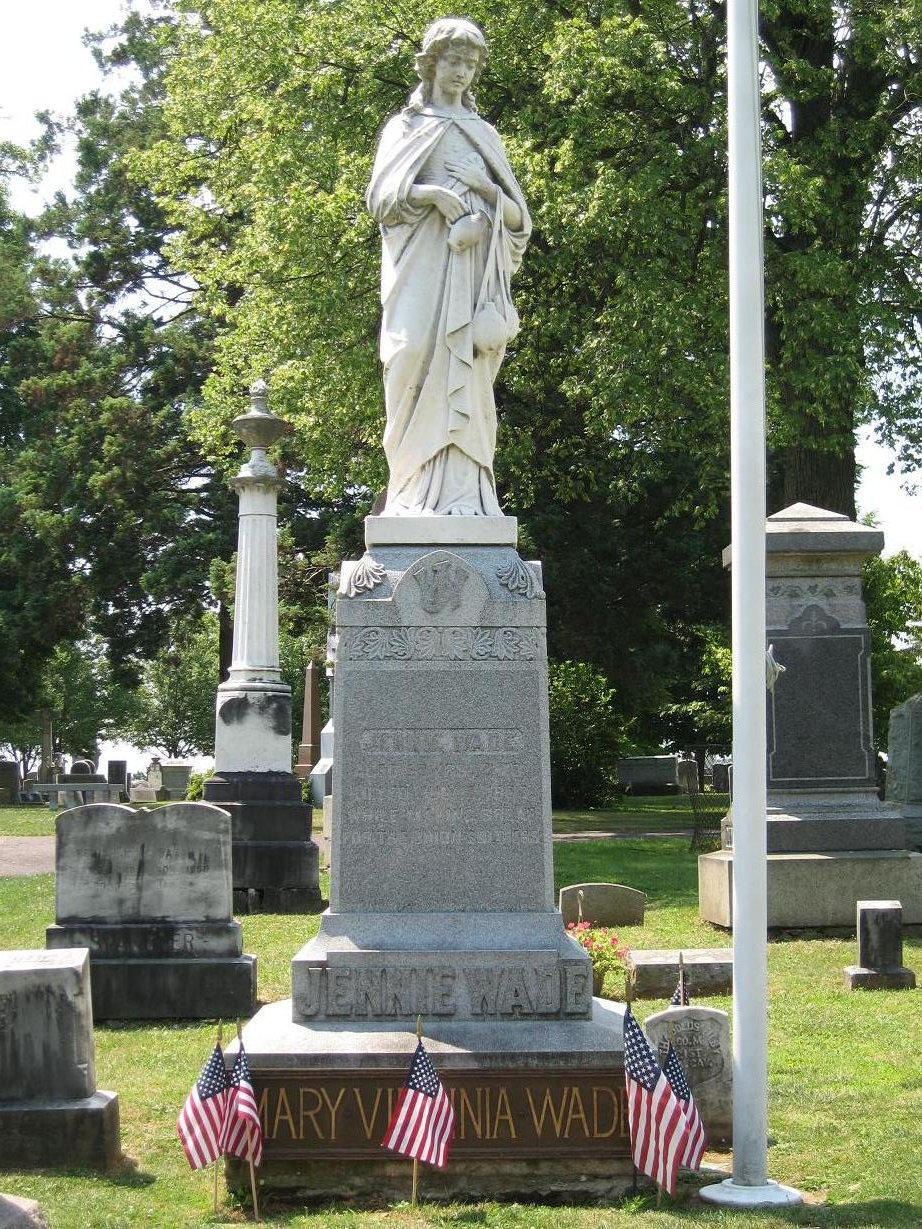
Ginnie Wade, lone civilian casualty of the Battle of Gettysburg

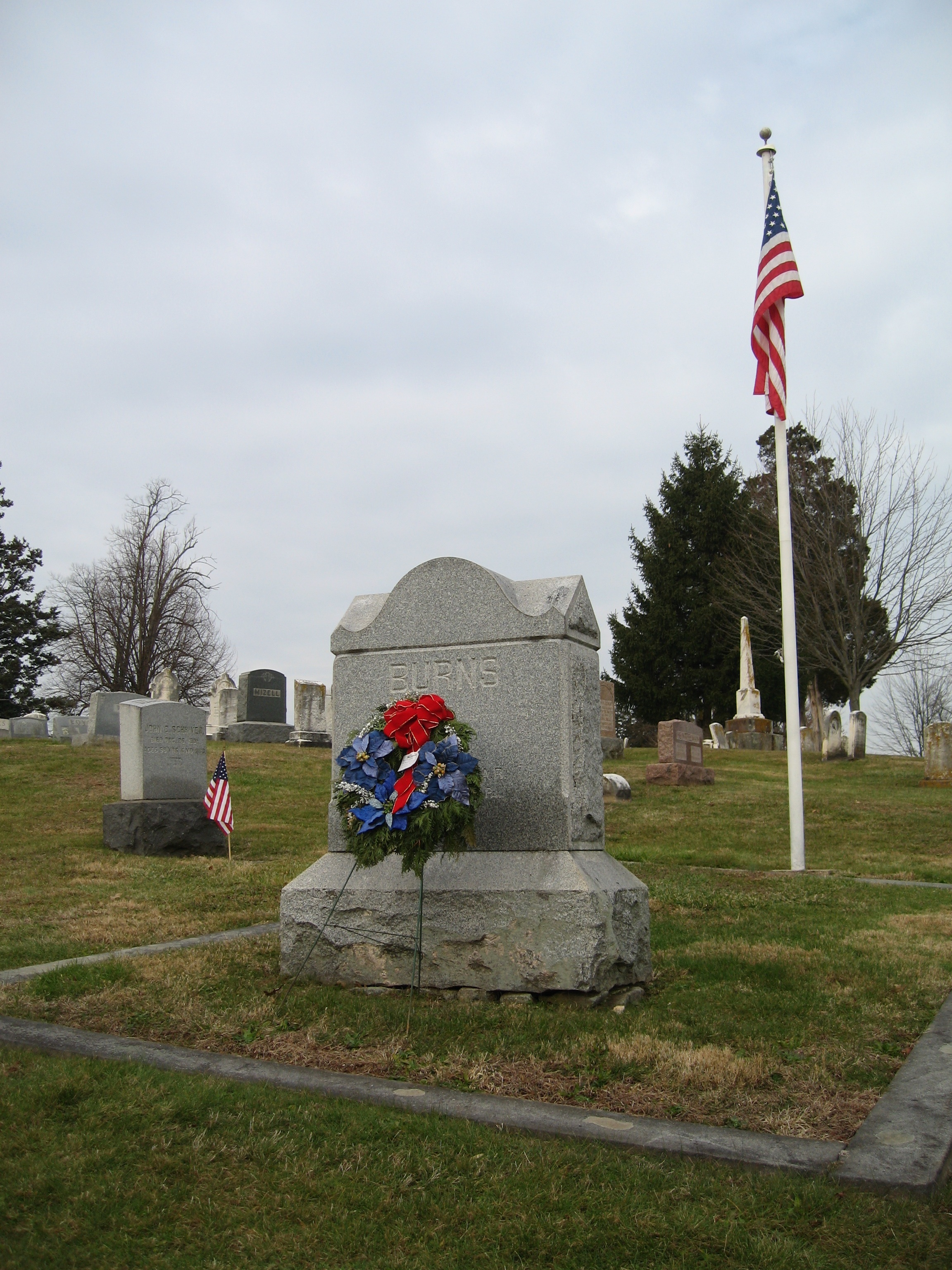
John L. Burns, geriatric civilian combatant at the Battle of Gettysburg

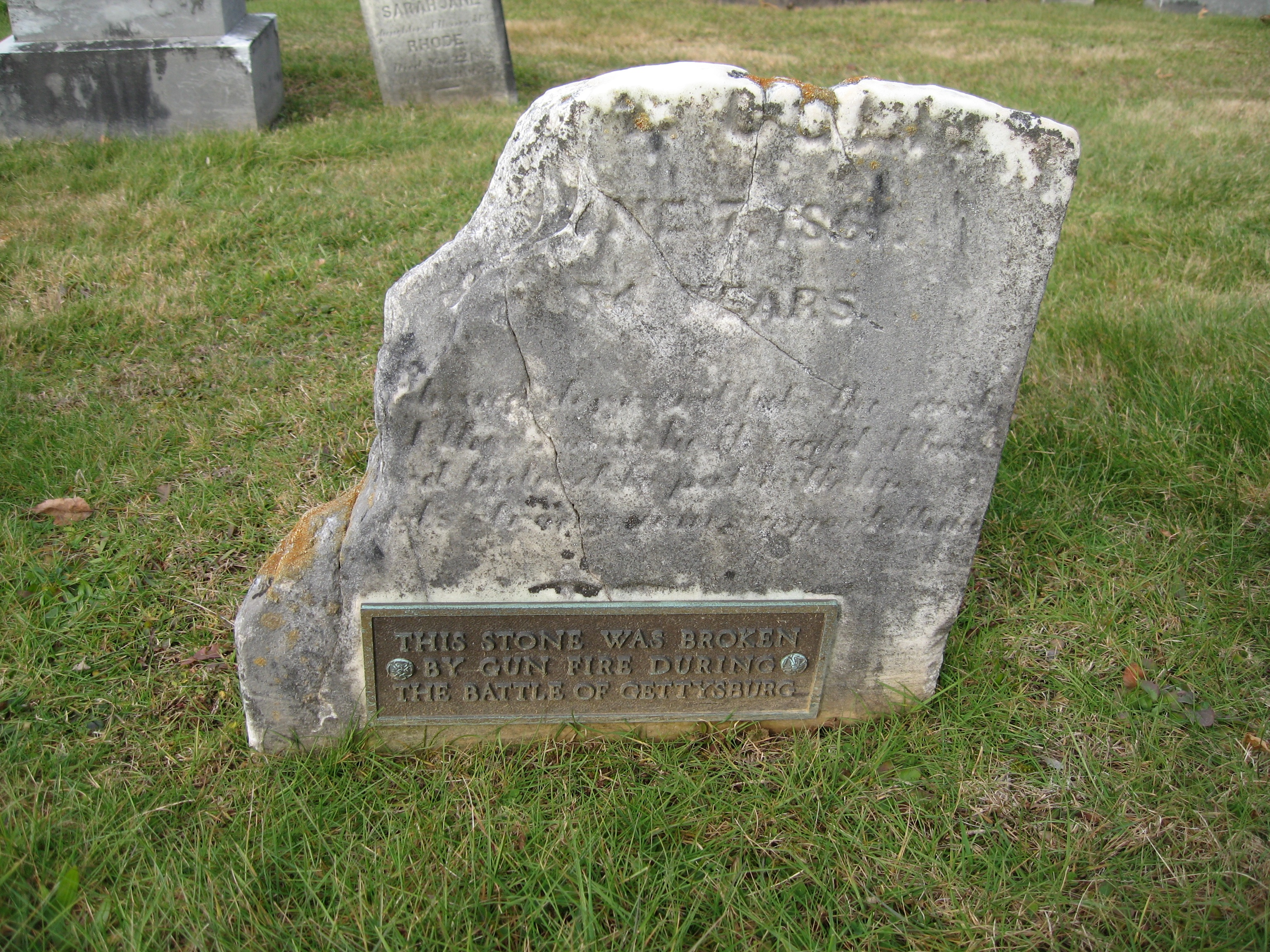
Esaias Jesse Culp's headstone shows battle damage.

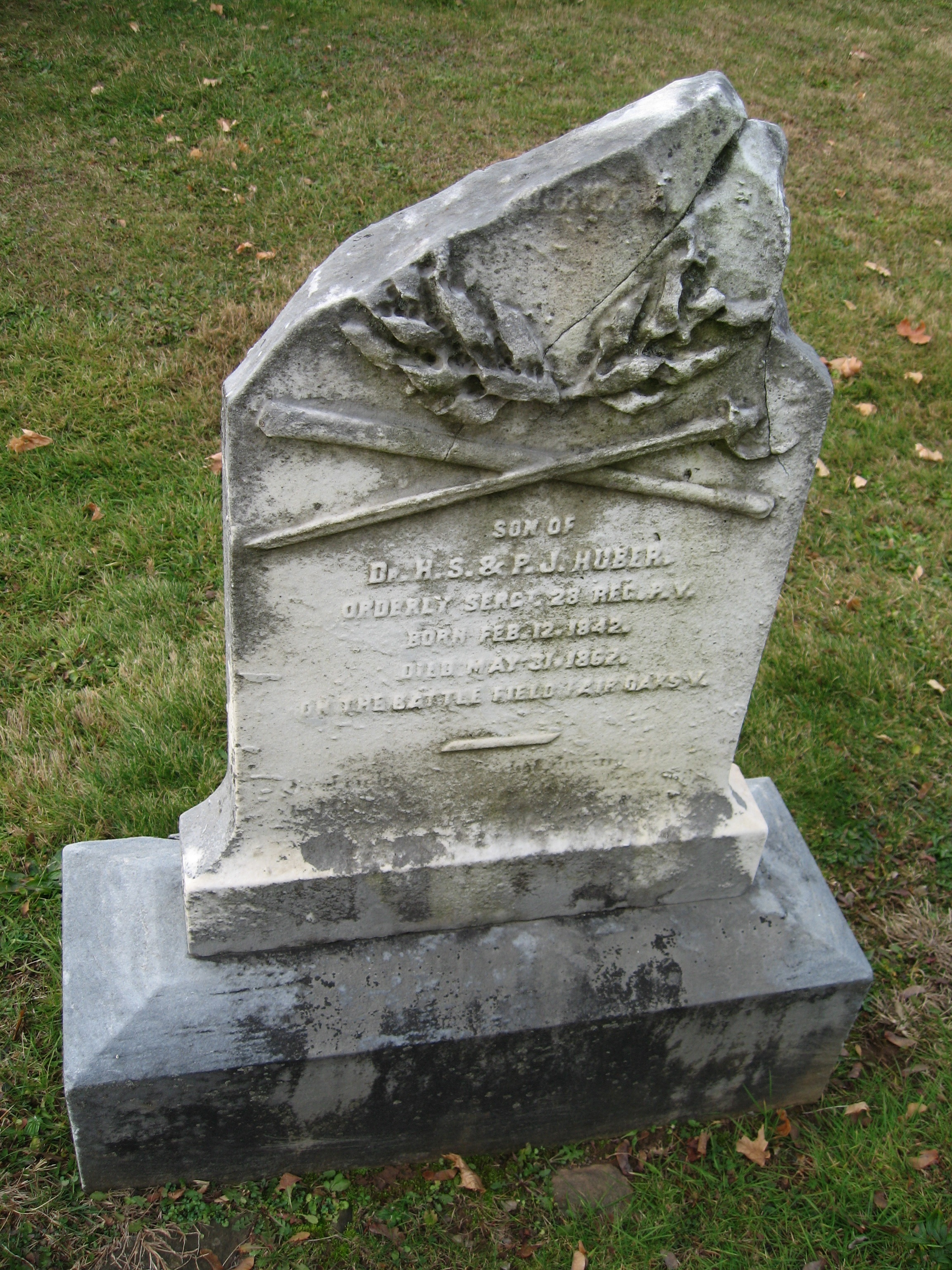
Frederick Huber's headstone shows battle damage.

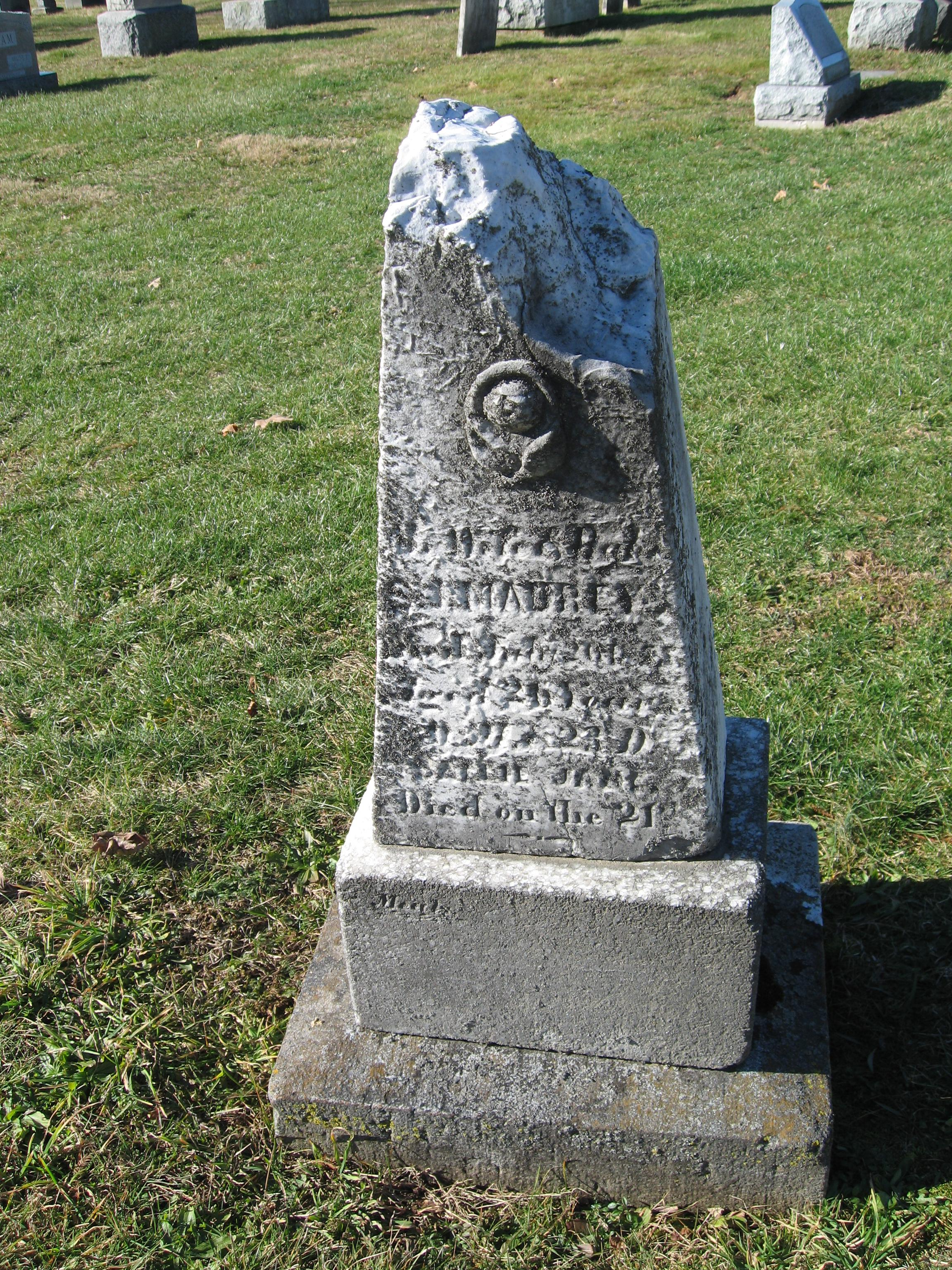
Maurey headstone shows battle damage.

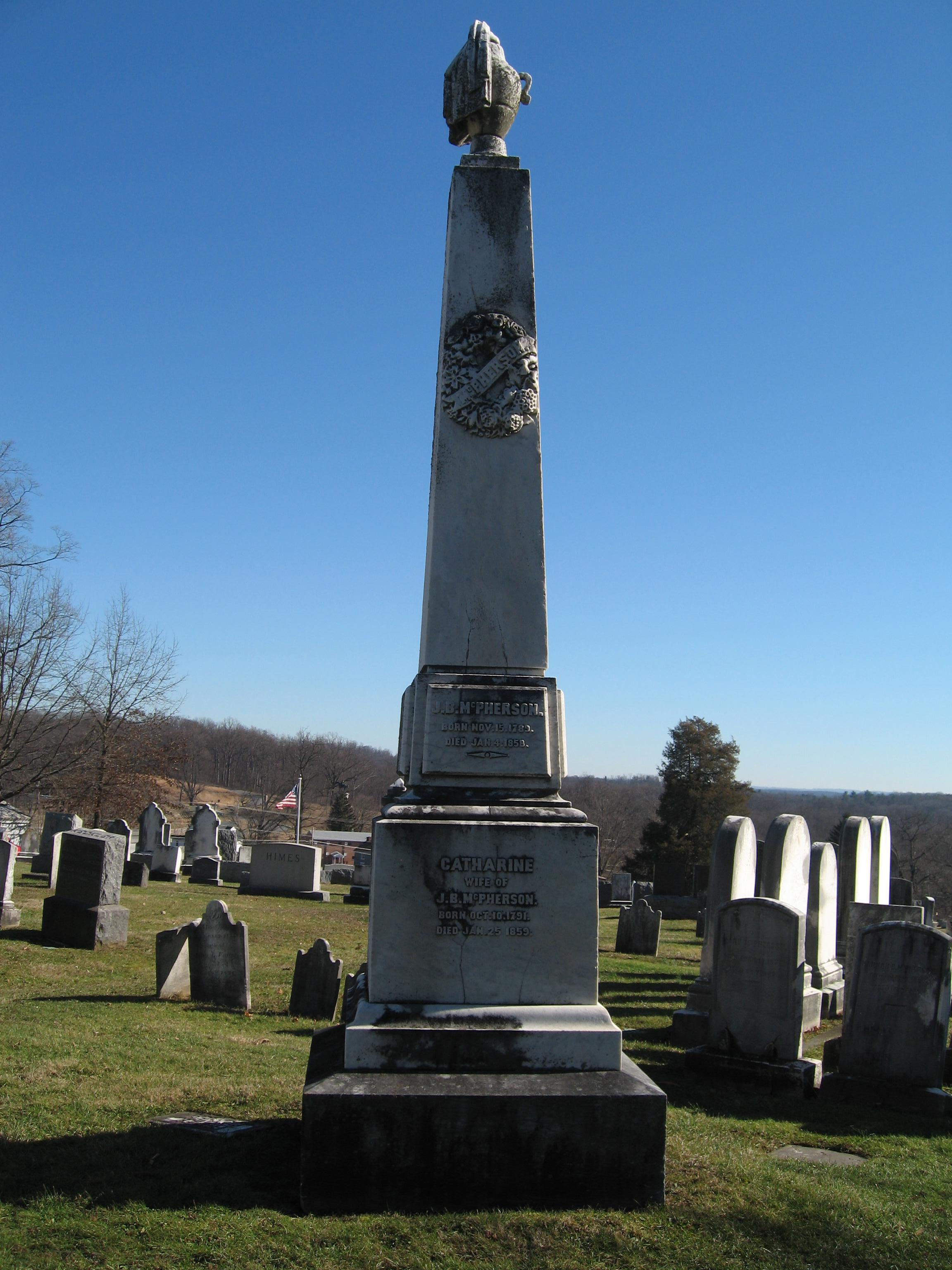
McPherson's obelisk was laid over by Union troops.

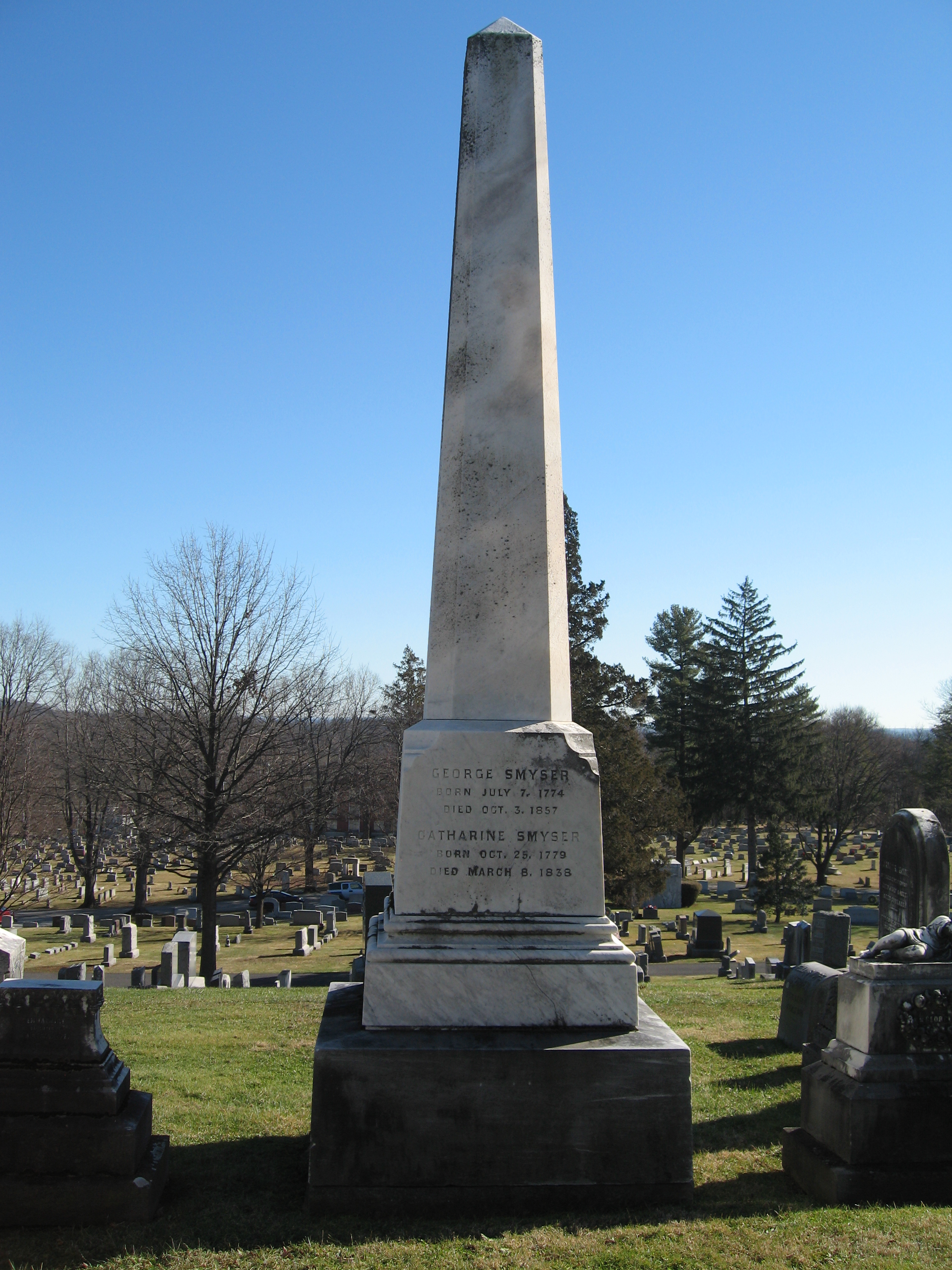
Smyser's obelisk was laid over by Union troops.

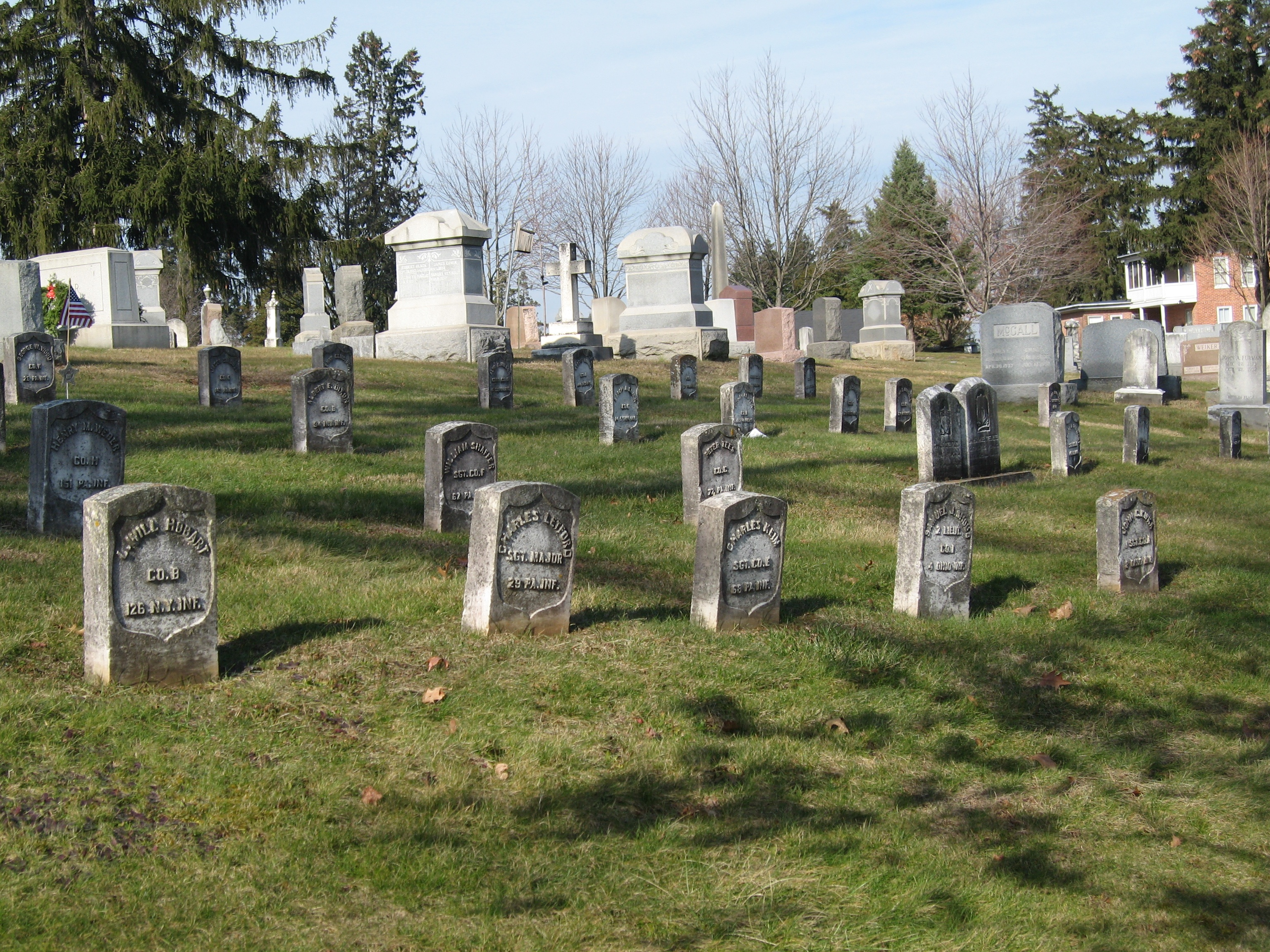
Some 69 Union battle casualties remain permanently.

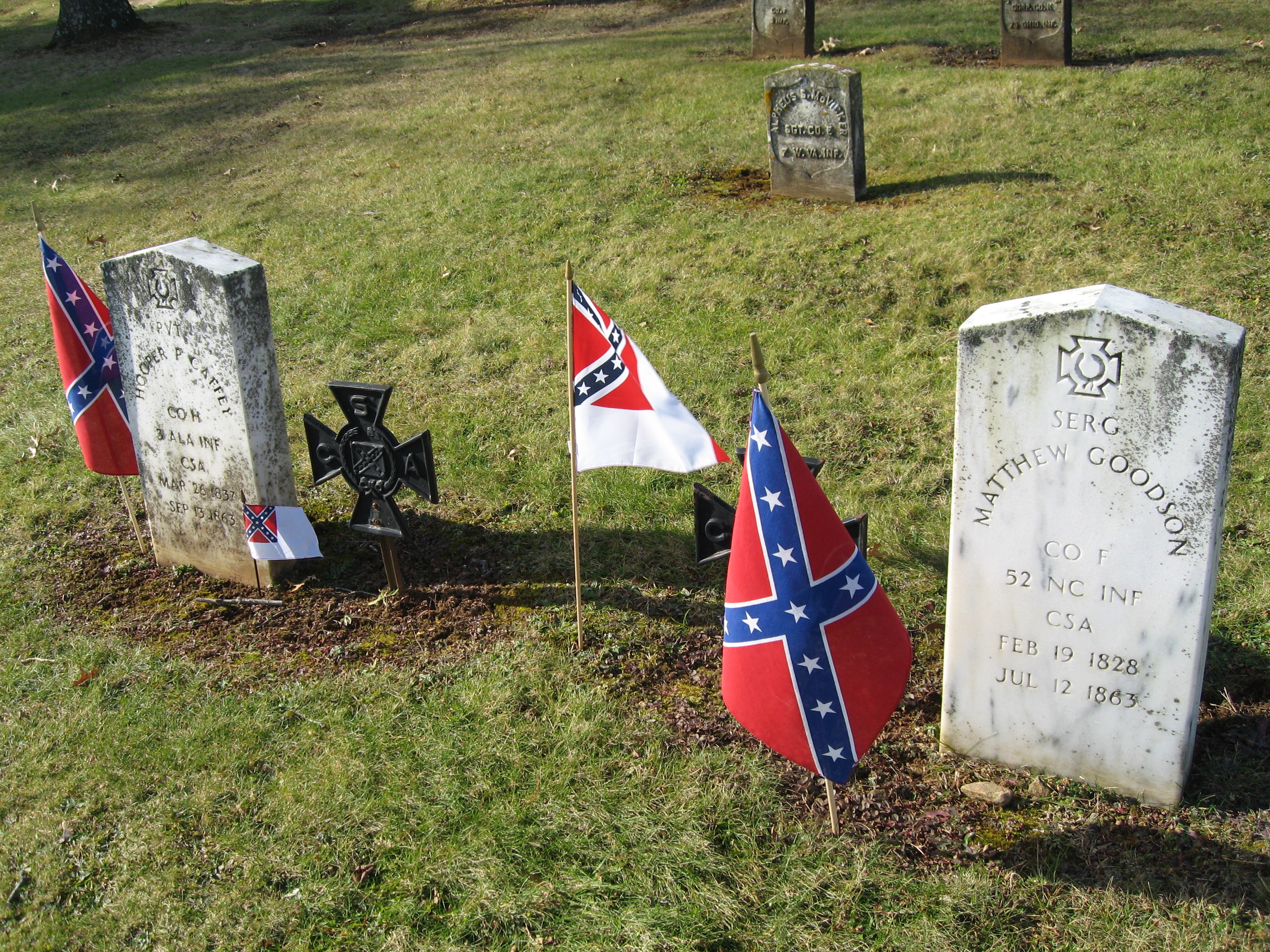
Confederate casualty cenotaphs. Due to local outrage, the remains were re-located to unmarked locations.

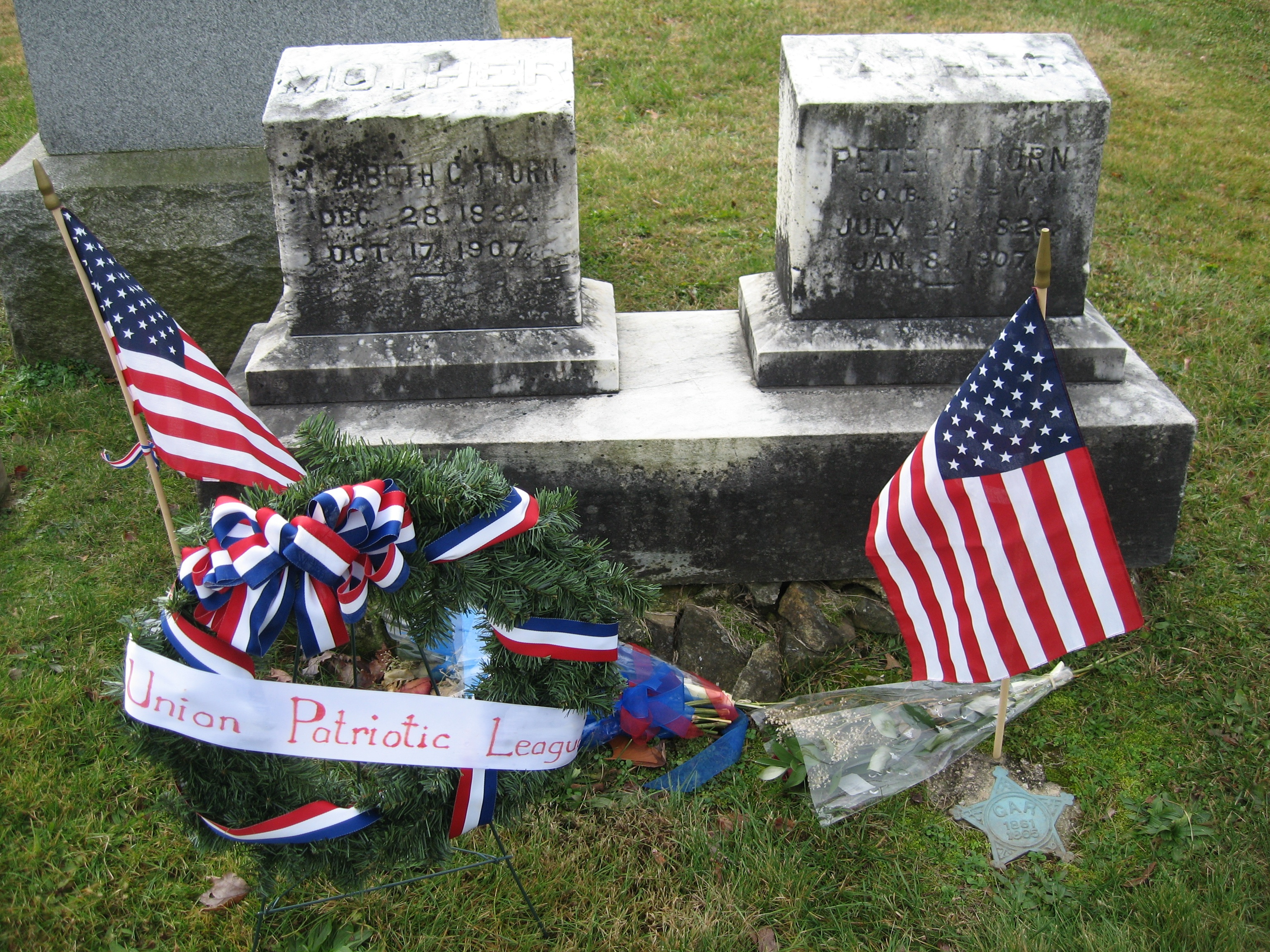
At six months pregnant, Elizabeth Thorn acted as caretaker in her husband's absence and buried more than 100 casualties. Peter Thorn served in the 138th PA Volunteers.

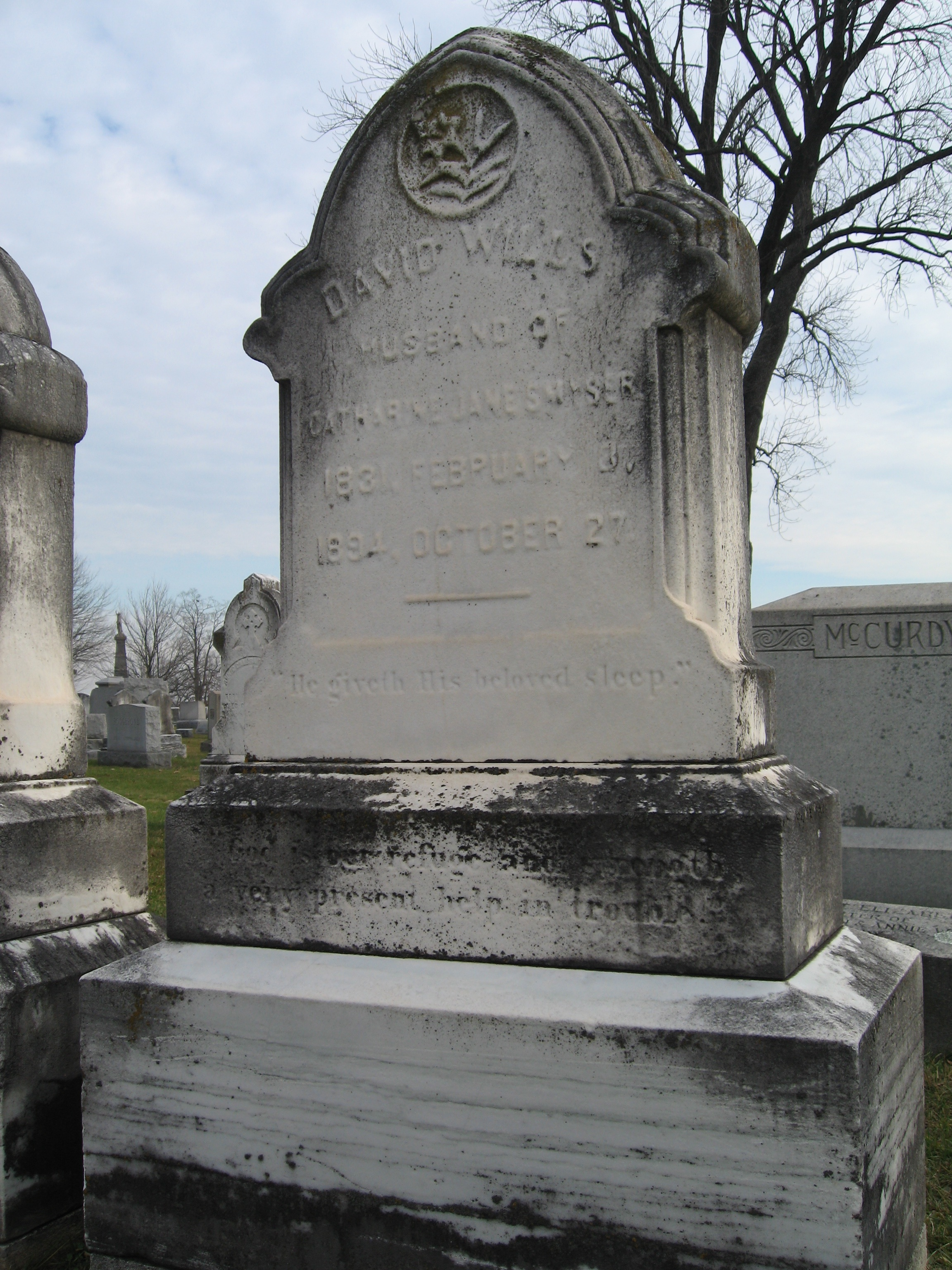
David Wills organized and executed the adjacent National Cemetery.

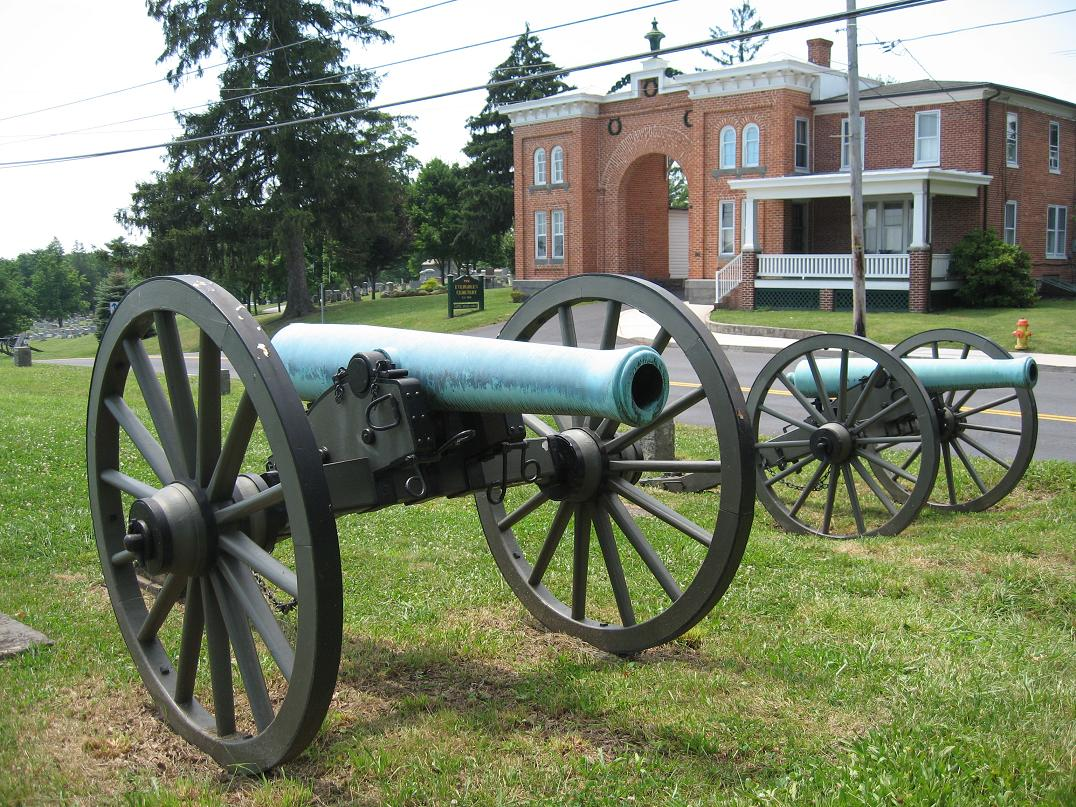
Stewart's Battery straddled the Baltimore Pike, just north of the Gatehouse.

== See also ==
- Category:Burials at Evergreen Cemetery (Adams County, Pennsylvania)
