= Elizabeth Thorn =

American cemetery caretaker (1832–1907)

- Born: Elizabeth Möser; December 28, 1832; Grand Duchy of Hesse
- Died: October 17, 1907 (aged 74); Pennsylvania, US
- Monuments: Gettysburg Women's Memorial
- Occupation: Cemetery caretaker
- Employer: Evergreen Cemetery
- Known for: Burying 100 fallen soldiers after the Battle of Gettysburg

Elizabeth Möser Thorn (December 28, 1832 – October 17, 1907) was an American cemetery caretaker who served as the caretaker of Evergreen Cemetery in Adams County, Pennsylvania, while her husband was serving in the Union Army. While pregnant, Thorn buried approximately one hundred soldiers who had died at the Battle of Gettysburg in 1863.

== Early life ==
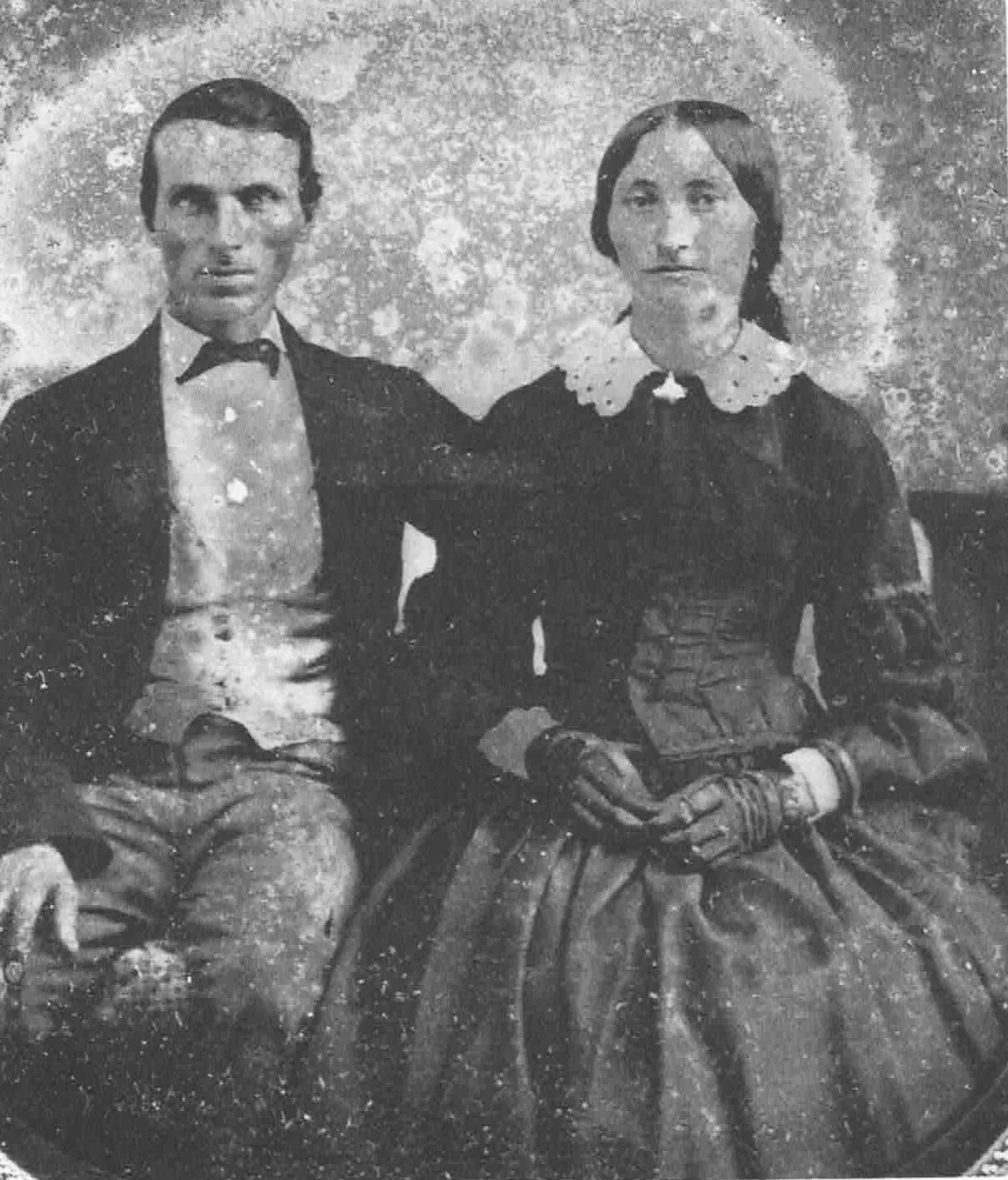
Peter and Elizabeth Thorn

Born in Hesse Darmstadt, Germany, in 1832, Elizabeth and her parents, John and Catherine Möser, immigrated to the United States in 1854. Little was known about her early life. After settling in Gettysburg, Pennsylvania, she married another German immigrant, Peter Thorn, in September 1855. Her husband became the first caretaker of Evergreen Cemetery in February 1856, earning $150 a year and living with his family in the gatehouse rent-free in exchange for digging graves and maintaining the grounds. He enlisted in the Union's 138th Pennsylvania Infantry Regiment on August 16, 1862, leaving his wife in charge of the cemetery. She had three young sons and was six months pregnant when war swept over Gettysburg on July 1–3, 1863.

== Battle of Gettysburg ==
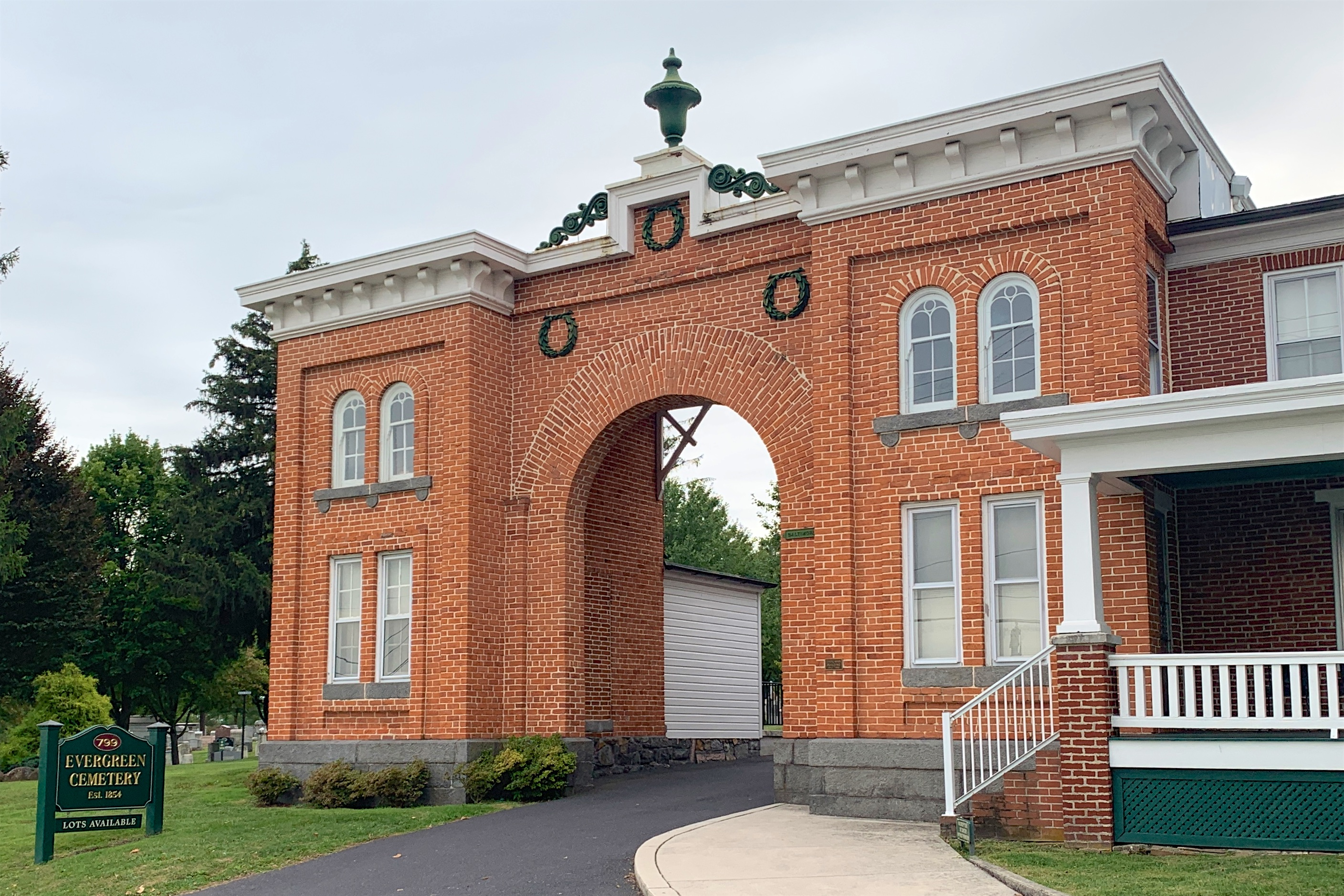
Evergreen Cemetery gatehouse, where the Thorns lived in 1863

Thorn was forced to feed hungry Confederate cavalry and later prepared dinner for Generals Oliver Otis Howard, Daniel Sickles and Henry Slocum. She also pointed out strategic roadways to a Union officer. Forced to flee as the battle approached her home, she returned on July 7 to find that General Howard had turned her home into his headquarters as well as into a field hospital thronging with wounded soldiers. The building had been heavily damaged, and goods worth $295 had been stolen or destroyed.

Although six months pregnant amid the summer heat, Thorn went to work tending the wounded and burying the dead. She and her elderly father buried forty bodies within two weeks of the battle and ultimately buried approximately one hundred fallen soldiers, long before the Gettysburg National Cemetery was dedicated on November 19, 1863. Estimates for the burials range from a low of 91 to around 100 to a high of 105. She earned no additional wages for this labor. In later years, Evergreen Cemetery president David McConaughy would deny knowledge of her heroic efforts.

On November 1, Thorn gave birth to a daughter who she named Rose Meade Thorn in honor of General George Meade, who commanded the Army of the Potomac at Gettysburg. Thorn's health declined, and her child, who had been sickly, died at the age of 14. Thorn remained cemetery caretaker until her husband returned safely from the war in 1865.

== Death and legacy ==
Peter Thorn resigned as caretaker in 1874 and died in January 1907 at age 82. Elizabeth died on October 17, 1907, at age 74. Both are buried in Evergreen Cemetery.

Not until late in life did Elizabeth Thorn begin to receive public recognition for her grave-digging contributions on the battlefield. Her recollections appeared in the Gettysburg Compiler (July 26, 1905) and The Gettysburg Times (July 2, 1938). Her papers are held by the Adams County Historical Society.

Thorn is the subject of the Gettysburg Women's Memorial, which stands fifty feet south of the cemetery gatehouse. The memorial features a bronze statue of a weary and heavily pregnant Thorn, leaning on a shovel and wiping her brow. Created by sculptor Ron Tunison, the memorial was dedicated in 2002.
