= Jack Byrne =

Jack Byrne may refer to:

- Jack Byrne (1920s footballer), Irish footballer
- Jack Byrne (politician) (1951–2008), Canadian politician
- Jack Byrne (footballer, born 1996), Irish footballer

== See also ==
- John Byrne (disambiguation)
- Jack Burns (disambiguation)
