= John Byrnes =

John Byrnes may refer to:

- John W. Byrnes (1913–1985, U.S. representative from Wisconsin
- John A. Byrnes (c. 1897–1963), American lawyer, politician, and judge from New York City

== See also ==
- John Burns (disambiguation)
- John Byrne (disambiguation)
