= Jack Burns (disambiguation) =

Jack Burns (1933–2020) was an American comedian and voice actor.

Jack Burns may also refer to:

- Jack Burns (American football coach) (born 1949), assistant coach for the Washington Redskins
- Jack Burns (Australian footballer) (1918–1995), Australian footballer for Collingwood
- Jack Burns (first baseman) (1907–1975), American first baseman, coach, and scout in Major League Baseball
- Jack Burns (golfer) (1859–1927), Scottish golfer
- Jack Burns (second baseman) (1880–1957), second baseman for the Detroit Tigers
- Jack Byrnes, a character in the 2000 film Meet the Parents

== See also ==
- John Burns (disambiguation)
- Jack Byrne (disambiguation)
