= John Burn =

John Burn may refer to:

- John Burn (bishop) (1851–1896), Anglican colonial bishop
- John Burn (rower) (1884–1958), English doctor and rower
- John Burn (geneticist) (born 1952), British geneticist and professor of clinical genetics
- John Southerden Burn (1798–1870), English solicitor and antiquary

== See also ==
- John Byrne (disambiguation)
- John Burns (disambiguation)
