= Gettysburg and Petersburg Turnpike =

Gettysburg and Petersburg Turnpike, in addition to the original turnpike road, may refer to:

- Baltimore Pike (Adams County, Pennsylvania), the designation for the remaining unnumbered portion of the Gettysburg and Petersburg Turnpike.
- Gettysburg and Petersburg Turnpike Company, the corporation that built and operated the turnpike.
- Pennsylvania Route 97 (Adams County), which is the southern portion of the former Gettysburg and Petersburg Turnpike.
- U.S. Route 140, a former US Highway designation—the northern portion of which had been the Gettysburg and Petersburg Turnpike.
