= John L. Burns =

American soldier and constable

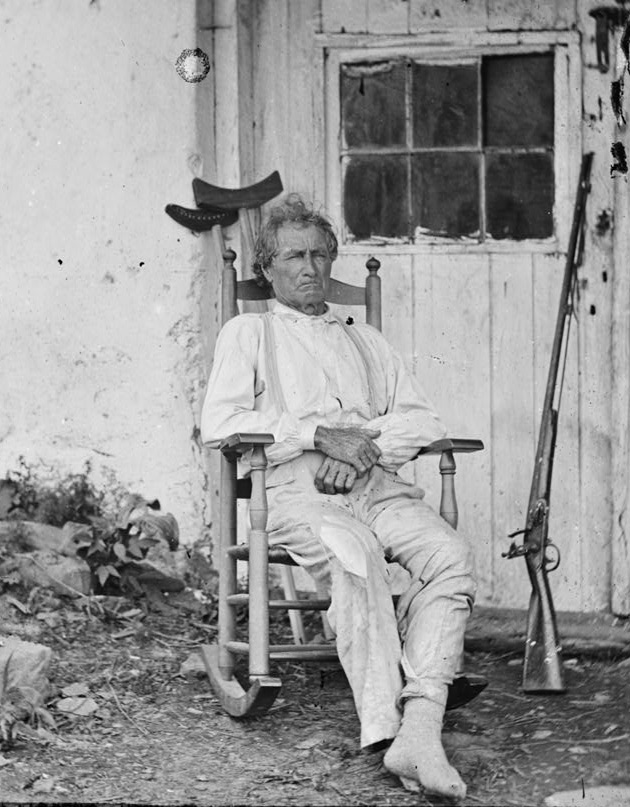
- Burns, photographed by Timothy H. O'Sullivan in 1863
- Born: John Lawrence Burns; September 5, 1793; Burlington, New Jersey, U.S.
- Died: February 4, 1872 (aged 78)
- Burial place: Evergreen Cemetery
- Military career
- Allegiance: United States of America
- Branch: United States Army
- Conflicts: War of 1812; Battle of Lundy's Lane; Mexican–American War; American Civil War; Battle of Gettysburg

John Lawrence Burns (September 5, 1793 – February 4, 1872) was an American soldier and constable. A veteran of the War of 1812, at age 69 he fought as a civilian combatant with the Union Army at the Battle of Gettysburg during the American Civil War. He was wounded, but survived to become a national celebrity.

== Life ==
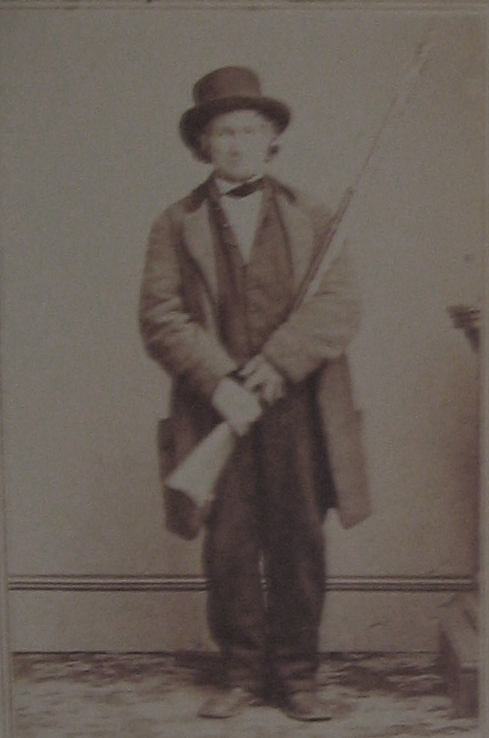
John L. Burns

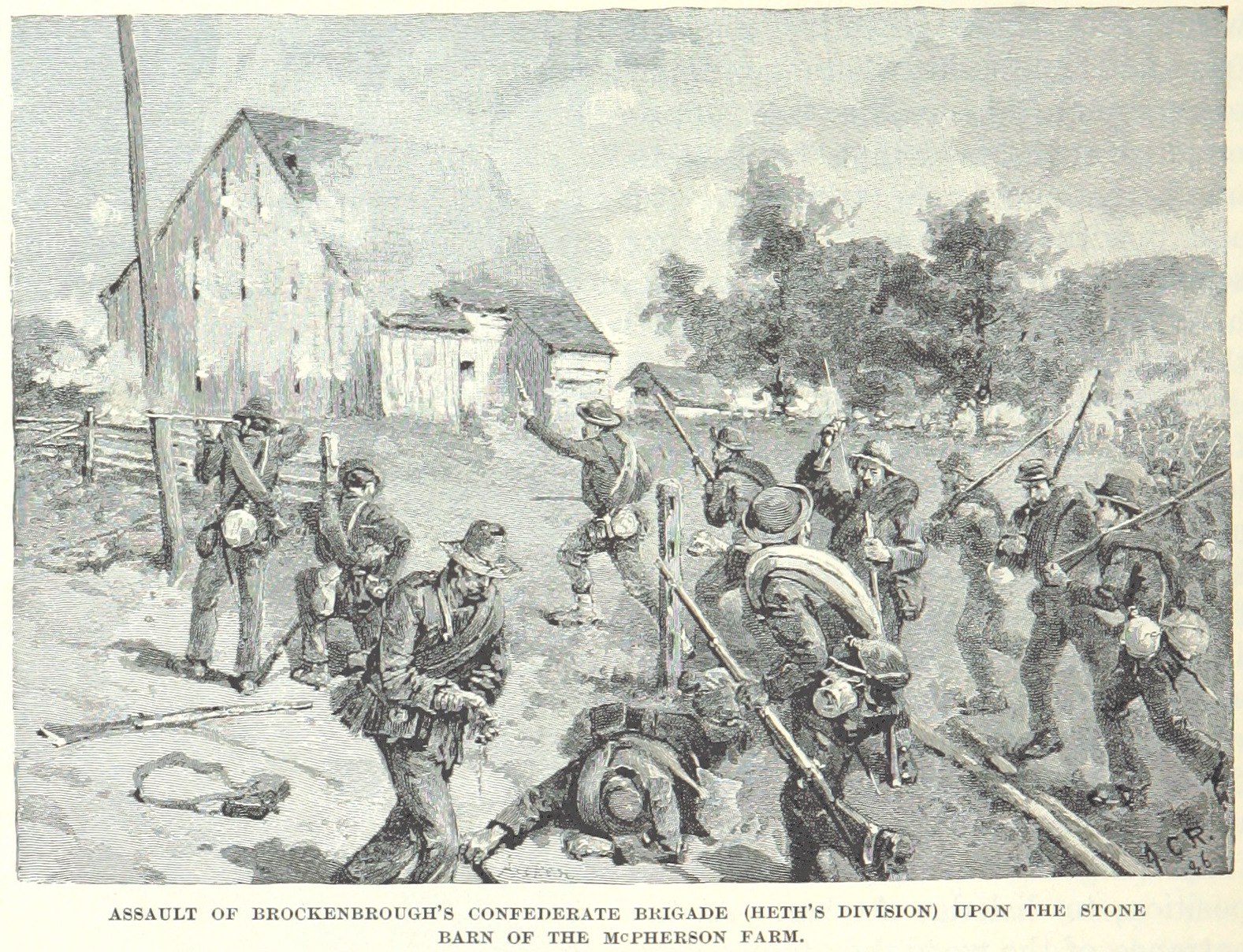
Confederates of Heth's Division attack the Stone barn at MacPherson's Farm.

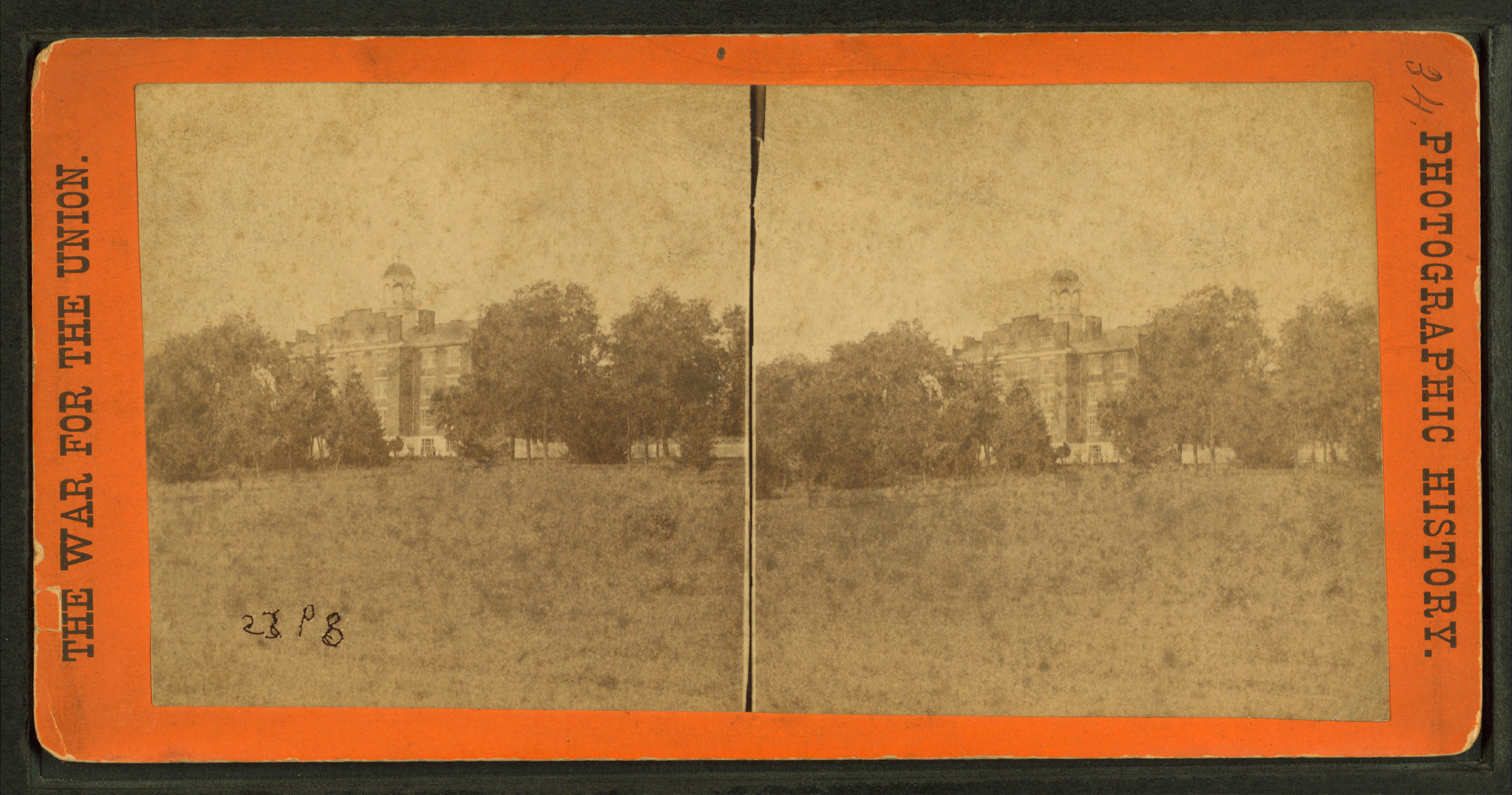
The "Seminary"

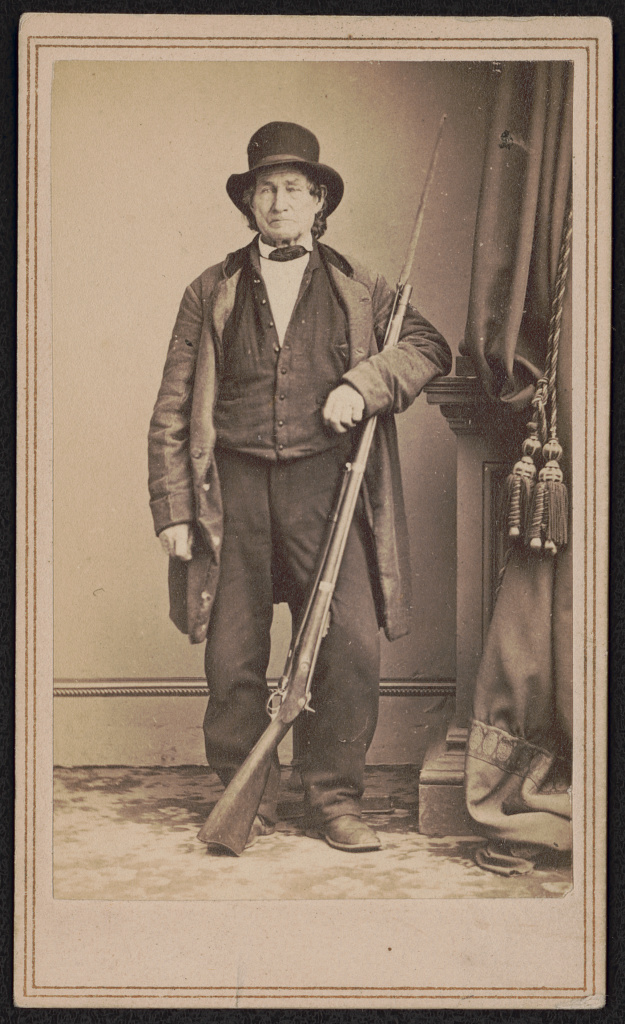
John L. Burns, veteran of the War of 1812, civilian who fought at the Battle of Gettysburg with Union troops, standing with bayoneted musket. Mathew Brady's National Photographic Portrait Galleries, photographer. From the Liljenquist Family Collection of Civil War Photographs, Prints and Photographs Division, Library of Congress

Burns was born in Burlington, New Jersey, of Scottish ancestry; his father claimed a relationship with poet Robert Burns. He served as an enlisted man in the War of 1812, fighting in numerous battles, including Lundy's Lane, and volunteered for both the Mexican–American War and the Civil War. He was rejected for combat duty in the latter war due to his advanced age, but he served as a teamster in support of the Union Army. He was sent home against his will to Gettysburg, Pennsylvania, where he was named constable. During Confederate Maj. Gen. Jubal A. Early's brief occupation of Gettysburg on June 26, 1863, Burns was jailed for his adamant assertion of civil authority in resisting. As the Confederates departed, Burns was released from jail and arrested some of the Confederate stragglers, continuing his opposition to the invading army until he was relieved by Federal cavalry under Brig. Gen. John Buford.

On the first day of the Battle of Gettysburg, July 1, 1863, Burns took up his flintlock musket and powder horn and walked out to the scene of the fighting that morning. He encountered a wounded Union soldier and asked if he could use his more modern rifle; the soldier agreed and Burns moved on with the rifle and with cartridges in his pocket, for he had declined an ammunition box, insisting the bullets were more easily accessible to him in his pocket than the box. Approaching Major Thomas Chamberlin of the 150th Pennsylvania Infantry, Burns requested that he be allowed to fall in with the regiment. Chamberlin later wrote of Burns moving with deliberate step, carrying his Enfield rifle at a trail.

His somewhat peculiar dress consisted of dark trousers and a waistcoat, a blue "swallow tail" coat with burnished brass buttons (as would have been seen on a well-to-do gentlemen four decades prior), and a high black silk hat, from which most of the original gloss had long departed, of a shape to be found only in the fashion plates of the remote past.

Despite his skepticism about the request, Chamberlin referred him to the regimental commander, Colonel Langhorne Wister, who sent the aged Burns into the woods next to the McPherson Farm, where he would find better shelter from the sun and enemy bullets.

In McPherson (Herbst) Woods, Burns fought with the 7th Wisconsin Infantry and then moved to join the 24th Michigan near the eastern end of the woods. He fought beside these men of the famous Iron Brigade throughout the afternoon, serving effectively as a sharpshooter, in one case shooting a charging Confederate officer from his horse. As the Union line began to give way and they fell back to the Seminary, Burns received wounds in the arm, the leg, and several minor ones in the breast; the Union soldiers were forced to leave him behind on the field. Injured and exhausted, the old man was able to crawl away from his rifle and to hastily bury his ammunition. He convinced the Confederates that he was a noncombatant, wandering the battlefield seeking aid for his invalid wife, and his wounds were dressed by their surgeons. This was a narrow escape for Burns, for by the rules of war he was subject to summary execution as a non-uniformed combatant, or bushwhacker. He was able to crawl that evening to the cellar of the nearest house, and was later conveyed to his own home, where he was treated by Dr. Charles Horner.

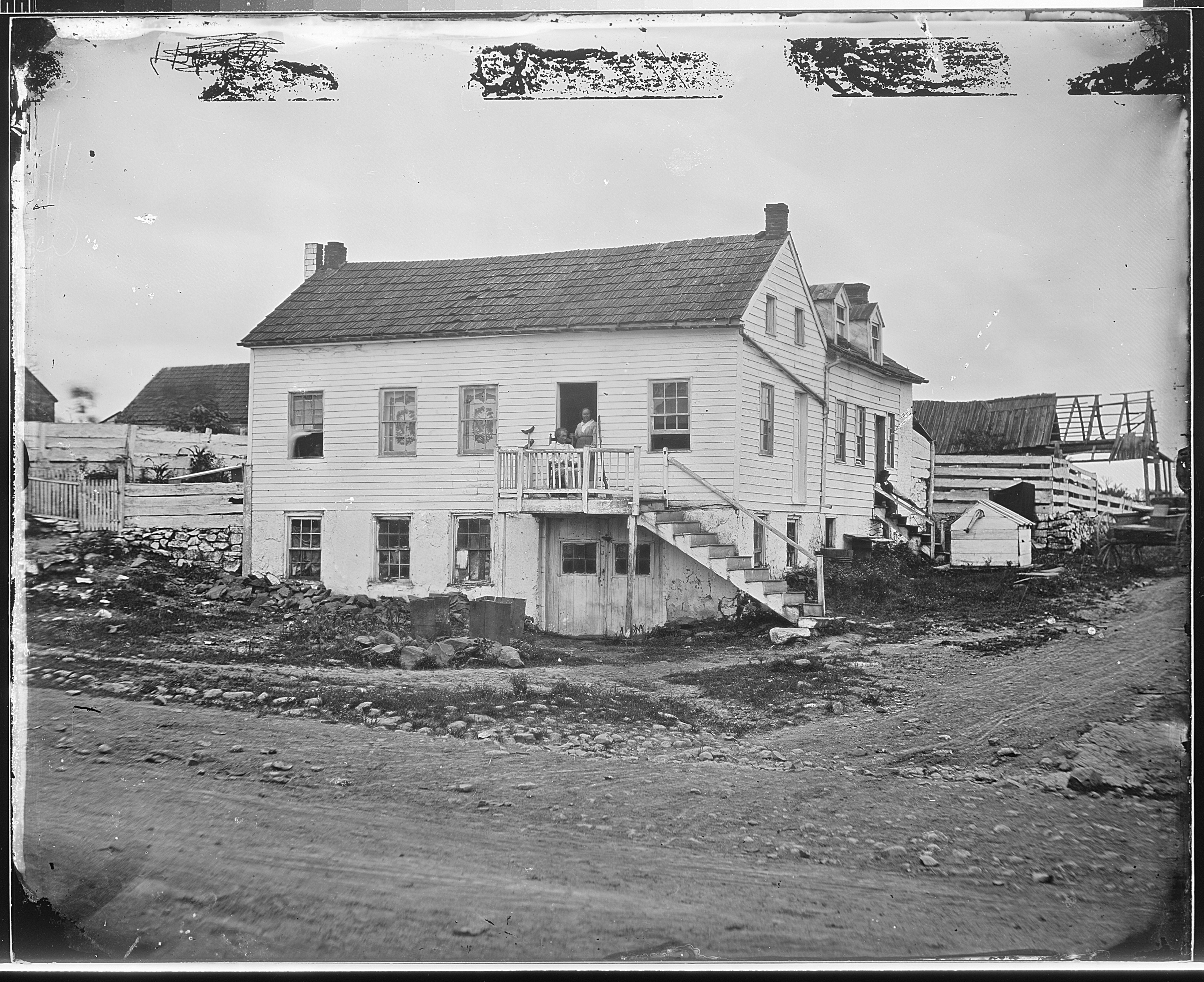
Burns's house shortly after the battle. Burns is seated at top of stairs

After the battle, Burns was elevated to the role of national hero. Hearing about the aged veteran, Mathew Brady's photographer Timothy H. O'Sullivan photographed Burns recuperating at his home on Chambersburg Street and took the story of Burns and his participation in the battle back home to Washington. When President Abraham Lincoln came to Gettysburg to dedicate the Soldiers National Cemetery and deliver his Gettysburg Address that fall, he requested to meet with Burns. Burns accompanied the president on a walk from the David Wills house to the Presbyterian Church on Baltimore Street on November 19, 1863. Burns's fame quickly spread and a poem about his exploits was published by Bret Harte in 1864.

According to Burns's biography in Appleton's Cyclopedia, during the last two years of his life his mind failed, and his friends were unable to prevent his wandering about the country. He was found in New York City on a cold winter's night in December 1871, in a state of destitution, and was cared for and sent home, but died of pneumonia in 1872.

== In memoriam ==
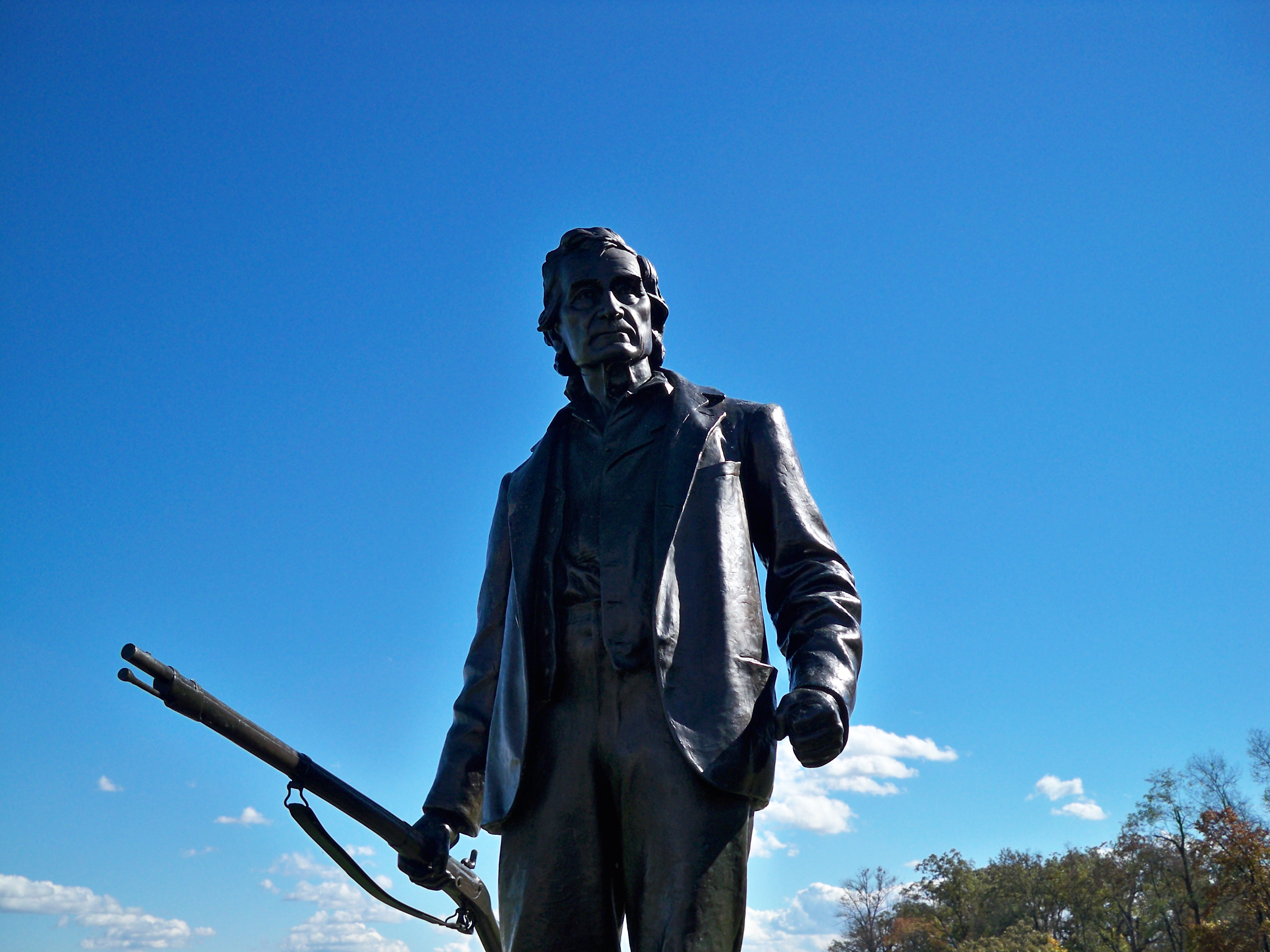
A statue of John Burns at Gettysburg National Military Park

The popularity of John Burns's participation in the battle grew in the post war years. His home on Chambersburg Street was razed after his death and veterans of the battle remarked that something should be done to commemorate his services. Reacting to a proposal by a Pennsylvania chapter of the Sons of Union Veterans, the state enacted legislation to provide funds for a fitting monument. The Pennsylvania Board of Commissioners on Gettysburg Monuments desired that the monument be placed on the field where Burns had fought with the 150th Pennsylvania and 7th Wisconsin regiments, and a site was chosen on McPherson's Ridge next to Herbst Woods. Sculptor Albert G. Bureau chose to depict a defiant Burns with clenched fist, carrying his borrowed rifle. Placed upon a boulder taken from the battlefield, the monument was dedicated on July 1, 1903, on the occasion of the 40th anniversary of the battle.

Burns is buried in Evergreen Cemetery in Gettysburg, one of only two graves there with permission to fly the American flag twenty-four hours per day (the other being the grave of Ginnie Wade, the only civilian killed during the battle). His original gravestone was vandalized, but replaced by the local chapter of the Grand Army of the Republic in 1902. It bears the inscription "Patriot".
