= John Burns (Scottish footballer) =

Scottish footballer

Personal information
- Full name: John Burns
- Place of birth: Scotland
- Position: Centre half

Senior career*
Years	Team	Apps	(Gls)
1911–1912	Dundee Hibernian	12	(0)
- * Club domestic league appearances and goals

John Burns was a Scottish professional footballer who played as a centre half. Brown signed for Dundee Hibernian in November 1911 and despite being a regular, left the club in April 1912 after playing a dozen league matches. It is unknown where he went after this.
