= John Byrne (footballer, born 1962) =

Irish soccer player

Personal information
- Full name: John Byrne
- Date of birth: 29 August 1962 (age 64)
- Place of birth: Dublin, Ireland
- Position: Midfielder

Senior career*
Years	Team	Apps	(Gls)
–1982	Home Farm		
1982–1990	Bohemians		
1990–1993	Sligo Rovers	107	(9)
1993–1995	St Patricks Athletic		
- * Club domestic league appearances and goals

John Byrne (born 29 August 1962) is an Irish former football player, who was active during the 1980s and 1990s.

== Career ==
Byrne played for Home Farm, Bohemians, Sligo Rovers and St Patricks Athletic during his career in the League of Ireland. He moved to Bohs from the 'Farm in 1982 and was top league scorer for Bohs during the 1986/87 season. His goalscoring record for that season showed a total of 9 goals in 22 league games. He moved to Sligo from Bohs when his contract ran out at the end of the 1989/90 season and spent 3 seasons there scoring 9 goals in 107 total appearances, 6 goals in 87 league appearances. He moved to St Pats from Sligo Rovers in 1993, signing for Brian Kerr under whom he won a league winners medal in 1995/96.

His son Seán followed in his footsteps and also played professional football. John works as a full-time sports lecturer in Technological University Dublin, a position he has held since 2002. He is a holder of the UEFA B License and currently coaches for Hartstown Huntstown based in Mulhuddart.
