= Battle of East Cemetery Hill =

American Civil War battle

American Civil War
- Part of Ewell's demonstration, Battle of Gettysburg
Date	July 2, 1863
Location	1932 Howard equestrian statue; Cumberland Township, Adams County, Pennsylvania 39.8219°N 77.228883°W
Result	Union Victory

Belligerents
Confederate	Union

Commanders and leaders
Richard S. Ewell	Oliver O. Howard

Units involved
Louisiana Tigers Brigade	

Casualties and losses
Heavy	
- Location within Pennsylvania

The battle of East Cemetery Hill during the American Civil War was a military engagement on the second day of the Battle of Gettysburg, in which an attack of the Confederacy's Louisiana Tigers Brigade and a brigade led by Colonel Robert Hoke was repelled by the forces of Colonel Andrew L. Harris and Colonel Leopold von Gilsa of the XI Corps (Union Army), plus reinforcements. The site is on Cemetery Hill's east-northeast slope, east of the summit of the Baltimore Pike.

Confederate General Robert E. Lee assigned Lt. Gen. Richard S. Ewell's Second Corps to launch a demonstration against the Union right to distract the Army of the Potomac during Longstreet's attack to the south-southwest (Hood's Assault, McLaws' Assault, and Anderson's assault). Ewell was to exploit any success his demonstration might achieve by following up with a full-scale attack at his discretion. Preceded by a 4 p.m. artillery barrage from Benner Hill, the demonstration's infantry attack commenced with Johnson's Assault on Culp's Hill. The Union artillery lunettes on East Cemetery Hill provided protection from the barrage, and the counterbattery fire on Ewell's 4 batteries forced them to withdraw with heavy casualties (e.g., Major Joseph W. Latimer).

The attack on East Cemetery Hill. Baltimore Pike: Artillery lunettes downhill and along the east of the pike were uphill of the Union infantry line at the Brickyard Lane stone wall. Northwest: Maj. Gen. Robert Rodes's division along the dirt path (now Long Lane) in the darkness was not ready to attack a different side of Cemetery Hill until the east battle was almost over. Confederate Union

== Engagement ==
After the Confederates attacked Culp's Hill at about 7 p.m. and as dusk fell around 7:30 p.m., Ewell sent two brigades from the division of Jubal A. Early against East Cemetery Hill from the east, and he alerted the division of Maj. Gen. Robert E. Rodes to prepare a follow-up assault against Cemetery Hill proper from the northwest. The two brigades from Early's division were commanded by Brig. Gen. Harry T. Hays: his own Louisiana Tigers Brigade and Hoke's Brigade, the latter commanded by Colonel Isaac E. Avery. They stepped off from a line parallel to Winebrenner's Run southeast of town. Hays commanded five Louisiana regiments, which together numbered only about 1,200 officers and men. Avery had three North Carolina regiments totaling 900.

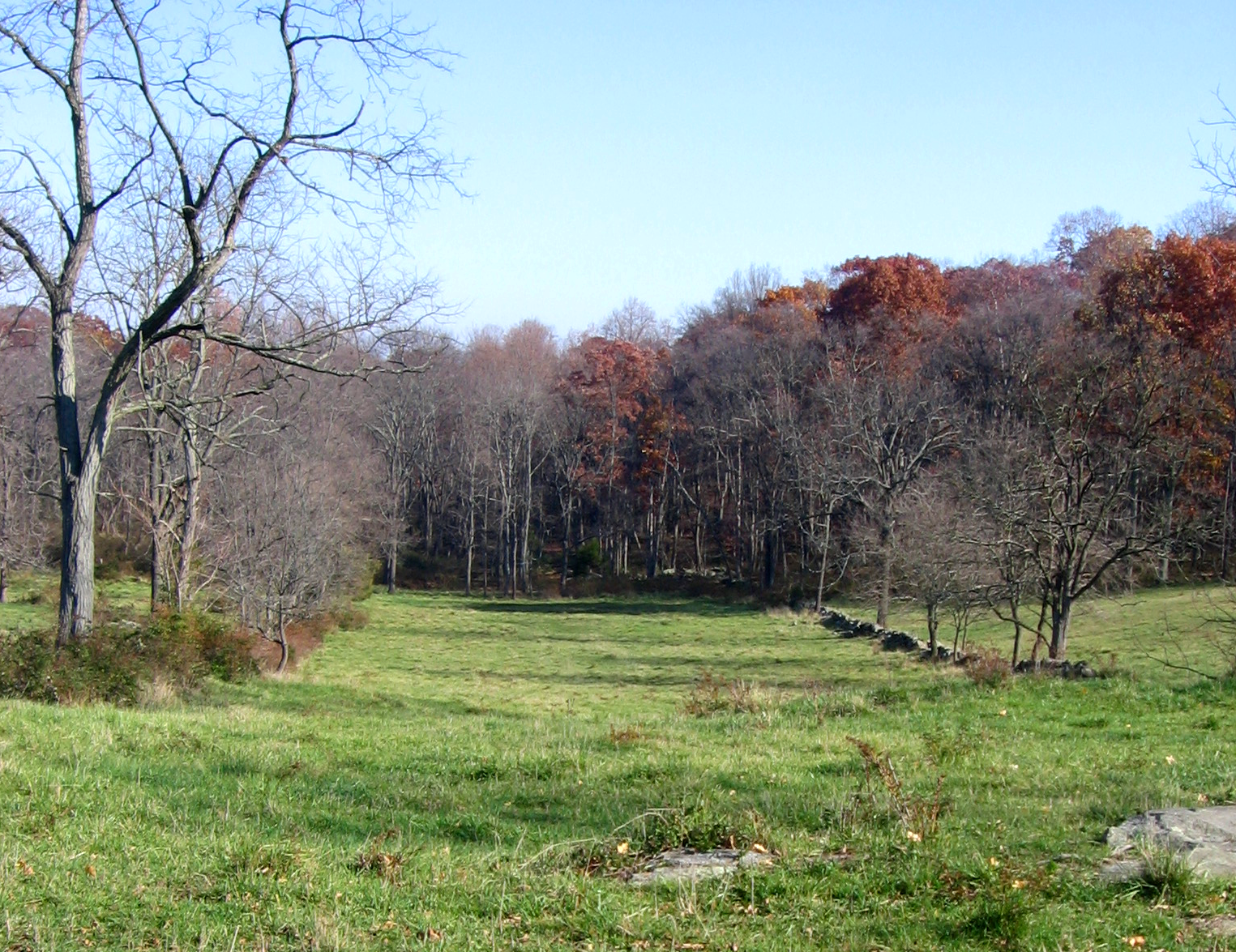
Winebrenner's Lane

The 2 Union brigades of 650 and 500 officers and men. Harris' brigade was at a low stone wall on the northern end of the hill and wrapped around the base of the hill onto Brickyard Lane (now Wainwright Av). Von Gilsa's brigade was scattered along the lane as well as on the hill. Two regiments, the 41st New York and the 33rd Massachusetts, were stationed in Culp's Meadow beyond Brickyard Lane in expectation of an attack by Johnson's division. More westerly on the hill were the divisions of Maj. Gens. Adolph von Steinwehr and Carl Schurz. Colonel Charles S. Wainwright, nominally of the I Corps, commanded the artillery batteries on the hill and on Steven's Knoll. The relatively steep slope of East Cemetery Hill made artillery fire difficult to direct against infantry because the gun barrels could not be depressed sufficiently, but they did their best with canister and double canister fire.

Attacking with a Rebel yell against the Ohio regiments and the 17th Connecticut in the center, Hays' forces bounded over a gap in the Union line at the stone wall. Through other weak spots some Confederates reached the batteries at the top of the hill and others fought in the darkness with the 4 remaining Union regiments on the line at the stone wall. On the crest of the hill against the gunners of Wiedrich's New York battery and Ricketts' Pennsylvania battery "with bayonet, clubbed musket, sword, pistol, and rocks from the wall,… 75 North Carolinians of the Sixth Regiment and 12 Louisianian's of Hays's brigade… cleared the heights and silenced the guns."

The 58th and 119th New York regiments of Krzyżanowski's brigade reinforced Wiedrich's battery from West Cemetery Hill, as did a II Corps brigade under Col. Samuel S. Carroll from Cemetery Ridge arriving in the dark double-quick over the hill's south slope through Evergreen Cemetery as the Confederate attack was starting to ebb. Carroll's men secured Ricketts's battery and swept the North Carolinians down the hill to sweep the Louisiana attackers down the hill until they reached the base and "flopped down" for Wiedrich's guns to fire canister at the retreating Confederates.

Brig. Gen. Dodson Ramseur, the leading brigade commander, saw the futility of a night assault against artillery-backed Union troops in 2 lines behind stone walls. Ewell had ordered Brig. Gen. James H. Lane, in command of Pender's division, to attack if a "favorable opportunity presented", but when notified Ewell's attack was starting and Ewell was requesting cooperation in the unfavorable attack. Losses on both sides were severe; e.g., Confederate Col. Avery: "…tell my father I died with my face to the enemy."
