= John A. Burns (American football) =

American football coach

Biographical details
- Born: November 7, 1916
- Died: March 30, 1968 (aged 51)

Coaching career (HC unless noted)
- 1951–1952: Apprentice
- 1962: Apprentice

Head coaching record
- Overall: 5–20

John A. Burns (November 7, 1916 – March 30, 1968) was an American football coach. He was the 13th and then later the 18th head football coach at The Apprentice School in Newport News, Virginia. He and he held that position for three seasons, from 1951 to 1952 and again in 1962. His coaching record at Apprentice was 5–20.
