= John Byrne (footballer, born 1949) =

English footballer

Personal information
- Full name: John Joseph Anthony Byrne
- Date of birth: 24 March 1949 (age 77)
- Place of birth: Wallasey, England
- Position: Winger

Senior career*
Years	Team	Apps	(Gls)
1968–1969	Tranmere Rovers	1	(0)
- * Club domestic league appearances and goals

John Joseph Anthony Byrne (born 24 March 1949) is an English footballer, who played as a winger in the Football League for Tranmere Rovers.
