= David Wills (Gettysburg) =

American lawyer

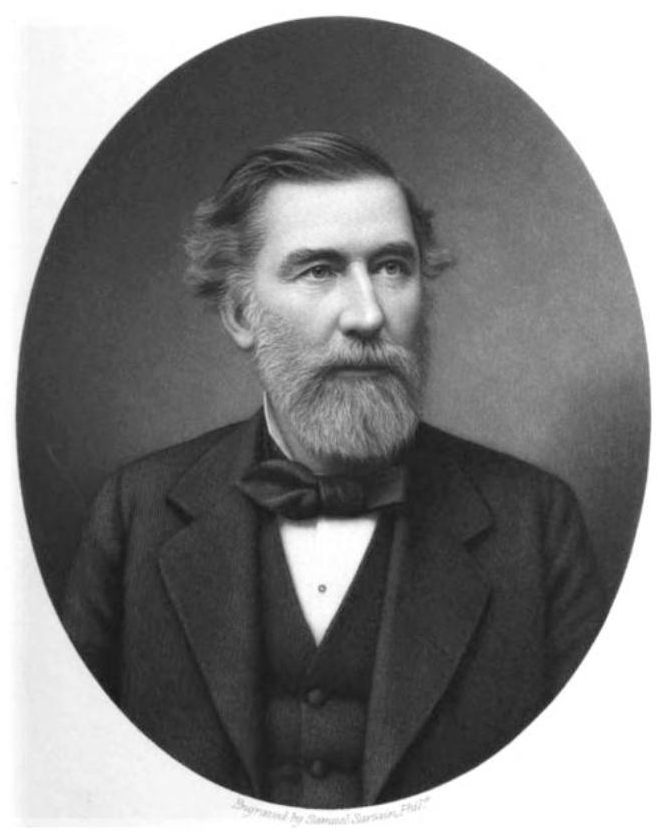
- David Wills was the instigator of the Gettysburg National Cemetery and Lincoln's dedicatory address given there
- Born: February 3, 1831; Menallen Township, Adams County, Pennsylvania
- Died: October 27, 1894 (aged 63); Gettysburg, Pennsylvania
- Education: Gettysburg College
- Occupation: Lawyer

Signature
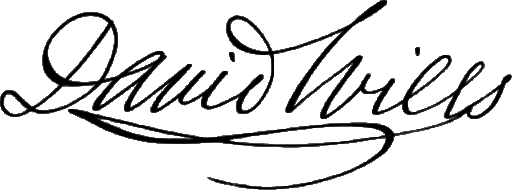

David Wills (February 3, 1831 – October 27, 1894) was the principal figure in the establishment of the National Cemetery at Gettysburg, Pennsylvania. As a result of his efforts, the Gettysburg Address was given by Abraham Lincoln. Wills was Lincoln's host while in Gettysburg, and the Gettysburg Address was completed in the large upstairs bedroom occupied by the President during his brief stay in the town.

== Biography ==
David Wills was born in Menallen Township, Adams County, Pennsylvania, the son of James Wills, a farmer. He remained on his father's farm until 13 years of age, entering Pennsylvania College (now Gettysburg College) in 1846 from which he graduated with high honors in 1851. He then became a principal of the Academy at Cahaba, Alabama, where he taught one year. In 1853 he entered as a law student in the office of Hon. Thaddeus Stevens at Lancaster and in 1854 he was admitted to the Bar of Pennsylvania.

He opened a law office in Gettysburg in 1853. He was elected Burgess of the Borough of Gettysburg. He was elected the first County Superintendent of Schools of Adams County, and on him devolved the organization of the new school system. He was also elected director of the Bank of Gettysburg in 1854 and served until 1860 when he was succeeded by his father, James Wills, who served until 1867.

He was a trustee of Wilson College, Chambersburg. He was also a trustee of the Dickinson School of Law, Carlisle. He was for more than twenty years a trustee of Pennsylvania College. In 1874 he was appointed President Judge of the 42nd Judicial District composed of Adams and Fulton Counties.

The American Civil War came to the doorstep of the Wills home July 1–3, 1863. During the Confederate occupation of the town, Wills saw "a group of rebels with an ax break open the store door" of one of his tenants. As the battle raged around the town, local citizens huddled in his cellar.

The House of David Wills in Gettysburg is where Abraham Lincoln put the finishing touches on the Gettysburg Address he had composed in Washington, D.C.

Mr. Wills suggested the idea of the Soldiers' National Cemetery at Gettysburg to Governor Andrew Gregg Curtin immediately after the Battle of Gettysburg. He was appointed the agent of the Commonwealth of Pennsylvania by Governor Curtin to organize the Soldiers' National Cemetery and looked after its interest. However, rival lawyer David McConaughy had already started purchasing land on Cemetery Hill with the intention of preserving it for the Federal government instead of the commonwealth.

Notably, it was in Wills' house on November 18 that President Lincoln wrote the final draft of the Gettysburg Address. The David Wills House, now operated as a historic house museum, renovated and reopened to the public in February 2009.

== Family ==
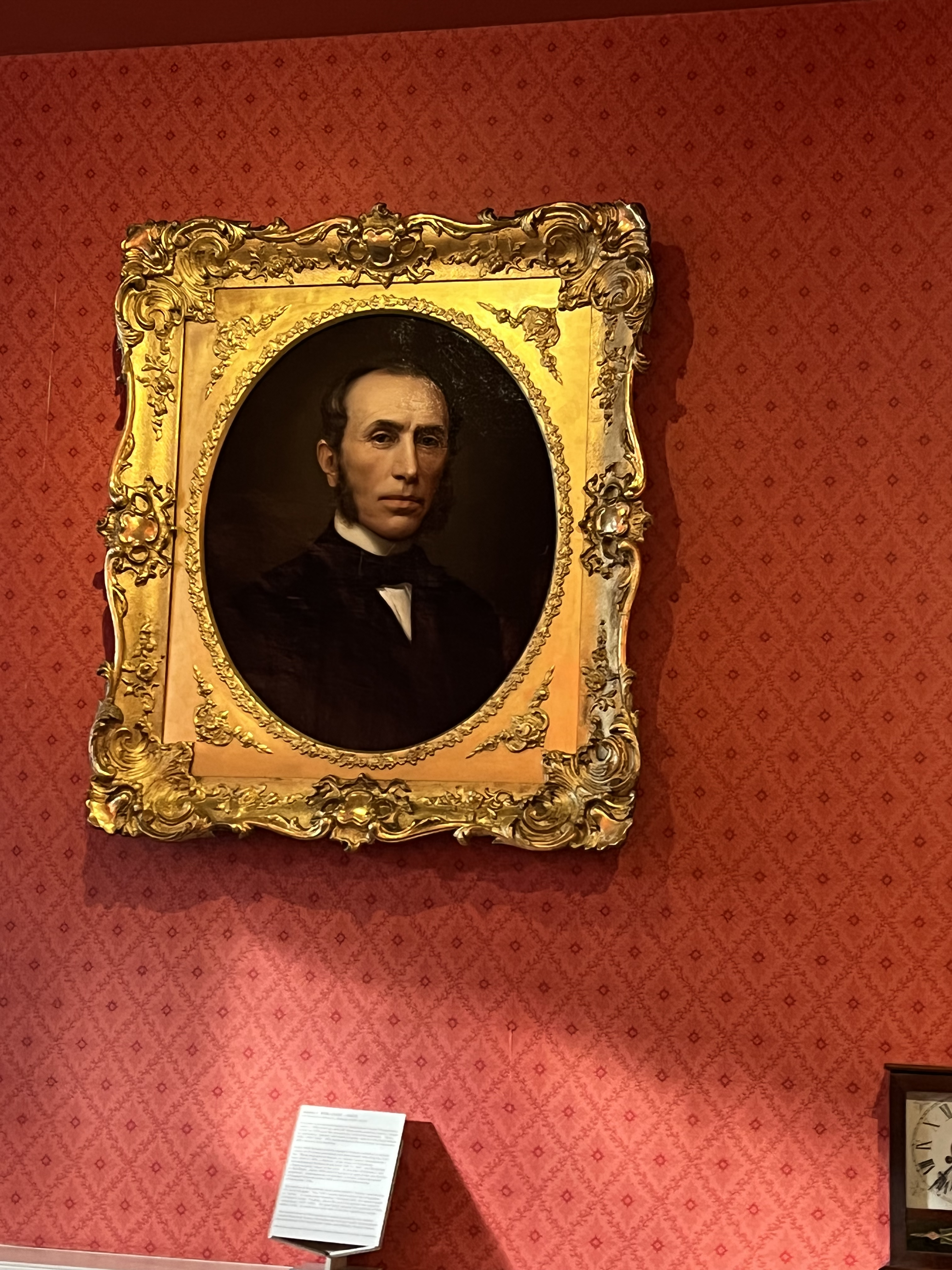
Portrait of Wills

In 1856, he married Catherine Jane "Jennie" Smyser and by the summer of 1863, the Wills had three children. In all, they had seven children: Catherine, Mary, Annie, Jennie, Emma, David Jr., and James.

David Wills died at his home in Gettysburg on October 27, 1894.
