= Louisiana Guard Battery =

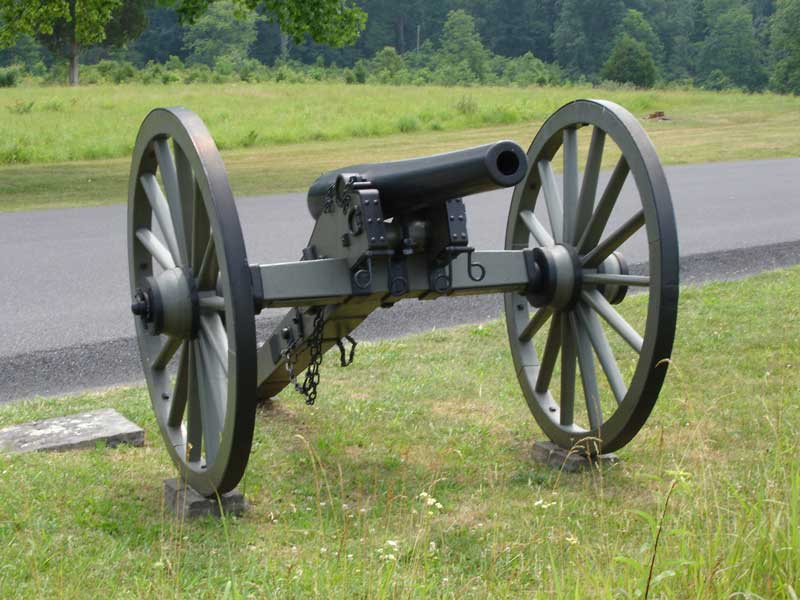
- At Antietam, the battery was armed with two captured Federal-made 3-inch Ordnance rifles, as shown.
- Active: 21 July 1861 – 9 April 1865
- Country: Confederate States of America
- Allegiance: Confederate States of America; Louisiana
- Branch: Confederate States Army
- Type: Artillery
- Size: Company
- Equipment: 2 x 3-inch Ordnance rifles, 1 x 10-pounder Parrott rifle (Sept. 1862)
- Engagements: American Civil War; Battle of Cedar Mountain (1862); Second Battle of Bull Run (1862); Battle of Antietam (1862); Battle of Fredericksburg (1862); Battle of Chancellorsville (1863); Second Battle of Winchester (1863); Battle of Gettysburg (1863); Second Battle of Rappahannock Station (1863); Siege of Petersburg (1864–65); Battle of Appomattox (1865)

Commanders
- Notable commanders: Louis D'Aquin †; Charles Thompson †; Charles A. Green

The Louisiana Guard Battery was an artillery unit recruited from volunteers in Louisiana that fought in the Confederate States Army during the American Civil War. Formed from an infantry company sent to fight in the Eastern Theater of the American Civil War, it was converted to an artillery company in July 1861. The battery fought at Cedar Mountain, Second Bull Run, Antietam, and Fredericksburg in 1862, and at Chancellorsville, Second Winchester, and Gettysburg in 1863. Most of the soldiers and all of the battery's guns were captured at Rappahannock Station on 7 November 1863. The surviving gunners manned heavy artillery pieces in the defenses of Richmond, Virginia, and the battery's remnant surrendered at Appomattox.

== Formation ==
The Louisiana Guard Battery began its existence on 28 April 1861 in New Orleans as Company B of the 1st Louisiana Infantry Regiment led by Captain Camille E. Girardey. Before it became part of the regiment, the company was named the Louisiana Guards, Company B. The regiment first traveled to Richmond, then Norfolk, Virginia, then Weldon, North Carolina, where it stayed until May 1862. During the Seven Days Battles, the regiment fought at Oak Grove on 25 June and Malvern Hill on 1 July, sustaining 214 casualties. On 5 July 1862, B Company was detached for artillery service. On 21 July, the unit was reconstituted as an independent battery. Girardey resigned in July and was replaced as captain by Louis D'Aquin.

== Service ==
=== 1862 ===
At first, the Louisiana Guard Battery was assigned to garrison duty in southeast Virginia and northeast North Carolina. On 9 August 1862, it fought in its first action as a battery in the Battle of Cedar Mountain. On 28–30 August, the battery fought at the Battle of Second Bull Run as part of the artillery battalion in Major General Richard S. Ewell's division, Major General Thomas J. Jackson's Left Wing, General Robert E. Lee's Army of Northern Virginia. Among Jackson's gunners, only Major L. M. Shumaker's battalion of Brigadier General William E. Starke's division was posted in a good artillery position. Jackson's other batteries were limited in effectiveness because of the woods along the front of the Confederate defenses.

In September 1862, D'Aquin's Louisiana Guard Battery was armed with one 10-pounder Parrott rifle and two 3-inch Ordnance rifles. At the Battle of Antietam on 17 September 1862, the battery was attached to Brigadier General Harry T. Hays' Louisiana brigade in Brigadier General John R. Jones' division. At Antietam, the battery lost 1 killed and 8 wounded. Major John Pelham posted four batteries, later joined by D'Aquin's battery, in the left rear of Jones' division. This was an excellent artillery position because Pelham's guns dominated the terrain in front of the Confederate left flank. D'Aquin's battery was posted on the extreme left of the other batteries. Union Brigadier General Henry Jackson Hunt's 20-pounder Parrott rifles raked the position at long range, causing casualties.

At the Battle of Fredericksburg on 13 December, the Louisiana Guard Battery took position with the cavalry on the extreme right flank. D'Aquin was killed, 1 man was wounded, and 1 gun was dismounted. Charles Thompson replaced D'Aquin as captain commanding the battery. At Fredericksburg, the battery was part of Captain Joseph W. Latimer's artillery battalion in Brigadier General Jubal Early's division, Jackson's Second Corps, Army of Northern Virginia. Latimer's six batteries lost 4 killed and 21 wounded.

=== 1863 ===
At the Battle of Chancellorsville on 1–3 May 1863, Thompson's Louisiana Guard Battery was assigned to Lieutenant Colonel Hilary P. Jones' artillery battalion in Brigadier General Raleigh Colston's division, Jackson's Second Corps. Two brigades from Colston's division were part of the second line in Jackson's flank attack of 2 May. Since there were few clearings in the forest, most of the artillery could not be deployed. The guns were ordered to help crush Union resistance as the assault moved forward. On 3 May, the Confederates captured Hazel Grove and quickly deployed 28 guns at that location, but these did not include Thompson's battery. There were 14 guns firing from the Plank Road that may have included Thompson's battery, but the account does not say.

At the Second Battle of Winchester on 15 June 1863, Ewell's Second Corps trapped a Union division led by Brigadier General Robert H. Milroy and inflicted 4,443 casualties, including 3,358 captured. The Confederates lost only 269, which included the Louisiana Guard Battery's Thompson mortally wounded. He was replaced as captain by Charles A. Green. At the Battle of Gettysburg on 1–3 July 1863, Green's Louisiana Guard Battery took 60 men into action and sustained 7 casualties. It was part of Jones' artillery brigade in Early's division, Ewell's Second Corps. On 1 July, the battery lost 1 man killed. On 2–3 July, the battery was temporarily attached to Brigadier General Wade Hampton's cavalry brigade and took losses of 1 killed and 5 wounded. In the cavalry fight on 3 July, the Confederates had 14 guns versus 10 Union guns. However, the Union artillerymen cooperated more effectively than the Confederate gunners.

The Bristoe campaign lasted from 9 October to 9 November 1863. When Lee found that the Union Army of the Potomac sent two corps to the Western Theater of the American Civil War, he briefly went on the offensive. However, the Union army was able to pull back into an unassailable position. The first week of November found Lee's army on the south bank of the Rappahannock River with Hays' Louisiana brigade of Early's division holding a fortified bridgehead on the north bank. When Federal artillery began shelling the bridgehead, Early sent some reinforcements. Lee consulted with Early, and both decided that the bridgehead was sufficiently strong. However, at 5 pm on 7 November, Brigadier General David Allen Russell's Union division overran the bridgehead and seized the pontoon bridge before the defenders could escape. Together with a smaller fiasco at Kelly's Ford, the Second Battle of Rappahannock Station cost the Confederates 2,023 casualties, against a Federal loss of 419. The Louisiana Guard Battery lost 4 guns and 41 officers and men captured.

=== 1864–1865 ===
The battery's survivors were ordered to Richmond to serve as crews of siege guns in the city's defenses. The Siege of Petersburg (June 1864 – April 1865) included Federal operations against both Richmond and Petersburg. Some soldiers from the battery were mounted as cavalry during the last phase of the war. At the Appomattox surrender on 9 April 1865, Green's Louisiana Battery was assigned to Lieutenant Colonel Alexander W. Stark's battalion, Brigadier General Armistead Lindsay Long's artillery brigade, Lieutenant General John B. Gordon's Second Corps, Lee's Army of Northern Virginia.

== See also ==
- List of Louisiana Confederate Civil War units
- Louisiana in the Civil War
