= Humiston =

Humiston is a surname. Notable people with the surname include:

- Amos Humiston (1830–1863), American soldier
- Mary Grace Quackenbos Humiston (1869–1948), first female Special Assistant United States Attorney
- Mike Humiston (born 1959), American football linebacker
