= Dunkelman =

Dunkelman may refer to:

== Persons with the surname Dunkelman ==
- Barbara Dunkelman (b. 1989), a Canadian voice actress and internet personality
- Ben Dunkelman (1913–1997), a Canadian Jewish officer who served in the Canadian Army in World War II
- Loretta Dunkelman (born 1934), American artist
- Mark H. Dunkelman (b. 1947), a historian, artist and musician in Providence, Rhode Island

== Objects ==
- 19694 Dunkelman, an asteroid
