= Cemetery Hill =

Landform on the Gettysburg Battlefield

Coordinates: 39°49′08″N 77°13′49″W

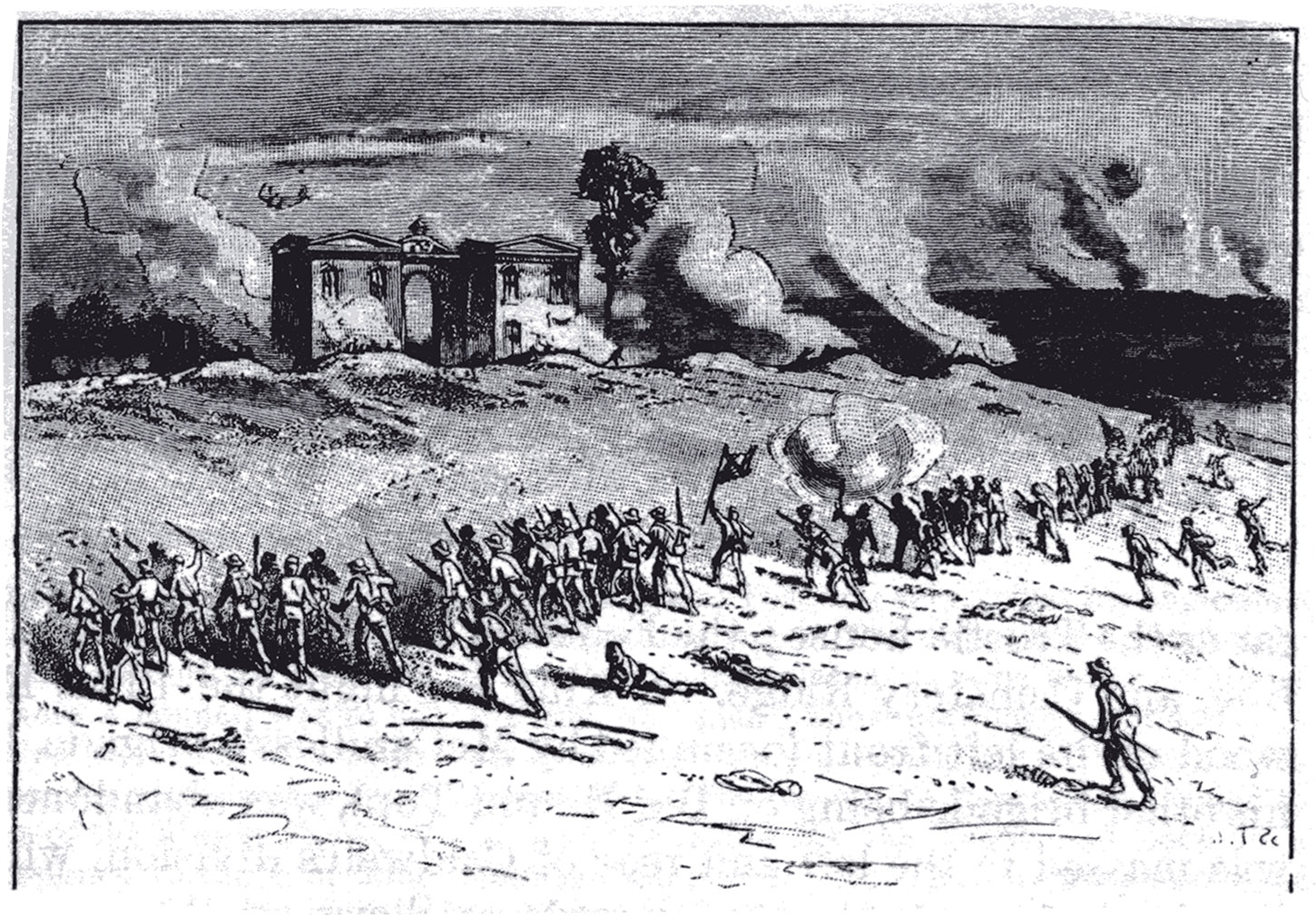
Jubal Early's attack on East Cemetery Hill, July 2, 1863 (engraving from The Century Magazine).

Cemetery Hill is a landform on the Gettysburg Battlefield that was the scene of fighting each day of the Battle of Gettysburg (July 1–3, 1863). The northernmost part of the Army of the Potomac defensive "fish-hook" line, the hill is gently sloped and provided a site for American Civil War artillery (cf. the heavily wooded, adjacent Culp's Hill).

== Plan ==
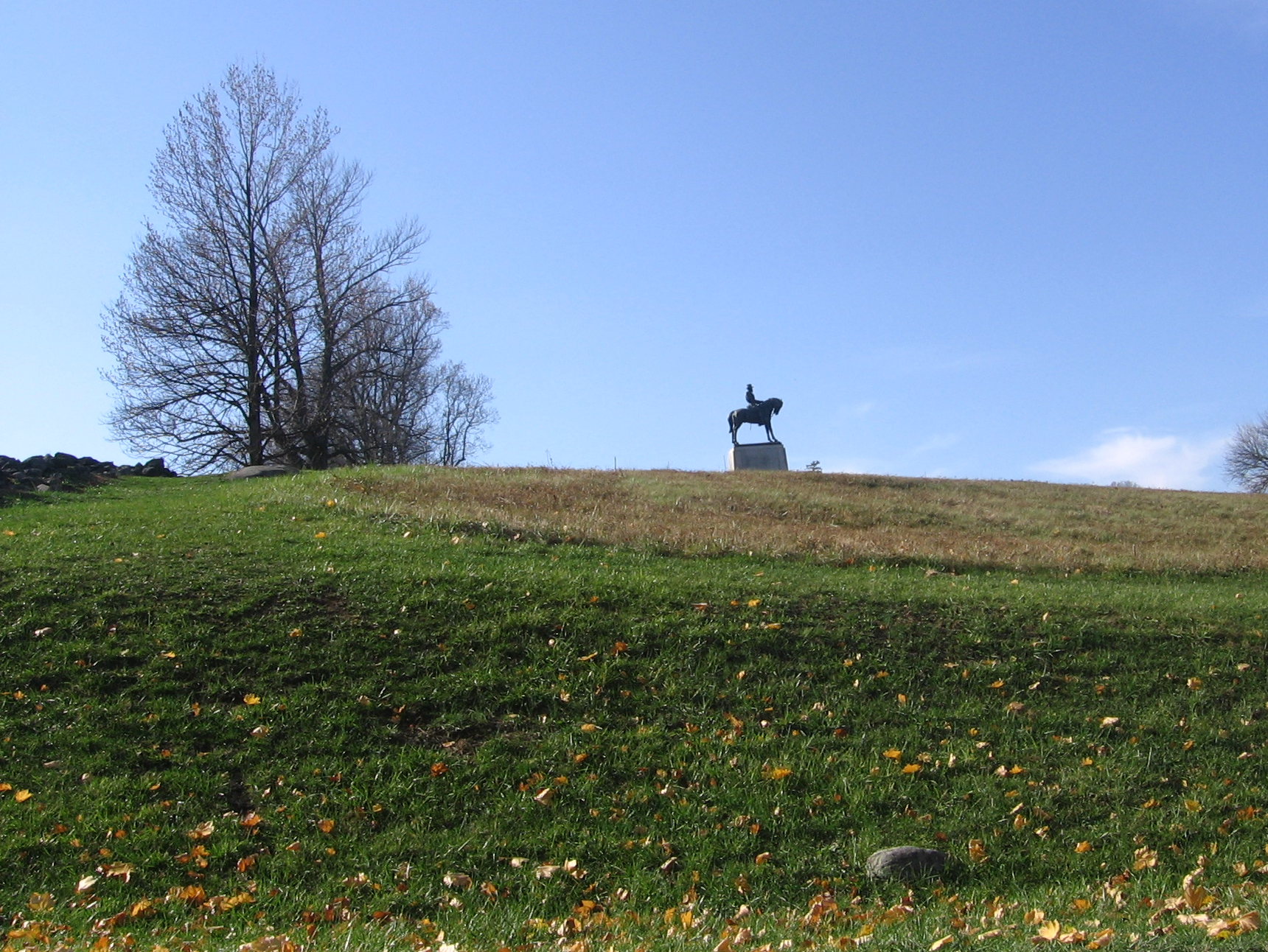
Cemetery Hill, with a statue of General Oliver Otis Howard at the top.

Cemetery Hill overlooks the main downtown area of Gettysburg from the south, at 503 feet (153 m) above sea level, 80 feet (24 m) above the town center, about 100 feet (30 m) above Winebrenner's Run at its base. Its crest extends in a southwest–northeast direction for about 700 yards (640 m). A shallow saddle on the crest about 150 yards (140 m) from its northeast slope is the point where the Baltimore Pike crosses the hill and separates East Cemetery Hill from the remainder. The slopes to the north and west rise gradually; on East Cemetery Hill, the rise is steeper. The hill is crossed by the Baltimore Pike and the Emmitsburg Road, with the Taneytown Road between them.

== History ==
The 1858 south boundary for the Gettysburg borough extended southeast from the Emmitsburg Road to the Cemetery Hill summit on the Taneytown Rd, then northeast across the Baltimore Pike summit to the hill's base, then northward to Winebrenner Run. On the south slope of Cemetery Hill (originally named Raffensperger's Hill, after farmer Peter Raffensperger, who owned over 6 acres (24,000 m^{2}) on the eastern slope) is the 1854 Evergreen Cemetery and its 1855 gatehouse used as a headquarters during the battle.

On June 26, 1863, prior to the Battle of Gettysburg, Lt. Col. Elijah V. White's Confederate cavalry occupied the hill and captured several horses hidden by local citizens, then departed to York County, Pennsylvania. The Gettysburg Railroad Station telegraph was subsequently moved to Cemetery Hill. The hill remained essentially free of military forces until the arrival of the Army of the Potomac.

=== Battle of Gettysburg, First Day ===
On July 1, 1863, Maj. Gen. Oliver O. Howard left infantry and artillery to hold the hill in case the army needed to fall back from its positions north and west of Gettysburg. Cemetery Hill became the rallying point for retreating Union troops of the I Corps and XI Corps (from fighting north and northwest of town). One of the great controversies of the battle was the failure of Lt. Gen. Richard S. Ewell, and his subordinate, Brig. Gen. William "Extra Billy" Smith, to attack and capture Cemetery Hill. Smith thought Union troops were approaching from the east, which caused Early to delay his attack on the hill to defend against the supposed threat. There proved to be no significant Union troop movements from the east, and Smith was the only brigadier general not commended by Early after the battle.

=== Battle of Gettysburg, Second Day ===
Early's attack on East Cemetery Hill Confederate Union

On July 2, Confederate General Robert E. Lee ordered attacks on both ends of the Union line. Lt. Gen. James Longstreet attacked with his First Corps on the Union left (Little Round Top, Devil's Den, Wheatfield). Lt. Gen. Richard S. Ewell and the Second Corps were assigned the mission of launching a simultaneous demonstration against the Union right, a minor attack that was intended to distract and pin down the Union defenders against Longstreet. Ewell was to exploit any success his demonstration might achieve by following up with a full-scale attack at his discretion.

Ewell began his demonstration at 4 p.m. upon hearing the sound of Longstreet's guns to the south. For three hours, he chose to limit his demonstration to an artillery barrage from Benner's Hill, about a mile (1,600 m) to the northeast. Although the Union defenders on Cemetery Hill received some damage from this fire, they returned counterbattery fire with a vengeance. Cemetery Hill is over 50 feet (15 m) taller than Benner's Hill, and the geometry of artillery science meant that the Union gunners had a decided advantage. Ewell's four batteries were forced to withdraw with heavy losses, and his best artillerist, 19-year-old Joseph W. Latimer, the "Boy Major", was mortally wounded.

Around 7 p.m., as the Confederate assaults on the Union left and center were petering out, Ewell chose to begin his main infantry assault. He sent three brigades from the division of Maj. Gen. Edward "Allegheny" Johnson across Rock Creek and up the eastern slope of Culp's Hill against a line of breastworks manned by the XII Corps brigade of Brig. Gen. George S. Greene. Greene's men held off the Confederate attack for hours, although the attackers were able to establish a foothold in some abandoned Union rifle pits. The fighting on Culp's Hill would resume the following day.

Not long after the assault on Culp's Hill began, as dusk fell around 7:30 p.m., Ewell sent two brigades from the division of Maj. Gen. Jubal A. Early against East Cemetery Hill from the east, and he alerted the division of Maj. Gen. Robert E. Rodes to prepare a follow-up assault against Cemetery Hill proper from the northwest. The two brigades from Early's division were commanded by Brig. Gen. Harry T. Hays: his own Louisiana Tigers Brigade and Hoke's Brigade, the latter commanded by Col. Isaac E. Avery. They stepped off from a line parallel to Winebrenner's Run, a narrow tributary of Rock Creek to the southeast of town. Hays commanded five Louisiana regiments, which together numbered only about 1,200 officers and men. Avery had three North Carolina regiments totaling 900. The brigade of Brig. Gen. John B. Gordon was in support behind Hays and Avery but did not participate in the fighting.

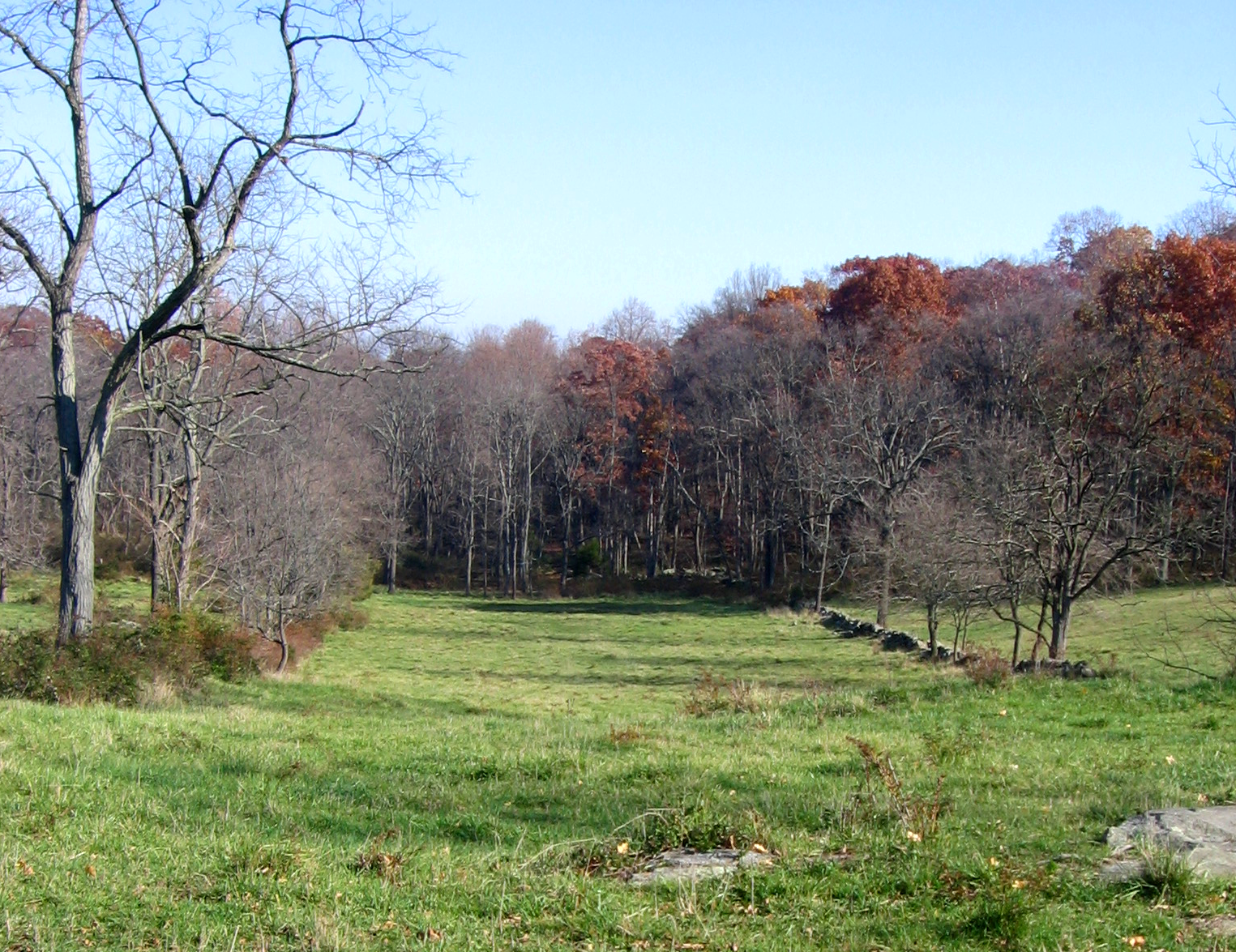
Winebrenner's Lane

Defending East Cemetery Hill were the two brigades (Cols. Andrew L. Harris and Leopold von Gilsa) of Brig. Gen. Francis C. Barlow's division (now commanded by Brig. Gen. Adelbert Ames) of the XI Corps. Both had seen heavy action on July 1 and they consisted of, respectively, 650 and 500 officers and men. Harris's men were stationed at a low stone wall on the northern end of the hill and wrapped around onto Brickyard Lane at the base of the hill. (Brickyard Lane was also known at the time as Winebrenner's Lane and today is named Wainwright Avenue.) Von Gilsa's brigade was scattered along the lane as well as on the hill. Two regiments, the 41st New York and the 33rd Massachusetts, were stationed in Culp's Meadow beyond Brickyard Lane in expectation of an attack by Johnson's division. More westerly on the hill were the divisions of Maj. Gens. Adolph von Steinwehr and Carl Schurz. Col. Charles S. Wainwright, nominally of the I Corps, commanded the artillery batteries on the hill and on Stevens Knoll. The relatively steep slope of East Cemetery Hill made artillery fire difficult to direct against infantry because the gun barrels could not be depressed sufficiently, but they did their best with canister and double canister fire.

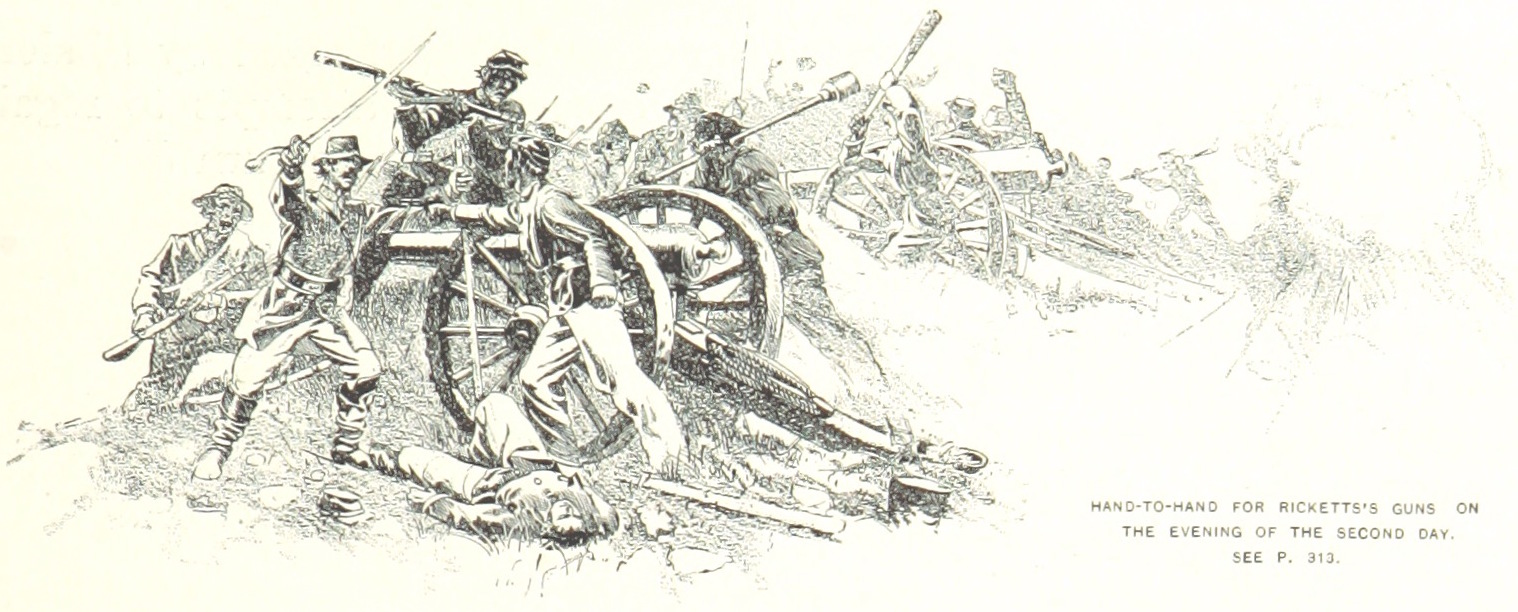
Hand-to-hand fighting over Rickett's guns

The Confederate attack began with a Rebel yell against the Ohio regiments at the stone wall. Just beforehand, Ames had sent the 17th Connecticut from its place on the left of the line to a position in the center. This left a gap, which Hays's Louisianans exploited, and they bounded over the stone wall. Other troops exploited other weak spots in the line, and soon some of the Confederates had reached the batteries at the top of the hill, while others fought in the darkness with the four remaining Union regiments on the line behind the stone wall. On the crest of the hill, the gunners of Captain Michael Wiedrich's New York battery and Captain R. Bruce Ricketts's Pennsylvania battery engaged in hand-to-hand combat against the invaders. Major Samuel Tate of the 6th North Carolina wrote afterward:

75 North Carolinians of the Sixth Regiment and 12 Louisianians of Hays's brigade scaled the walls and planted the colors of the Sixth North Carolina and Ninth Louisiana on the guns. It was now fully dark. The enemy stood with tenacity never before displayed by them, but with bayonet, clubbed musket, sword, pistol, and rocks from the wall, we cleared the heights and silenced the guns.

— Major Samuel Tate, Official report

Harry Pfanz provides an alternative view that contrasts with Tate's: "Although the Confederates wrote and spoke of occupying the crest of the hill and capturing the batteries there, Union accounts concede less Confederate success. The sparse accounts of Wiedrich's battery say that the Confederates attacked suddenly and violently and entered the battery's position but insist that they were there only briefly." The collapse of "Cemetery Hill, the keystone of the Union line," "would have certainly required Meade to at least abandon his position" at Gettysburg, but the following day, artillery anchored here aided the repulse of the famous attack by Pickett, Pettigrew, Trimble, Wilcox & Lang.

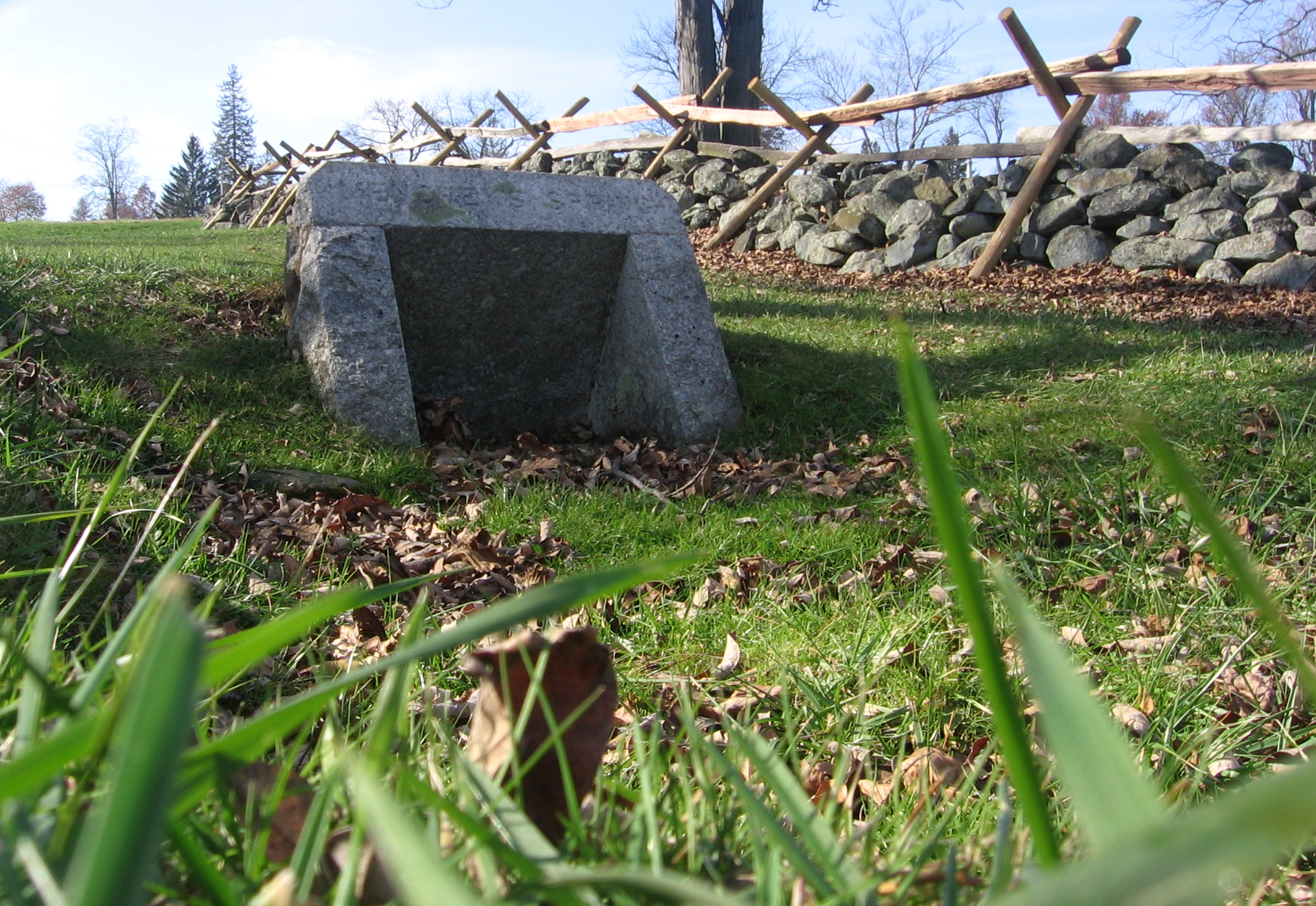
Menchey's Spring, where a number of soldiers from the 54th New York were shot by a Confederate marksman.

Generals Howard and Schurz heard the commotion and rushed the 58th and 119th New York of Col. Włodzimierz Krzyżanowski's brigade from West Cemetery Hill to the aid of Wiedrich's battery. Howard's lines were getting thin, so he sent for help to Maj. Gen. Winfield S. Hancock of the II Corps. Hancock ordered one of his brigades under Col. Samuel S. Carroll to rush from Cemetery Ridge and assist the defenders. They arrived at the double-quick, charging through the dark from the cemetery, just as the Confederate attack was starting to ebb. Carroll's men secured Ricketts's battery and swept the North Carolinians down the hill. Over at Wiedrich's battery, Krzyżanowski led his men to sweep the Louisiana attackers down the hill until they reached the base and "flopped down" for Wiedrich's guns to fire canister at the retreating Confederates.

Defending East Cemetery Hill would have been much more difficult had the overall attack been better coordinated. To the northwest, Maj. Gen. Robert Rodes's division was not ready to attack until Early's fight was almost over. It had filed west from the town and into the fields along the dirt path that is now Long Lane, where it stopped after advancing a short distance in the darkness. Brig. Gen. Dodson Ramseur, the leading brigade commander, saw the futility of a night assault against two lines of Union troops behind stone walls, backed up by significant artillery. Rodes's after-battle report also expressed concern about a lack of cooperation from the adjoining division on A.P. Hill's left flank. Maj. Gen. William Dorsey Pender had been wounded by a shell that afternoon and Brig. Gen. James H. Lane was in command of Pender's division. Ewell sent a staff officer to speak with Lane, who explained that his orders were to attack if a "favorable opportunity presented." When Ewell informed Lane that his attack was starting and requested cooperation, Lane sent back no reply.

Losses on both sides were severe; among the casualties was Col. Avery, who was struck in the neck by a musket ball, felling him from his horse, where he was discovered after the charge by several of his soldiers and Major Tate of the 6th North Carolina. Unable to speak from his mortal wound, Avery scribbled a simple note for Tate: "Major, tell my father I died with my face to the enemy. I. E. Avery." He died the following day.

=== Battle of Gettysburg, Third Day ===
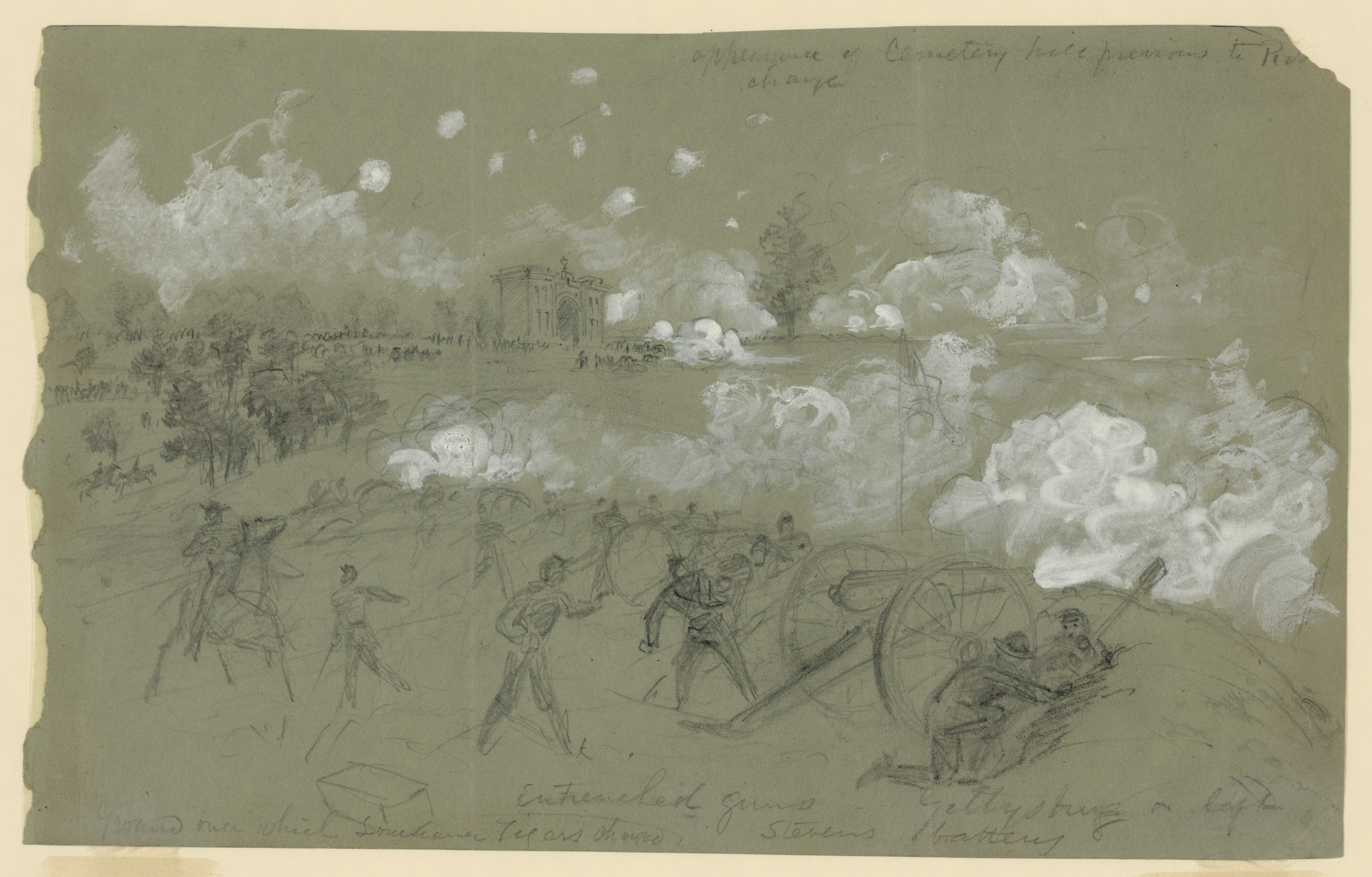
Appearance of Cemetery Hill previous to Pickett's Charge, sketched by Alfred Waud

On July 3, there was no infantry attack on Cemetery Hill; the primary Confederate attacks were on Culp's Hill and on the lower portion of Cemetery Ridge. Union cannons on Cemetery Hill counter fired on the Confederate artillery barrage that preceded Pickett's Charge and provided antipersonnel support fire during the Confederate infantry attack. National Park Service historian Troy Harman has written that Robert E. Lee's ultimate objective for the assaults by Longstreet on July 2 and July 3 was actually Cemetery Hill, rolling the Union left flank up Cemetery Ridge.

=== Aftermath ===
Post-battle, East Cemetery Hill was occupied for several weeks by state militiamen, who established a tented camp site to maintain a military presence, secure the battlefield from looters and curiosity seekers, collect remaining military weapons, and provide manpower and services for the area's hospitals. Elizabeth C. Thorn (pregnant wife of the keeper of Evergreen Cemetery who was at war), her parents, and hired hands dug 105 graves for soldiers killed at or near Cemetery Hill.

The Gettysburg National Cemetery was established in 1863 north of the Evergreen Cemetery. Abraham Lincoln's Gettysburg Address was delivered there during the Consecration of the National Cemetery at Gettysburg.

=== Postbellum history ===
The 1867 National Homestead at Gettysburg operated as an orphanage at the north foot of the hill, and an 1878 wooden observation tower of 40 ft (12 m) East Cemetery Hill had been built near the monument for Battery B, Pennsylvania Light Artillery. The 1893–1917 Gettysburg Electric Railway was on several sides of the hill, and the 1921–2008 Gettysburg National Museum operated on the west side of Cemetery Hill along the Taneytown Road. The areas on the northern and western slopes of the hill are now largely occupied by tourist-related businesses (hotels, restaurants, gift shops, battlefield tour agencies, private museums, etc.). The military importance of the heights is not as evident today since the once commanding view has been blocked by this sprawl.

== See also ==
- Cemetery Ridge — also on the battlefield.
