= Edward Tiffin Harrison Warren =

Edward T. H. Warren
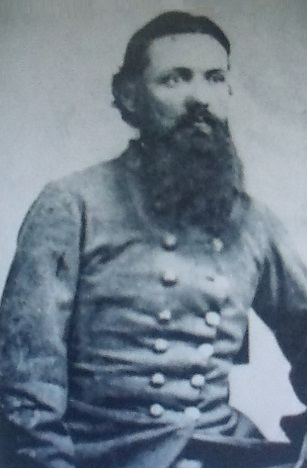
- Edward T. H. Warren
- Born: June 19, 1829; Harrisonburg, Virginia
- Died: May 5, 1864 (aged 34); Locust Grove, Orange County, Virginia
- Burial place: Woodbine Cemetery, Harrisonburg, Virginia
- Military career
- Allegiance: Confederate States of America
- Branch: Confederate States Army
- Service years: 1861–64 (CSA)
- Rank: Colonel
- Conflicts: American Civil War: First Battle of Bull Run; First Battle of Winchester; Battle of Antietam; Battle of Fredericksburg; Battle of Chancellorsville; Battle of Gettysburg; Battle of Mine Run; Battle of the Wilderness

Edward Tiffin Harrison Warren (June 19, 1829 – May 5, 1864) was a Virginia lawyer and military colonel who commanded a Virginia infantry regiment in the Army of Northern Virginia during the American Civil War. He died in the Battle of the Wilderness on May 5, 1864.

== Early and family life ==
Warren was born in Rockingham County, Virginia to the former Harriet Rice and her farmer husband Jehu Warren. Their family included an older brother, William Rice Warren and at least four younger sisters. Their father died in 1851. Edward received an education appropriate to his class. In 1855 Warren married Virginia Magruder (known as Jennie), in 1855 at Frascati in Orange County, Virginia. They lived, beginning in 1856, in Harrisonburg, the Rockingham County seat, at what is now the E.T.Warren-Sipe House. (The house served as a hospital following the Gettysburg campaign. Joseph W. Latimer, the "boy major," a Confederate artillerist, died there on August 1, 1863.) Although his father may not have owned slaves, in the 1860 federal census, Warren owned $16,000 in real estate as well as $5000 in personal property, some of which a different schedule enumerated as four enslaved Blacks, and another person with the same surname on the same page also owned several slaves. Warren's household also included his wife, their young son and daughter, as well as 65 and 49 year old women who owned $12000 and $6000 worth of personal property, respectively, and may have been boarders. Their son, James Magruder Warren (1856-1896), became a prominent local physician in the late nineteenth century.

== Prewar career ==
Warren was admitted to the Virginia bar and by 1860 was a lawyer practicing in Rockingham County and nearby areas. He was elected a lieutenant in the Valley Guards, a local militia company. In that role, he attended the trial and execution of John Brown in 1859. He was elected to Harrisonburg's town council the next year but resigned after the outbreak of war.

== Civil War ==
The Valley Guards were incorporated into the 10th Virginia Infantry after the war began. Warren was commissioned lieutenant colonel of the 10th Virginia on August 1, 1861. As the lieutenant colonel, Warren served at the First Battle of Bull Run, where the regiment served in the brigade of Brig. Gen. Edmund Kirby Smith. He became colonel on May 8, 1862, after Colonel Simeon B. Gibbons was killed at the Battle of McDowell in May 1862.

The 10th Virginia served under Stonewall Jackson in Jackson's Valley Campaign. At the First Battle of Winchester on May 25, 1862, Warren took his regiment to Brig. Gen. Richard Taylor's left flank to support his attack on the Union left. He was serving at the time under Col. Samuel V. Fulkerson in the absence of ailing Brig. Gen. William B. Taliaferro. Under Taliaferro's command, Warren's regiment also helped stop Col. Samuel S. Carroll's raid on Port Republic before the Battle of Port Republic on June 9, 1862.

Warren missed the Battle of Cedar Mountain, in which the regiment was commanded by Maj. Joshua Stover and the Second Battle of Bull Run, where it was commanded by Lt. Col. Samuel T. Walker. Warren commanded Taliaferro's brigade in the early stages of the Maryland Campaign of 1862, but his regiment was left to garrison Martinsburg, West Virginia, after the federals abandoned the town. Col. James W. Jackson commanded the brigade at the Battle of Antietam.

Warren led the brigade at Fredericksburg and Chancellorsville. Warren's brigade of Taliaferro's division was in reserve at Fredericksburg, supporting A.P. Hill's Light Division. After the breakthrough of the Pennsylvania Reserves, his command was brought forward to help fill a gap in the line. Brig. Gen. Raleigh E. Colston was assigned the brigade, but he led the division at Chancellorsville. Consequently, Warren returned to brigade command, and his brigade was in the second line of Stonewall Jackson's surprise attack on the Union XI Corps on May 3, 1863. Brig. Gen. Robert Rodes, commanding the first line, called the brigade forward to help overcome federal resistance near Wilderness Church. Col. Warren was severely wounded while leading an attack.

At Gettysburg, Warren led his regiment under Brig. Gen. George H. Steuart in the attack on Culp's Hill. Steuart's brigade was at the left of the attack by Maj. Gen. Edward "Allegheny" Johnson on the position of the Union XII Corps on July 2, 1863. Warren's 10th Virginia was on the left of Steuart's line, and his unit advanced into a portion of the federal position left empty when troops were pulled out to go to the embattled left flank of the Army of the Potomac. Warren's report suggests that he was confused by the gathering dark and did not realize how near he was to the federal supply line on the Baltimore Pike. On the next day, Warren's regiment was deployed as skirmishers to protect the left flank when Johnson renewed his failed attack on Culp's Hill. The regiment lost nearly 40% of about 150 troops engaged.

Warren's 10th Virginia was not engaged in the Bristoe Campaign in the fall of 1863, but it did fight in the Battle of Mine Run. It was involved in an engagement with the Union III Corps at the Battle of Payne's Farm.

== Death and legacy ==
In the Battle of the Wilderness on May 5, 1864, Warren died after receiving seven bullet wounds. He was buried at the Woodbine Cemetery in Harrisonburg. The Small Special Collections Library of the University of Virginia makes his papers available to researchers. Warren expressed strong opinions in letters to his wife. He dismissed Turner Ashby as "rather a humbug." Warren also complained how many of his men Stonewall Jackson had gotten killed.
