= Amos Humiston =

Union Army soldier in the American Civil War

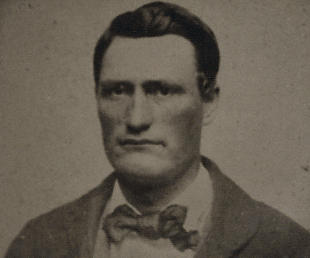
- Born: April 26, 1830; Owego, New York, US
- Died: July 1, 1863 (aged 33); Gettysburg, Pennsylvania, US; 39°49′55″N 77°13′43″W
- Burial place: Gettysburg National Cemetery
- Relatives: Spouse: Philinda Humiston; Children: Franklin, Alice, Frederick; Descendants: David H. Kelley & Allan Lawrence Cox
- Military career
- Allegiance: United States
- Branch: Union Army
- Service years: 1862–1863
- Rank: Sergeant
- Units: Company C, 154th New York Volunteer Infantry
- Conflicts: American Civil War: Chancellorsville (WIA); Gettysburg †

Amos Humiston (April 26, 1830 – July 1, 1863) was a Union soldier who died at the Battle of Gettysburg during the American Civil War. A photograph of his children that was found with his body led to his identification when it was described in newspapers across the country.

== Civil War ==
Humiston served in the Union Army during the American Civil War. He was wounded at the Battle of Chancellorsville in May 1863, a bullet glancing off his ribs. He was later killed in action on the Gettysburg Battlefield, dying with a photograph of his three children that his wife had mailed to him months earlier. A local girl found the image, and Dr. John Francis Bourns saw it at the girl's father's tavern and subsequently publicized the image in an effort to identify the anonymous soldier who had been carrying it. Though the image itself was not reproduced, it was described in detail in newspapers across the country: "wounded, he had laid himself down to die. In his hands … was an ambrotype containing the portraits of three small children … two boys and a girl ... nine, seven and five years of age, the boys being respectively the oldest and youngest of the three. The youngest boy is sitting in a high chair, and on each side of him are his brother and sister. The eldest boy's jacket is made from the same material as his sister's dress ... [It is] desired that all papers in the country will draw attention [so] the family … may come into possession of it" (The Philadelphia Inquirer, October 19, 1863).

Image used to identify Humiston

Humiston's wife in Portville, New York—who had not received a letter from her husband since the Battle of Gettysburg—responded to the photograph's description in the American Presbyterian of October 29. She subsequently confirmed the image was of her children after Bourns sent her a carte de visite copy of the ambrotype. Bourns took the original image to Humiston's widow.

The family subsequently resided at the National Homestead at Gettysburg (opened October 1866) for three years until the widow remarried, when they relocated to Massachusetts.

== Historiography ==
After numerous postbellum retellings and a 1993 memorial regarding the story at Gettysburg, Pennsylvania, historian Mark H. Dunkelman published Humiston's 1999 biography using Humiston's war letters—including a May 1863 poem of how Humiston missed his family.

== In popular culture ==
Humiston's service at Gettysburg is dramatized in the 2011 documentary film Gettysburg.

In the 2012 film Abraham Lincoln: Vampire Hunter, a Federal unit, presumably the 154th New York Volunteer Infantry, is attacked by Confederate vampires and only one member survives. A photograph falls out of a soldier's hand and falls to the ground near the camera. It is the same one that Sergeant Humiston carried.

Russell Moore wrote and recorded a song about Humiston, titled "A Picture of Three Children", for the 2013 album God Didn't Choose Sides: Civil War True Stories about Real People.
