= 154th New York Infantry Regiment =

American civil war military unit (1862–1865)

- Active: August 19, 1862 - June 11, 1865
- Country: United States
- Allegiance: Union
- Branch: Infantry
- Size: 891 (Note: As reported back to Adjutant General Hillhouse, on December 31, 1862) 543 (Note: As reported back to Adjutant General Sprague, on December 31, 1864)
- Equipment: Enfield Rifled Muskets
- Engagements: Battle of Chancellorsville; Battle of Gettysburg; Battle of Wauhatchie; Battle of Missionary Ridge; Atlanta campaign Battle of Resaca; Battle of Dallas; Battle of New Hope Church; Battle of Allatoona; Battle of Pine Hill; Battle of Marietta; Battle of Kolb's Farm; Battle of Kennesaw Mountain; Battle of Peachtree Creek; Siege of Atlanta; Sherman's March to the Sea; Carolinas campaign Battle of Bentonville

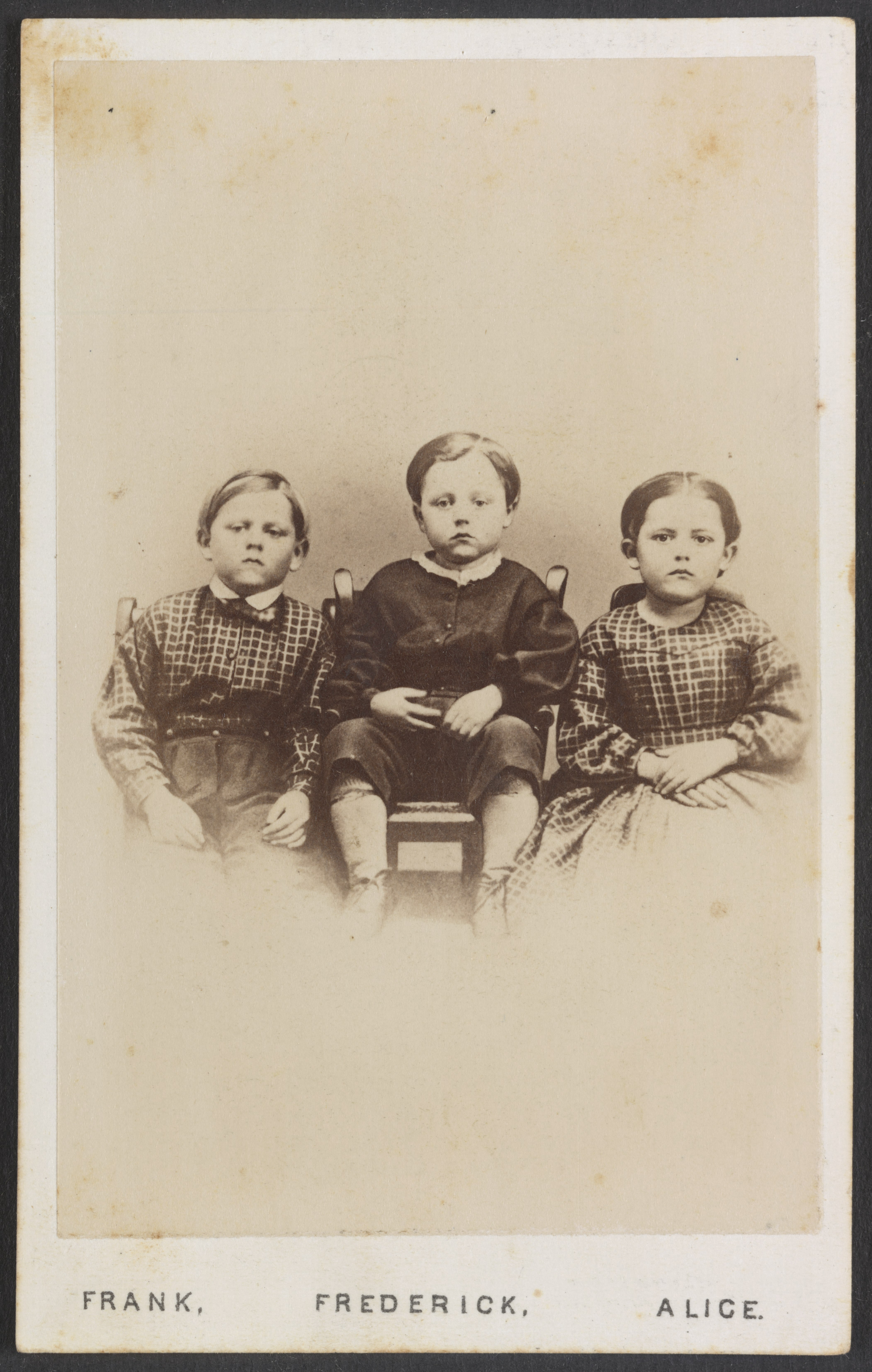
Portrait of Frank, Frederick, and Alice Humiston, children of Sergeant Amos Humiston of Co. C, 154th New York Infantry Regiment, who died at the Battle of Gettysburg with the photograph in his hands

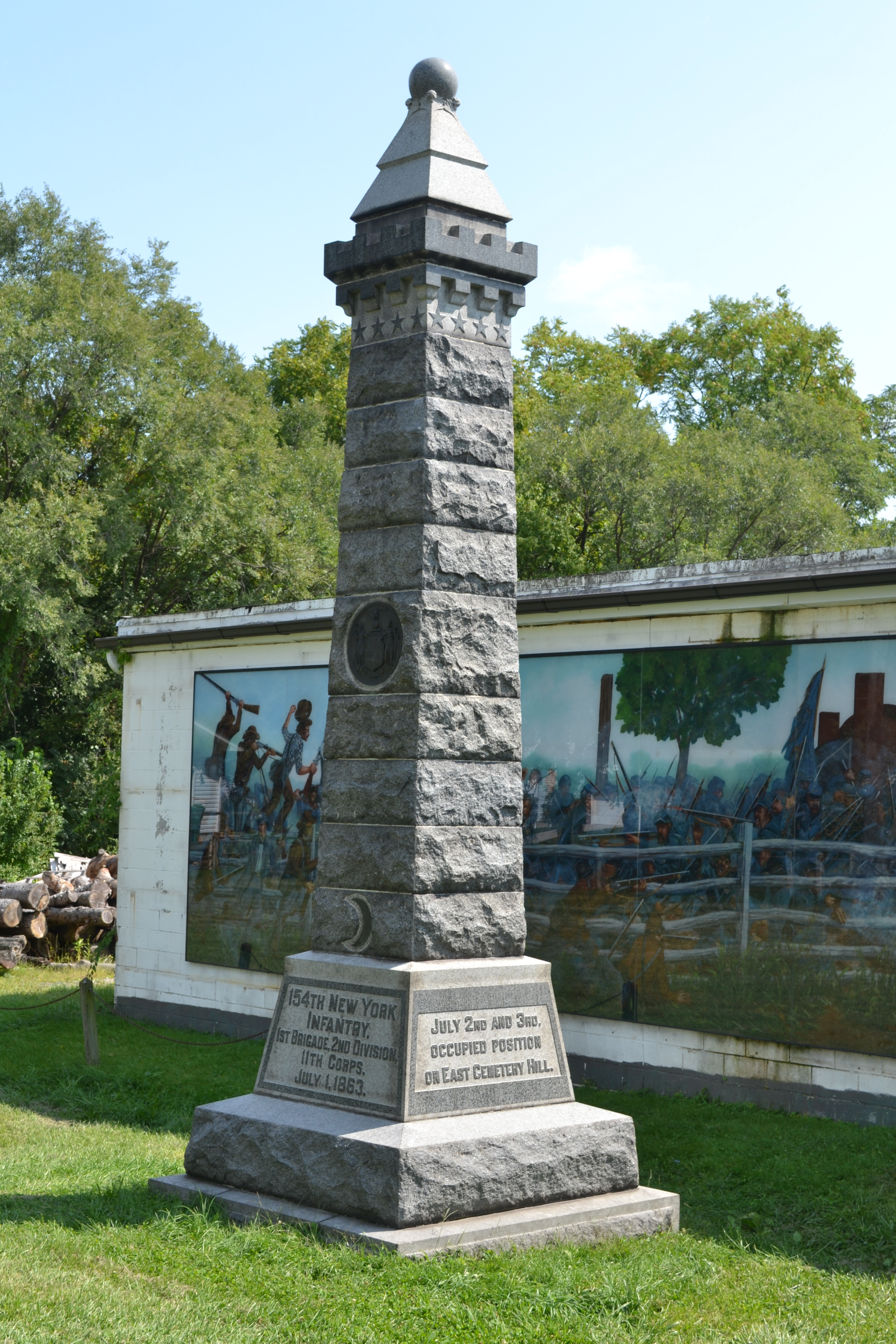
Monument to the 154th New York Volunteer Infantry at Gettysburg

The 154th New York Infantry Regiment (aka, "The Hardtack Regiment") was an infantry regiment in the U.S. Army during the American Civil War.

== Service ==
The 154th New York Infantry was organized at Jamestown, Chautauqua County, New York beginning August 19, 1862, and mustered in for three years service on September 24, 1862, under the command of Colonel Addison G. Rice.

=== Training and initial deployment ===
The regiment served in the eastern theater with the Army of the Potomac (AoP) until it was sent west as part of Hooker's reinforcement of the Army of the Cumberland (AoC). It remained in the west through the Atlanta Campaign, the March to the Sea, and the Carolinas Campaign, the last two as part of the Army of Georgia (AoG).

After the first year of war and the debacle on the Peninsula caused the Lincoln administration to realize that the war would take longer than first expected and many more men, on July 1, 1862, Lincoln issued a call for 300,000 volunteers for three-year commitments. New York's quota from this call was twenty-eight regiments. The state, in turn, immediately ordered most of its thirty-two senatorial districts to constitute regimental districts with a regimental muster center in each. New York's Thirty-Second Senatorial District was composed of Cattaraugus and Chautauqua counties. A Cattaraugus County lawyer and state assemblyman from Ellicottsville, Addison G. Rice, was appointed a Colonel for the recruiting effort. The district exceeded its quota by 100% by raising twenty-one companies, twelve from Chautauqua County, eight from Cattaraugus, and a sharpshooters company recruited at large in the district. On September 11, 1862, ten Chautauqua companies mustered into the U.S. service as the 112th New York. The following day that regiment and the sharpshooter company left for the front. (Note: Known as the "Chautauqua Regiment", the 112th went on to serve in the Siege of Suffolk and the operations at Charleston before transferring to the Army of the James during the sige of Petersburg.)

On Sunday, September 14, the two remaining Chautauqua companies reported to Colonel Rice for duty joining the eight Cattaraugus companies as Company E and F in the next regiment. They blended into the 154th Regiment alongside their Cattaraugus County neighbors, and the ten companies mustered in the next week, on September 24 and 25. On Friday, the officers mustered into federal service the next day, and on Monday, September 29, the 154th New York left for Virginia. The regiment's companies were recruited principally:

- A — Ellicottsville, Carlton, Cold Spring, Humphrey, Randolph, Great Valley, Carrolton, Little Valley, Conewango, South Valley, Salamanca, and Napoli
- B — New Albion, Otto, Dayton, Perrysburg, Leon, Mansfield and Persia
- C — Portville, Hinsdale, Ischua, Allegany, Humphrey, and Olean
- D — Machias, Yorkshire, Freedom, Franklinville, Ashford, and Lyndon (Note: This was a Chautauqua County company recruited inland to the east of the county.)
- E — Portland, Westfield, Ripley, and Chautauqua (Note: Again, a Chautauqua County company from the inland towns.)
- F — Charlotte, Arkwright, Gerry, French Creek, and Freedom
- G — Ashford, Ellicottsville, East Otto, Allegany, Mansfield, Olean, Jamestown, and Hillsdale
- H — Randolph, Napoli, Salamanca, Little Valley, Great Valley, Jamestown, Carrolton, South Valley, Cold Spring, and Farmington
- I — Olean, Hinsdale, Salamanca, Allegany, Great Valley, Humphrey, New Albion, Portville, Machias and Yorkshire
- K — Conewango, Perrysburg, Dayton, Persia, Leon and New Albion

The regimental staff during its service consisted of:

- COLs — Patrick H. Jones (Note: Colonel Jones had already served with distinction as major of the 37th New York, from which regiment he was promoted to the colonelcy of his new command.) and Lewis D. Warner
- LTCs — Henry C. Loomis, Daniel B. Allen, Lewis D. Warner, and Harrison Cheney
- MAJs — Samuel G. Love, Jacob H. Ten Eyck, Daniel B. Allen, Lewis D. Warner, Harrison Cheney, and Alfred W. Benson

Most men of the regiment coming from south central and southwestern New York were native-born and from a farming background. (Note: Between 25 and 30 percent of the U.S. Army were foreign-born during the rebellion, but only 11 percent of the 154th were. In addition, whereas roughly 48 percent of the U.S. Army in that time were farmers or farm laborers, 74 percent of the 154th were.) There were some rivermen and canal men, however, who had worked the rivers canals between the Great Lakes and the industrial centers of Pittsburgh. There were even a handful of Great Lake sailors who had sailed all around the Old Northwest.

On Tuesday, September 30, 1862, the 154th left the state and was assigned to the 1st brigade, 2nd (Steinwehr's) division, XI corps, which was stationed during the fall of 1862 in Northern Virginia in the vicinity of Centerville. They missed the battles at Antietam and Fredericksburg.

The regiment went into winter quarters with the corps at Stafford, VA in December 1862. From Tuesday, January 20 through Saturday January 214, 1863, the regiment slogged up and down the Rappahannock during Burnside's infamous Mud March.

=== Combat service in the east ===
==== Chancellorsville and the Buschbeck line ====
Burnside's relief by Hooker raised morale as the Army prepared for its next move, a plan to get Lee out of his positions at Fredericksburg. Upon assuming command, Hooker took advantage of improved military intelligence about the positioning and capabilities of the opposing army, superior to that available to his predecessors in army command. His chief of staff, Butterfield, commissioned COL George H. Sharpe from the 120th New York Infantry to organize a new Bureau of Military Information (BMI) in the Army of the Potomac, part of the provost marshal function under BGEN Marsena R. Patrick. (Note: Prior to Hooker, intelligence gatherers, such as Allan Pinkerton and his detective agency, gathered information only by interrogating prisoners, deserters, "contrabands" (slaves), and refugees. The Army of the Potomac also had used Thaddeus S. C. Lowe and his balloons to observe Lee's positions. The new BMI added other sources including infantry and cavalry reconnaissance, spies, scouts, signal stations.) Hooker soon realized that to avoid bloody direct frontal attacks, he could only cross of the Rappahannock by subterfuge.

To cause Lee to abandon his fortifications by Fredericksburg and withdraw toward Richmond, Hooker planned to send his 10,000 cavalrymen under MGEN George Stoneman across the Rappahannock far upstream and raid deep into the rear cutting Lee's lines of communication and supply. Hooker would then send his infantry across the Rappahannock in pursuit, attacking Lee when he was moving and vulnerable. On Monday, April 13, heavy rains made the river crossing site at Sulphur Spring impassable. Hooker's second plan was to launch his cavalry and infantry simultaneously in a bold double envelopment of Lee's army. Stoneman's cavalry would make a second attempt at its deep strategic raid, but at the same time, 42,000 men in three corps (V, XI, XII Corps) would stealthily march to cross the Rappahannock upriver at Kelly's Ford. They would then move south across the Rapidan at Germanna and Ely's Ford, concentrating at Chancellorsville, and strike Lee from the west.

As members of Buschbeck's (Note: Adolph Buschbeck, born in Koblenz, Germany, on March 23, 1822, immigrated in 1849 to Philadelphia, Pennsylvania, where he taught mathematics at a Philadelphia high school. He first commanded the 27th Pennsylvania Infantry and later the 1st Brigade, 2nd Division of XI Corps at Chancellorsville returning to command it when it was transferred to the Army of the Cumberland in the west.) 1st Brigade (Note: The brigade consisted of: The 27th Pennsylvania, an almost exclusively German unit from Philadelphia commanded by LTC Lorenz Cantador; the 73rd Pennsylvania, also largely German from Philadelphia, commanded by CPT Daniel F. Kelly; the 134th New York, from Schoharie and Schenectady counties and commanded by LTC Allan H. Jackson; and the 154th.) in Von Steinwehr's 2nd Division of Howard's XI Corps, the 154th, then numbering 590 men in line of battle, moved into positions at Kelly's Ford on April 14.

Over the next two weeks, the 154th and its brigade showed no signs of activity to lull the Rebl cavalry guarding the other side of the ford into complacency while Hooker moved the 42,000 men in the V, XI, and XII Corps stealthily into nearby hidden positions for the crossing. The men, unaware of the Hooker's plans, patrolled the riverbank and were struck by the hostility of the local white population and friendliness of the black. The 154th's baptism of fire happened in the early evening on Tuesday, April 28, 1863, at 18:00.

Completely surprising the Confederates, the 154th, paddled out of Marsh Run, 500 yards downstream in canvas pontoon boats. Under cover of sharpshooters from their 73rd Pennsylvania brigade mates, they seized a bridgehead on the southern side. After receiving a volley from the Rebel troopers with no effect, they spread out to defend the crossing site. While on guard, the 15th New York Engineers built a pontoon bridge. Four and half hours later, the three corps began crossing on the bridge. They remained until the crossing was complete and then moved on to Chancellorsville. Following their corps, they crossed the Rapidan at Germanna Ford taking the Wilderness Road to Wilderness Tavern and turned east, or left onto the junction of Orange Turnpike and Orange Plank Road.

Their position was near Dowdall's Tavern, where with Battery I, 1st New York Light Artillery, Wiedrich's Battery, it was serving as headquarters guard. (Note: The XI Corps had its right left hanging when Sickles moved his III Corps forward to the Catharine Furnace. From West to east, the XI Corps' line was the 1st Division under BGEN Charles Devens, Jr., the 3rd Division under MGEN Carl Schurz, and the 2nd Division under Adolph Von Steinwehr) While elements of the corps further right, westward, started seeing indications of activity to their right in the woods west along the turnpike, the westernmost division commander, Devens, and Howard dismissed these reports as the imaginings of nervous troops. (Note: Brigade and regimental commanders refused their lines on the right in several cases, but none could get Devens nor Howard to shift facing to the west.) Ergo, when Jackson struck the AoP's right flank at 17:30 on Saturday afternoon, May 2, 1863, the corps collapsed and fled to the east along the turnpike. The other two division commanders, Schurz and Steinwehr, despite obeying Howard's order to keep their divisions facing to the south had warily positioned a few of their units to watch their flank, unaware that Devens had done no such thing and was completely unprepared to receive an attack from the woods. As such, when the Rebels advanced and drove the XI Corps ahead of them, any resistance that did occur was sporadic and uncoordinated.

Individual regiments and brigades, such as those in Schurz's 3rd Division around the Hawkins farm held their ground to stem the tide of the enemy advance before retreating in good order. These stands that caused the Rebel lines to contract and condense as they pushed between and around them. Shortly afterward, Howard's frightened stragglers rallied around the Buschbeck's brigade (including the 154th) who had thrown up a hasty defensive position at Dowdall's Tavern, to become known as the "Buschbeck line". (Note: These unfinished breastworks had been built by BGEN Barlow's 2nd Brigade of Von Steinwehr's 2nd Division. Fortuitously, they had been built facing west.) and slowed the enemy assault, at least for a few moments. Many of the 73rd Pennsylvania retreating, fell in with the 154th and stood alongside them as they lay and fought in their breastworks. These daring but futile actions were mostly the inspiration of small-unit commanders as the leadership on the brigade, division, and corps level struggled to bring order to the mob that an hour before had been the right flank of the Union Army. The 154th at Buschbeck's line paid dearly. During its fighting at Chancellorsville, it lost 1 officer and 31 enlisted men killed, 10 enlisted men mortally wounded, 3 officers and 68 enlisted men wounded, and 4 officers and 113 enlisted men captured or missing. (Note: COL Jones was wounded and one of the four officers captured.)

==== Gettysburg and Kuhn's Brickyard ====
Its losses in killed, wounded, and captured at Chancellorsville, were so large that the regiment numbered only about 300 men when it entered the Gettysburg Campaign where it suffered more severe losses. At Gettysburg, it was heavily engaged in the battle of the first day and in the defense of Cemetery Hill the second day.

On the 30th of June, 50 men of the regiment, together with 50 men each from the 27th Pennsylvania, 73rd Pennsylvania, and 164th New York were ordered, under the 154th's MAJ Lewis D. Warner, to make a reconnaissance out to Strykersville. Leaving at 05:00, Wednesday, July 1, 1863, they set out and thus were not engaged in the first day's fight at Gettysburg.

The rest of the 154th awoke at their camp near the Daughters of Charity Convent at Emmitsburg, MD, about 11 miles south of Gettysburg. The regiment had been on the road for three weeks since leaving Stafford County, and had endured difficult, long, dusty marches in the early summer heat. They were warmly greeted with food in Maryland by Union sympathizers along their route. At the Emmitsburg convent (Note: In 1809, Elizabeth Ann Seton accepted the Sulpicians' invitation and moved to Emmitsburg. A year later, she established the Saint Joseph's Academy and Free School dedicated to Catholic girls' education with help from Samuel Sutherland Cooper, a wealthy convert and seminarian at the newly established Mount Saint Mary's University, begun by John Dubois, S.S., and the Sulpicians. She established the convent, the first congregation of religious sisters founded in the United States, and its school, dedicated to the care of the children of the poor, the first free Catholic school in America. This modest beginning marked the start of the Catholic parochial school system in the United States. Initially called the Sisters of Charity of St. Joseph's, in 1811, the sisters adopted the rules of the Daughters of Charity, co-founded in France by Vincent de Paul and Louise de Marillac.), the nuns served them soft bread and sweet milk.

COL Buschbeck had departed on a leave of absence on June 1, and the 29th New York had mustered out as it was a two-year regiment. Replacing it was the 134th New York commanded by COL Charles R. Coster. (Note: The 23-year-old Coster had enlisted as a private in the 7th New York Militia in April 1861, later transferring to the 12th U.S. Infantry where he was appointed a first lieutenant. He served in BGEN George Sykes's division of V Corps in the Seven Days Battles, being commended by his superiors for his conduct at the Battle of Gaines' Mill on June 27, 1862. On October 8, 1862, Coster was named colonel of the recently organized 134th New York Volunteer Infantry. By December 31, 1862, the regiment belonged to COL Orland Smith's 2nd Brigade of von Steinwehr's 2nd Division, XI Corps with whom it fought at Chancellorsville under BGEN Francis C. Barlow, who had been appointed brigade commander in place of Smith. During May 1863, Coster's regiment transferred to Buschbeck's 1st Brigade.) As the senior officer, Coster took command of the brigade.

The 2nd Division was the last one of the XI Corps to reach Cemetery Hill by the Emmitsburg Pike. The remaining 250 men in the 154th in the 1st Brigade, arrived there at about 16:00, on the double-quick, filed into the cemetery and cleaned guns, and immediately (with the 27th Pennsylvania and 134th New York, only,) double-quicked down through the town, out on the Harrisburg Road, and formed line of battle where its monument now stands, a short distance north of Stevens Run.

This location was John Kuhn's brickyard on North Stratton Street in the northeastern outskirts of Gettysburg. It was a five-acre pentagonal lot enclosed by sturdy rail fences with the house on the street and the brickworks—a wooden barn, dome-shaped brick kilns, and a mill behind it. It was, at that time, still a largely rural landscape apart from the main town with a slope north of it and wheat fields to the east and south.

At this time the broken lines of Schurz's troops were in full retreat, and about as soon as the 154th (with the 27th Pennsylvania on its left and the 134th New York on its right) had formed line of battle, the enemy in overwhelming numbers fell upon them, in front and on both flanks.

It was a costly battle, with the 154th losing 6 killed, 21 wounded, and 173 missing. It accompanied the army on its return to Virginia.

=== Combat service in the west ===
In September 1863, after the defeat at Chickamauga, the 154th and its corps (along with the XII Corps) was ordered to Tennessee to reinforce Gen. Rosecrans besieged in Chattanooga. In October it was lightly engaged in the midnight battle of Wauhatchie and had 6 men wounded at Missionary Ridge. When the XX corps was formed in April 1864, the 154th was assigned to the 2nd brigade. 2nd division (Geary's "White Stars") with which it fought from Chattanooga to Atlanta, and then to the end of the Carolina campaign. At Rocky Face Ridge, the first important battle of the Atlanta campaign, the regiment behaved with distinguished gallantry and sustained its heaviest loss-13 killed and 37 wounded. It also lost heavily at Kennesaw Mountain, where 36 were killed and wounded. At the conclusion of the campaign through the Carolinas it marched with the XX corps to Washington and participated in the Grand Review. Commanded by Col. Warner, it was mustered out at Bladensburgh, MD., June 11, 1865. The regiment lost during service 2 officers and 84 men killed and mortally wounded; 2 officers and 193 men died of disease and other causes, a total of 281 of whom 1 officer and 90 men died in Confederate prisons.

== Affiliations, battle honors, detailed service, and casualties ==
=== Organizational affiliation ===
Attached to:

- 1st Brigade, 2nd Division, XI Corps, Army of the Potomac, to October, 1863
- 1st Brigade, 2nd Division, XI Army Corps, Army of the Cumberland to April, 1864
- 2nd Brigade, 2nd Division, XX Corps, Army of the Cumberland, to October 1864
- 2nd Brigade, 2nd Division, XX Army Corps, Army of Georgia, to June, 1865

=== List of battles ===
The official list of battles in which the regiment bore a part:

- Battle of Chancellorsville
- Battle of Gettysburg
- Battle of Wauhatchie
- Battle of Chattanooga
- Battle of Missionary Ridge
- Battle of Rocky Face Ridge
- Battle of Resaca
- Battle of Dallas
- Battle of Kennesaw Mountain
- Battle of Pine Mountain
- Battle of Golgotha
- Battle of Kolb's Farm
- Battle of Peachtree Creek
- March to the Sea
- Campaign of the Carolinas
- Bennett House

=== Detailed service ===
==== 1862 ====
- Left New York for Washington, D. C, September 30, 1862.
- Joined Corps at Fairfax, Va., October 2, 1862, and duty there until November 1.
- Movement to Warrenton, thence to Germantown November 1–20.
- March to Fredericksburg, Va., December 10–15.
- At Falmouth, Va., until April 27, 1863.
- Battle of Fredericksburg, VA., December 12–15

==== 1863 ====
- "Mud March" January 20–24, 1863.
- Chancellorsville Campaign April 27-May 6.
- Battle of Chancellorsville May 1–5.
- Gettysburg Campaign June 11-July.24.
- Battle of Gettysburg July 1–3.
  - The Brickyard, July 1
- Pursuit of Lee July.5-24.
- At Bristoe Station until September 24.
- Movement to Bridgeport, Ala., September 24-October 3.
- March along line of Nashville & Chattanooga Railroad to Lookout Valley, Tenn., October 25–28.
- Reopening Tennessee River October 26–29.
- Battle of Wauhatchie, Tenn., October 28–29.
- ChattanoogaRinggold Campaign November 23–27.
- Orchard Knob November 23.
- Tunnel Hill November 24–25.
- Mission Ridge November 25.
- March to relief of Knoxville November 28-December 17.
- Duty in Lookout Valley until May, 1864.

==== 1864 ====
- Atlanta (Ga.) Campaign May 1-September 8.
- Demonstration on Rocky Faced Ridge May 8–11.
- Dug Gap or Mill Creek May 8.
- Battle of Resaca May 14–15.
- Near Cassville May 19.
- Advance on Dallas May 22–25.
- New Hope Church May 25.
- Battles about Dallas, New Hope Church and Allatoona Hills May 26-June 5.
- Operations about Marietta and against Kenesaw Mountain June 10-July.2.
- Pine Hill June 11–14.
- Lost Mountain June 15–17.
- Gilgal or Golgotha Church June 15.
- Muddy Creek June 17.
- Noyes Creek June 19.
- Kolb's Farm June 22.
- Assault on Kenesaw June 27.
- Ruff's Station, Smyrna Camp Ground, July.4.
- Chattahoochee River July.5-17.
- Peach Tree Creek July 19–20.
- Siege of Atlanta July.22-August 25.
- Operations at Chattahoochee River Bridge August 26-September 2.
- Occupation of Atlanta September 2-November 15.
- Expedition from Atlanta to Tuckum's Cross Roads October 26–29.
- Near Atlanta November 9.
- March to the sea November 15-December 10.
- Siege of Savannah December 10–21.

==== 1865 ====
- Campaign of the Carolinas January to April, 1865.
- Averysboro, N. C, March 16.
- Battle of Bentonville March 19–21.
- Occupation of Goldsboro March 24.
- Advance on Raleigh April 9–13.
- Occupation of Raleigh April 14.
- Bennett's House April 26.
- Surrender of Johnston and his army.
- March to Washington, D. C, via Richmond, Va., April 29-May 19.
- Grand Review May 24.
- Mustered out June 11, 1865.
- Veterans and Recruits transferred to 102nd New York Infantry.

== Casualties ==
Total casualties for the regiment were 278; 2 officers and 81 enlisted men were killed or mortally wounded, and 2 officers and 193 enlisted men died from illness.

== Armament ==
Soldiers in the 154th were armed with 891 P53 Enfield Rifled Muskets. The regiment traveled during training to the state armory in Elmira where they were issued these arms. By the Chancellorsville campaign, the regiment reported the following survey result to U.S. War Department:

- A — 50 P53 Enfield rifled muskets (Note: When the Vermont-based, American arms company, Robbins & Lawrence's (R&L) went bankrupt after the Crimean War ended, the New York firm of Fox, Henderson & Company, a creditor, agreed to accept 5,600 Pattern 1853 guns to be assembled by Vermont Arms as payment for their credit interest in the now bankrupt company. In 1858 Vermont Arms also failed, and the remaining inventory and assets were sold at auction. The State of New York purchased the completed arms and stored them in their armories. Back in 1856, R&L had also sold precision manufacturing machinery to the newly-established Royal Small Arms factory at Enfield. The machinery allowed the factory to mass produce the rifled muskets so that the parts were interchangeable like the U.S. government manufactured Springfields. To stay competitive, the Belgian arms factory at Liege, and the Birmingham Small Arms company (BSA, later a fampous manufacturer of motorcycles) also purchased similar machinery from Colt and Whitney. The Enfields in New York's inventory were mostly American-made like the Windsors or license-built in Liege, Belgium.) (.58 and .577 cal.)
- B — 65 P53 Enfield rifled muskets (.58 and .577 cal.)
- C — 56 P53 Enfield rifled muskets (.58 and .577 cal.)
- D — 42 P53 Enfield rifled muskets (.58 and .577 cal.)
- E — 65 P53 Enfield rifled muskets (.58 and .577 cal.)
- F — 51 P53 Enfield rifled muskets (.58 and .577 cal.)
- G — 48 P53 Enfield rifled muskets (.58 and .577 cal.)
- H — 47 P53 Enfield rifled muskets (.58 and .577 cal.)
- I — 20 P53 Enfield rifled muskets (.58 and .577 cal.)
- K — 56 P53 Enfield rifled muskets (.58 and .577 cal.)

=== Rifle-muskets ===
Issued weapons

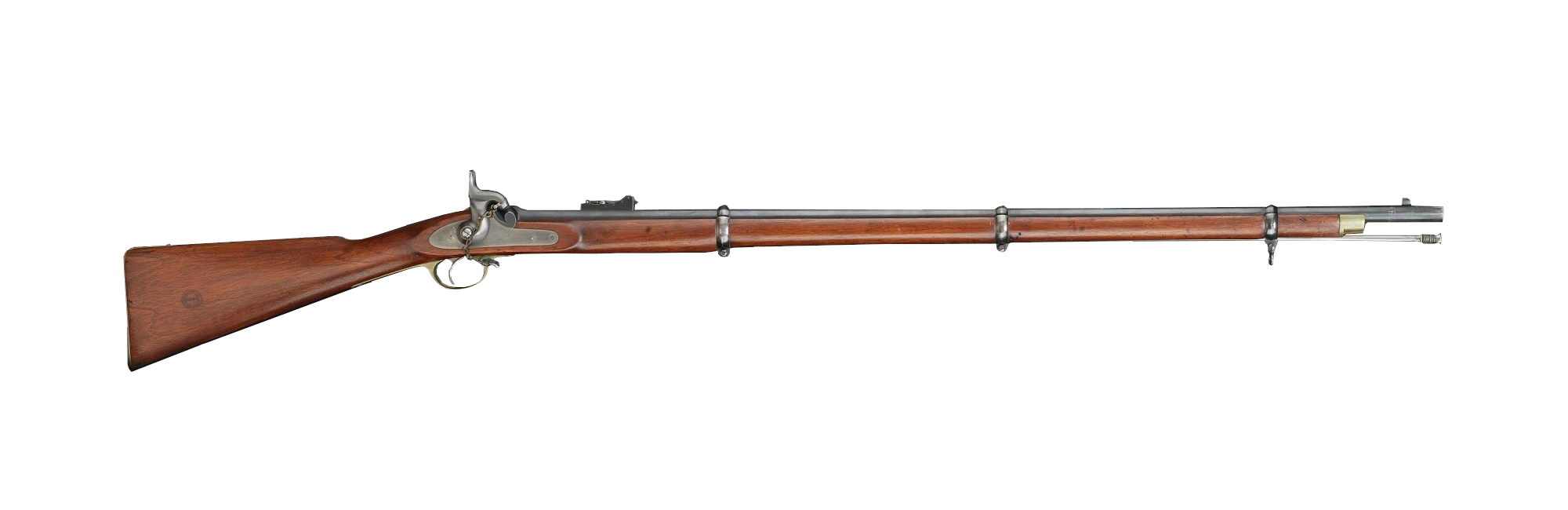
Pattern 1853 Enfield rifle-musket

== Commanders ==
- Colonel Addison G. Rice - provisional colonel during organization, he never received an official commission
- Colonel Patrick Henry Jones
- Colonel Lewis D. Warner
- Lieutenant Colonel Henry C. Loomis - commanded at the Battle of Chancellorsville after Col Jones was wounded in action
- Lieutenant Colonel Daniel B. Allen - commanded at the Battle of Gettysburg

== The 154th New York in art ==
The 154th New York has been featured in Civil War paintings. Examples include:

- The Brickyard Fight - Mark Maritato

== Notable members ==
- Sergeant Amos Humiston, Company C - killed in action at the Battle of Gettysburg, he died clutching a photograph of his three children, which became a symbol of the war's affects on families and led to the creation of the National Homestead at Gettysburg, a residence for widows and orphans

== See also ==
- List of New York Civil War regiments
- New York in the Civil War
