= David H. Kelley =

David Humiston Kelley (April 1, 1924 in Albany, New York – May 19, 2011) was an American archaeologist and epigrapher. He was associated with the University of Nebraska-Lincoln, and later with the University of Calgary. He is most noted for his work on the phonetic analysis and major contributions toward the decipherment of the writing system used by the Maya civilization of pre-Columbian Mesoamerica, the Maya script.

== Work and interests ==
David Kelley was a descendant of Amos Humiston, a Union Army soldier who was killed at the Battle of Gettysburg in 1863.

He graduated from Harvard University with a PhD in 1957. From the late 1950s, he was one of the first Mayanist scholars to give credence to the theories of the Russian linguist and ethnographer Yuri Knorozov concerning the phonetic and syllabic nature of the Maya script, which would later lead to breakthroughs in the script's decipherment. Kelley's landmark 1962 paper, Phoneticism in the Maya Script, would provide important corroborating data of the phonetic interpretation of Maya glyphs, which ran counter to the then-prevailing view that the script lacked phonetic elements.

In addition to his work on scripts and linguistics, he worked on calendrics and archaeoastronomy, particularly on application of archaeoastronomical data to the Maya calendar correlation problem. Kelley and Eugene Milone co-authored Exploring Ancient Skies: An Encyclopedic Survey of Archaeoastronomy (Springer, 2005).

He was also interested in long-range cultural contacts, including trans-Pacific and trans-Atlantic voyages ("Diffusionism").

He also published frequently on mediaeval and ancient genealogies, publishing papers on the Carolingians, the Jewish Exilarchs and the Nibelungs. He was elected a Fellow of the American Society of Genealogists in 1970.

Kelley was a professor emeritus in the Department of Archaeology at the University of Calgary. Before teaching at the University of Calgary, he taught during the 1960s at the University of Nebraska, and before that at Texas Tech. Studying under Alfred M. Tozzer, his doctoral dissertation (1957) at Harvard was entitled "Our Elder Brother Coyote".

He met his wife Jane while they were both students at Harvard, where she also earned a doctorate; hers in Southwestern archaeology. She was also a professor in the department of archaeology in Calgary.

== Published works ==
Academic papers and books published by Kelley include:

- Kelley, David H. (1960). "Calendar Animals and Deities". Southwestern Journal of Anthropology. 16 (3): 317–337. doi:10.1086/soutjanth.16.3.3629035. S2CID 131473640.
- Kelley, David H. (1962). "A History of the Decipherment of Maya Script". Anthropological Linguistics. 4: 1–48.
- Kelley, David H. (January 1962). "Glyphic Evidence for a Dynastic Sequence at Quirigua, Guatemala". American Antiquity. 27 (3). American Antiquity, Vol. 27, No. 3: 323–335. doi:10.2307/277799. JSTOR 277799. S2CID 163767473.
- Kelley, David H. (1965). "The Birth of the Gods at Palenque". Estudios de Cultura Maya. 27 (3): 93–134.
- Kelley, David H. (July 1966). "A Cylinder Seal from Tlatilco". American Antiquity. 31 (5:1). American Antiquity, Vol. 31, No. 5: 744–746. doi:10.2307/2694503. JSTOR 2694503. S2CID 163539953.
- Kelley, David H. (1972). "The Nine Lords of the Night". Studies of the Archaeology of Mexico and Guatemala, University of California Archaeological Research. 16: 58–68.
- Kelley, David H. : Maya Astronomical Tables and Inscriptions, Native American Astronomy. Edited versions of papers presented at a Symposium, held at Colgate University, September 23–26, 1975, Edited by Anthony F. Aveni. Austin: University of Texas Press, 1977., p. 57
- Kelley, David H. : Deciphering the Maya Script, Austin: University of Texas Press, 1976
- Kelley, David H. (1980). "Astronomical Identities of Mesoamerican Gods". Journal for the History of Astronomy. 11 (2): S1–S54. Bibcode:1980JHA....11....1A. doi:10.1177/002182868001100102. S2CID 121684168.
- Kelley, David H. : "The Maya Calendar Correlation Problem". In :- R. M. Leventhal & A. L. Kolata (eds.) : Civilization in the Ancient Americas : Essays in Honor of Gordon R. Willey. Santa Fe : University of New Mexico Press; and Cambridge (MA) : Peabody Museum of Archaeology and Ethnology, 1983. pp. 157–208
- Kelley, David H. : "The Lords of Palenque and the Lords of Heaven". In :- M. G. Robertson & Virginia M. Fields (eds.) : Fifth Palenque Round Table, 1983. San Francisco : Pre-Columbian Art Research Institute, 1985. pp. 235–240
- Kelley, David H. : "Mesoamerican Astronomy and the Maya Calendar Correlation Problem". In :- Memorias de Segundo Coloquio Internacional de Mayanistas. Universidad National Autónoma de México, 1989. pp. 65–96
- Kelley, David H. : "Tane and Sina : a Uto-Aztecan Astronomical Cult in Polynesia". In :- Bruno Illius & Matthias Laubscher : Circumpacifica : Festschrift für Thomas S. Barthel. Frankfort am Main : Verlag Peter Lang, 1990. vol. II, pp. 137–155
- Exploring Ancient Skies: An Encyclopedic Survey of Archaeoastronomy by David H. Kelley (Author), Eugene F. Milone (Author), Springer, 2005
