= Fishhook (disambiguation) =

A fishhook is a device for catching fish. Fishhook or fish hook may also refer to:

== Geography ==
Antarctica:

- Fishhook Ridge, a ridge on the east side of Sobral Peninsula

Cambodia:

- Fishhook (Cambodia), a salient of Kampong Cham Province that protrudes into Vietnam

United States:

- Fishhook, Alaska, a census-designated place (CDP) in Matanuska-Susitna Borough
- Fishhook, Illinois, an unincorporated town in Pike County
- Fishhook Lake, a lake in Minnesota
- Fish Hook River, a tributary of the Shell River in Minnesota
- Fishhooks Wilderness, a wilderness area in Arizona

== Botany ==
- Fishhook cactus, a name for any hook-spined species of the genus Mammillaria
- Fishhook barrel cactus (Ferocactus wislizeni), a hook-spined cylindrical cactus
- Fishhook waterflea (Cercopagis pengoi), a species of planktonic crustacean

== Other uses ==
- Fish-hooking, a martial-arts technique
- Fish Hooks, an American animated television series
- Strict conditional, a mathematical conditional marked with the logic symbol ⥽
- Fishhook R, the informal name of the symbol for the alveolar tap in the International Phonetic Alphabet
- Jack (playing card), in poker
- Lari (fish hook money), objects serving as coins in areas around the Arabian Sea
- Samuel "Fish Hook" Mulford, a colonial New York legislator and merchant
- A common opening move in the game of Othello (game)
