= Mark H. Dunkelman =

American historian (born 1947)

- Born: October 29, 1947 (age 78); Buffalo, New York, U.S.
- Education: Rhode Island School of Design (BFA)
- Occupations: Historian; artist; musician

Mark H. Dunkelman (born October 29, 1947) is an American historian, artist, and musician. Dunkelman lives in Providence, Rhode Island.

== Painting ==
Dunkelman was born on October 29, 1947, in Buffalo, New York. As a child, he was inspired by stories from his great-grandfather, Corporal John Langhans, a veteran of the 154th New York Volunteer Infantry. Dunkelman received a BFA in 1969 from the Rhode Island School of Design. In 1976, he was commissioned to paint a historical mural for the town hall in Narragansett, Rhode Island. From 1977 to 1979, he completed a series of 100 American Civil War paintings. Dunkelman designed an 80-foot-long mural at Coster Avenue in Gettysburg, Pennsylvania. He painted the mural, which was installed in 1988, with Rhode Island artist Johan Bjurman.

== Civil War research ==
Dunkelman's American Civil War research focuses on the 154th New York Volunteer Infantry, known as the "Hardtack Regiment". He has contacted over 1,200 descendants of members of the 154th, locating and copying over 1,700 wartime letters, 250 portraits, 25 diaries, dozens of relics, and several other memoirs and accounts. In 2015, a collection of Dunkelman and fellow historian Michael J Winey's research was unveiled at St. Bonaventure University in Allegany, New York.

Since 1986, Dunkelman has organized annual reunions in Cattaraugus and Chautauqua Counties for the descendants of members of the regiment. During the tenth annual reunion, held in 1996, attendees raised funds to erect a monument to their ancestors at Chancellorsville, Virginia.

== Other ==
Dunkelman is also a musician who plays pedal steel guitar and dobro.

== Books by Mark H. Dunkelman ==
- The Hardtack Regiment: An Illustrated History of the 154th Regiment, New York State Infantry Volunteers (East Brunswick, N.J.: Fairleigh Dickinson University Press, 1981). Michael J. Winey, coauthor.
- For Generations of Miracles: A History of Providence Lying-In and Women and Infants Hospital of Rhode Island (East Greenwich, R.I.: Meridian Printing, 1996).
- Gettysburg's Unknown Soldier: The Life, Death, and Celebrity of Amos Humiston (Westport, Conn.: Praeger, 1999).
- Brothers One and All: Esprit de Corps in a Civil War Regiment (Baton Rouge: Louisiana State University Press, 2004).
- War’s Relentless Hand: Twelve Tales of Civil War Soldiers (Baton Rouge: Louisiana State University Press, 2006).
- Marching with Sherman: Through Georgia and the Carolinas with the 154th New York (Baton Rouge: Louisiana State University Press, 2012).
- Patrick Henry Jones: Irish American, Civil War General, and Gilded Age Politician (Baton Rouge: Louisiana State University Press, 2015).
