= Joseph W. Latimer =

Confederate Army officer in the American Civil War (1843-1863)

Joseph White Latimer
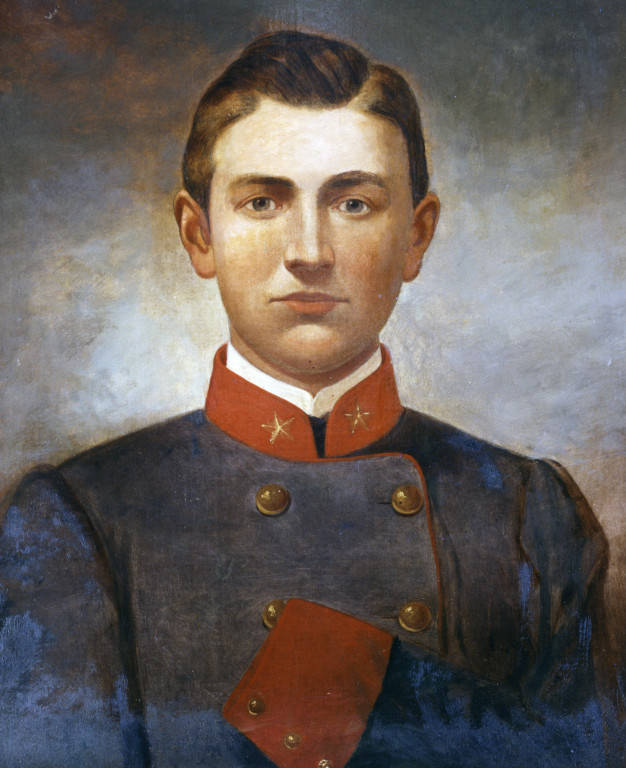
- Joseph White Latimer
- Born: August 27, 1843; Oak Ridge, Prince William County, Virginia
- Died: August 1, 1863 (aged 19); Harrisonburg, Rockingham County, Virginia
- Burial place: Woodbine Cemetery, Harrisonburg, Rockingham County, Virginia
- Military career
- Allegiance: Confederate States of America
- Branch: Confederate States Army
- Service years: 1861–63
- Rank: Major
- Conflicts: American Civil War

Joseph White Latimer (August 27, 1843 – August 1, 1863), "The Boy Major", was a promising young officer in the Confederate Army of Northern Virginia's artillery branch during the American Civil War. He was mortally wounded at the Battle of Gettysburg and died four weeks later.

== Early life ==
Latimer was born in Oak Ridge, Prince William County, Virginia. He was educated at the Virginia Military Institute (VMI) and studied artillery tactics under Stonewall Jackson.

== Civil War ==
During Latimer's second year of studies, the Civil War broke out and Latimer left VMI to serve the Southern Confederacy. He first served as cadet drillmaster for the Richmond Hampden Artillery during the spring and summer of 1861. In the fall, he was commissioned as a first lieutenant and saw action with Maj. Gen. Richard S. Ewell's division in the Shenandoah Valley Campaign of 1862. After distinguishing himself with his battery at such battles as First Winchester and Cedar Mountain, Latimer was promoted to command of the battalion that had previously belonged to A. R. Courtney. After commanding the battalion at Fredericksburg in December 1862, Latimer was promoted to major in March 1863. Ewell referred to him as the "Young Napoleon", but his contemporaries noted his youth and small, slight stature by calling him the "Boy Major." He became an officer in Maj. Richard Snowden Andrews's Battalion of Maj. Gen. Edward "Allegheny" Johnson's Division.

== Gettysburg Campaign ==
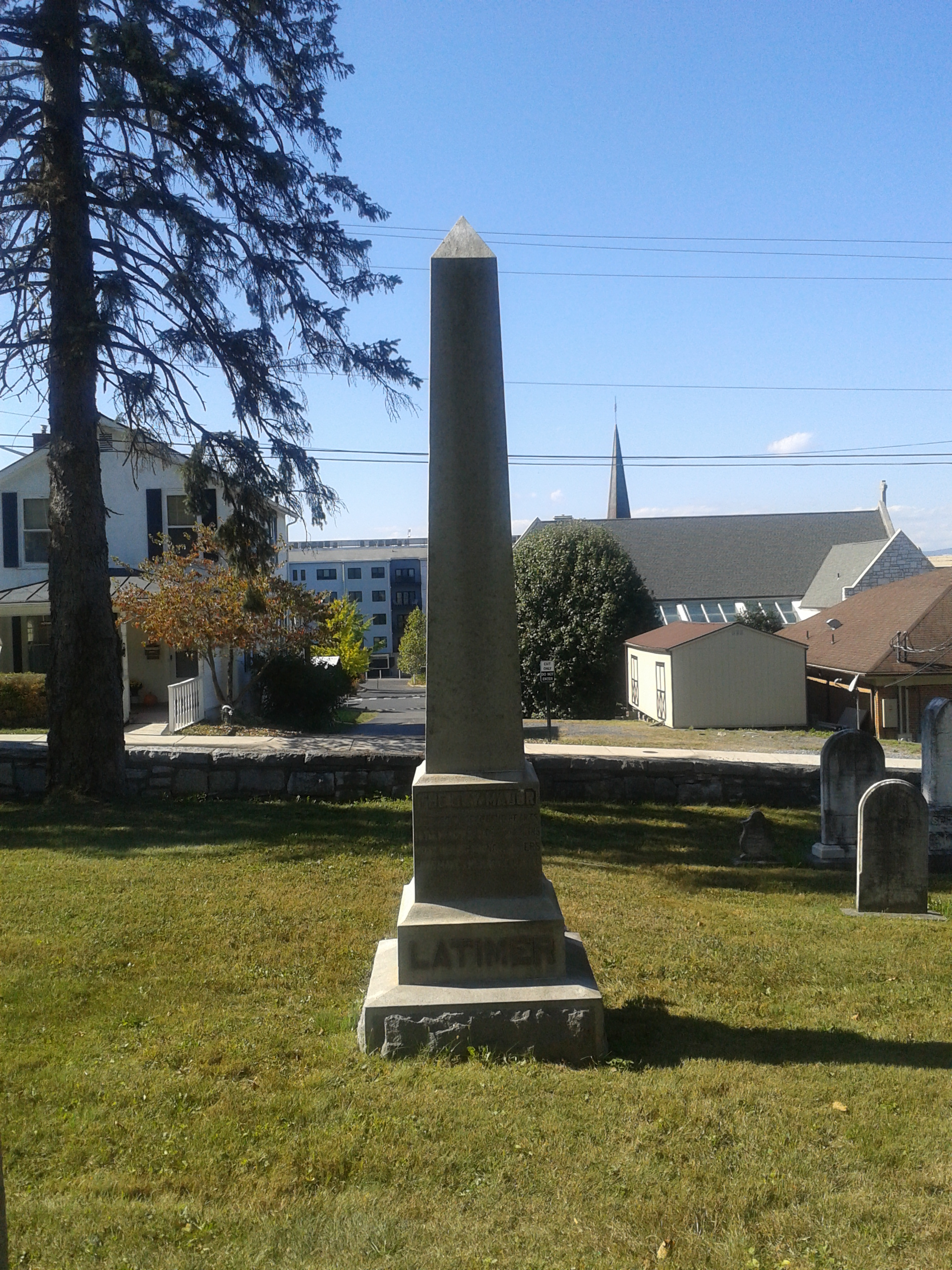
Latimer's grave in Woodbine Cemetery

When Andrews was wounded at the Battle of Stephenson's Depot, Latimer took command of the artillery battalion for the Gettysburg campaign. During the Battle of Gettysburg, on the afternoon of July 2, 1863, Latimer was commanding the artillery battalion, which was located on Benner's Hill, a small rise located about 1,400 yards northeast of Cemetery Hill. The Confederate guns engaged in a duel with their Federal counterparts while attempting to support the attack on Culp's and Cemetery Hills. The position on Benner's Hill was open and exposed, and the Confederate guns found themselves at a severe disadvantage. Latimer requested that he be allowed to move the guns to a more favorable position. "Such an admission by so stubborn a fighter did not have to be verified," as historian Douglas Southall Freeman put it, and Latimer was allowed to begin withdrawing the guns. He was wounded after he returned to the hill to direct the fire of his remaining four guns. An exploding shell severely wounded his arm and killed his horse, which fell on him and pinned him to the ground. Division commander Allegheny Johnson noted in his official battle report that, "Major J.W. Latimer, of Andrews' battalion, the "boy major," whose chivalrous bearing on so many fields had won for him a reputation to be envied by his seniors, received a severe wound on the evening of the 2d, from the effects of which he has since died." Cpt Charles I. Raine took charge of the battalion after Latimer was wounded.

Latimer's left arm had to be amputated. The amputation was performed at the Daniel Lady Farm, which is today preserved by the Gettysburg Battlefield Preservation Association. Initially hospitalized in Winchester, movements by the Federal troops required that Latimer be transported somewhere safer. He was moved to Harrisonburg, Virginia, to the home of the E. T. H. Warren family. The constant movement—first from Gettysburg, then from Winchester—did not aid his recovery, and soon after he was transported to Harrisonburg, gangrene appeared. From that point on, Latimer rapidly worsened and he died on August 1, 1863. He was buried in the Woodbine Cemetery at Harrisonburg. The grave of the "Boy Major" is marked by a monument placed 51 years after his death by the Ladies Memorial Association and the United Daughters of the Confederacy.
