= Fishhook Lake =

Lake in the state of Minnesota, United States

Fish Hook Lake
- Location within Minnesota
- Location: Hubbard County, Minnesota
- Coordinates: 46°57′25″N 95°3′51″W
- Type: lake

Fish Hook Lake is a lake in Hubbard County, in the U.S. state of Minnesota.

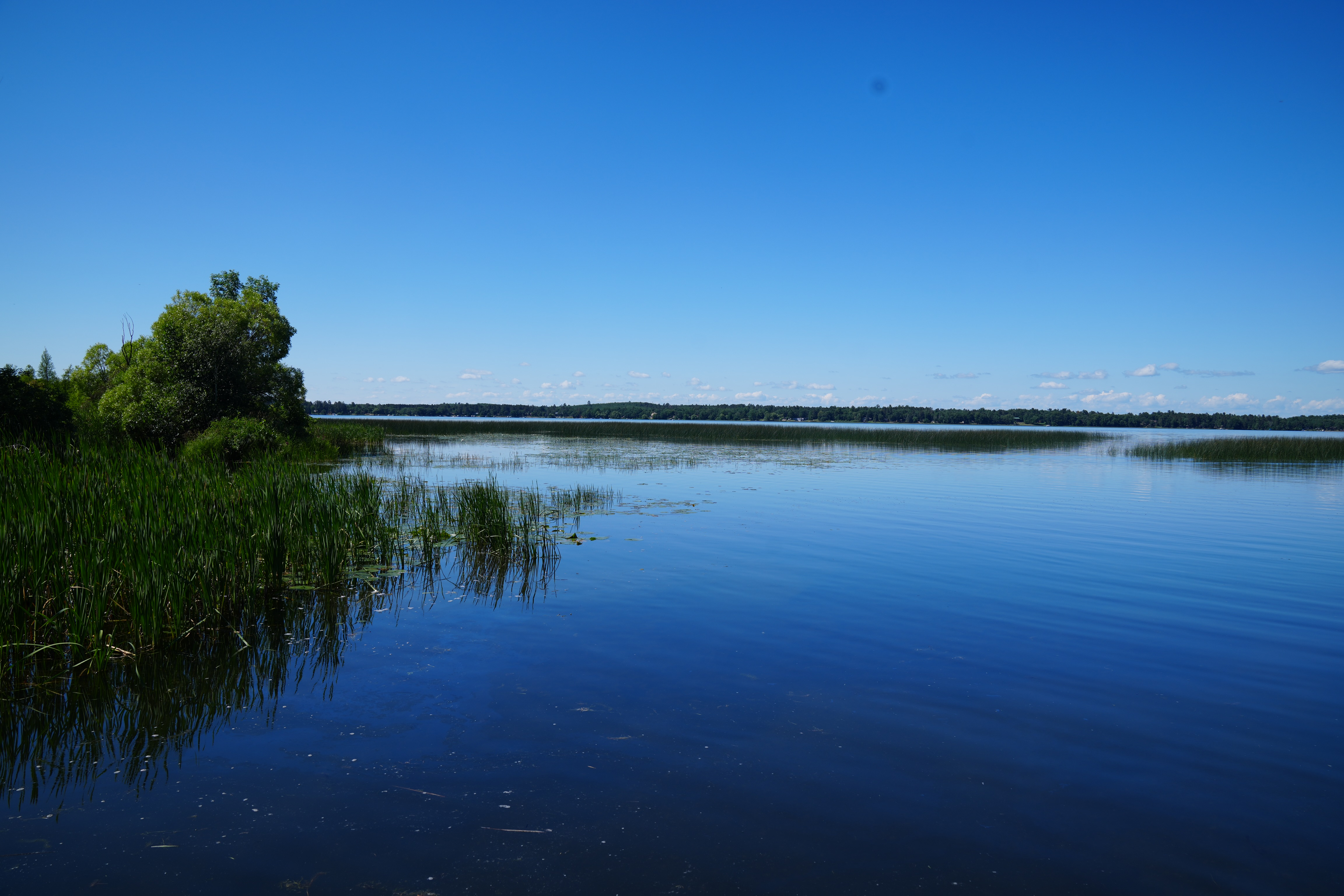
Fishhook Lake, Hubbard County, Minnesota

Fish Hook Lake is the English translation of the native Ojibwe language name.

== See also ==
- List of lakes in Minnesota
