= National Homestead at Gettysburg =

Former Orphanage at Gettysburg

Coordinates: 39.82228°N 77.23092°W

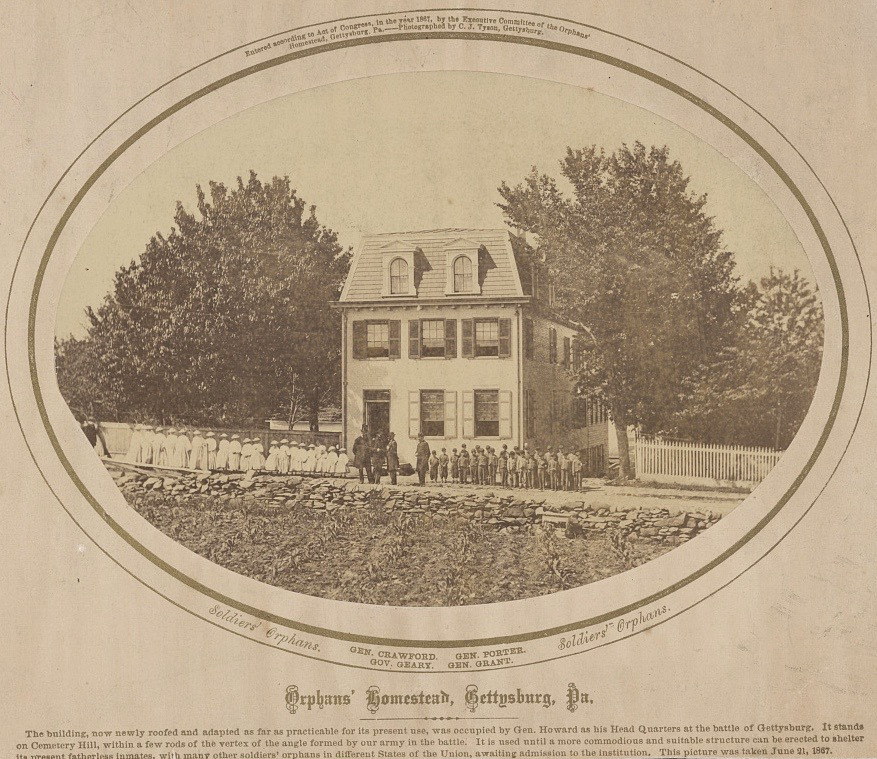
Ulysses S. Grant with the boys and girls at National Homestead orphanage, June 21, 1867

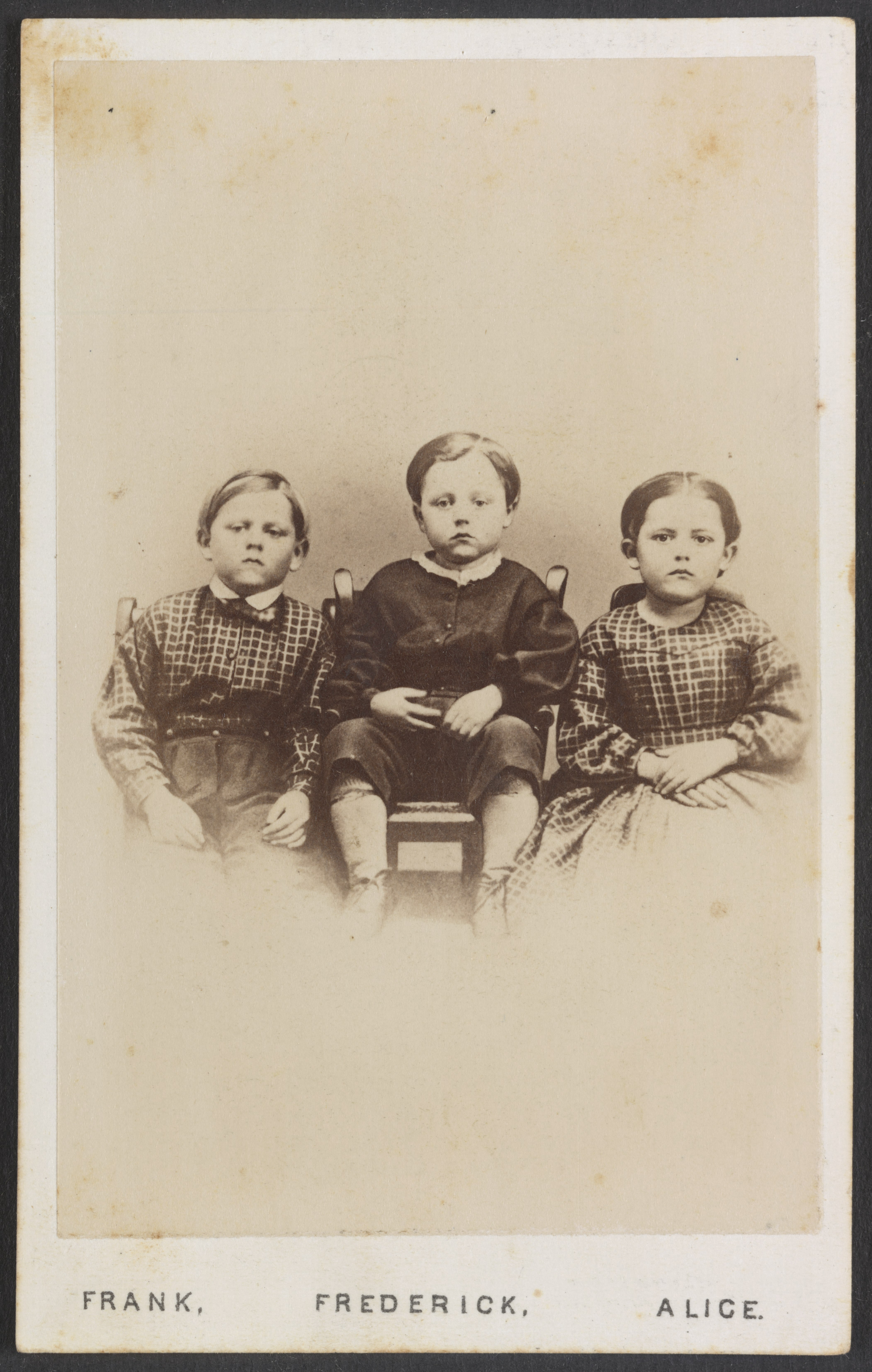
Portrait of Frank, Frederick, and Alice Humiston, children of Sergeant Amos Humiston of Co. C, 154th New York Infantry Regiment, who died at the Battle of Gettysburg with the photograph in his hands.

The National Homestead at Gettysburg (located at 777 Baltimore Street) was the Gettysburg Orphanage, and a widows home, which opened in October 1866 (incorporated March 22, 1867) on the Gettysburg Battlefield along Baltimore Street on the north foot of Cemetery Hill.

== History ==
The facility was created by Dr. John F. Bourns after fundraising resulting from the identification of a Battle of Gettysburg casualty's children as Amos Humiston's. In 1867, Ulysses S. Grant was photographed with orphans at the entrance, and an 1870 Pennsylvania bill was used to fund the facility.

The beginning history of the homestead was prosperous, but after the initial head mistress was replaced by Rosa J. Carmichael, the history of the orphanage took a turn for the worse. Carmichael was a cruel disciplinarian who created a dungeon for disciplining children. This dungeon, along with the stories that accompany it have made the homestead notorious.

Eventually, the orphanage was turned into the Soldiers National Museum that was once owned by actor Cliff Arquette, who narrated tours of the building, especially the dungeon. However, the museum has been closed to the public since November 2014.

== Hauntings ==
The homestead also became a popular spot for paranormal investigators to go ghost hunting. In 2011, the Ghost Adventures crew spent the night in the basement during their lockdown, trying to communicate with Carmichael's ghost. It was also featured as a haunted location on the paranormal TV series, Most Terrifying Places which aired on the Travel Channel in 2019. Sam and Colby also released an investigation on the orphanage on August 12, 2024. Haunted Nights, YouTubers Steve Brodt and Dylan Stevens, also investigated here. Their video was published on June 6, 2023. Along with Project Fear where the brother and sister duo, Chelsea and Dakota, and their two friends, Tanner and Alex, explore this haunted place for the first time. Their video was posted November 7, 2025.
