= Raleigh E. Colston =

American general (1825–1896)

Raleigh Edward Colston
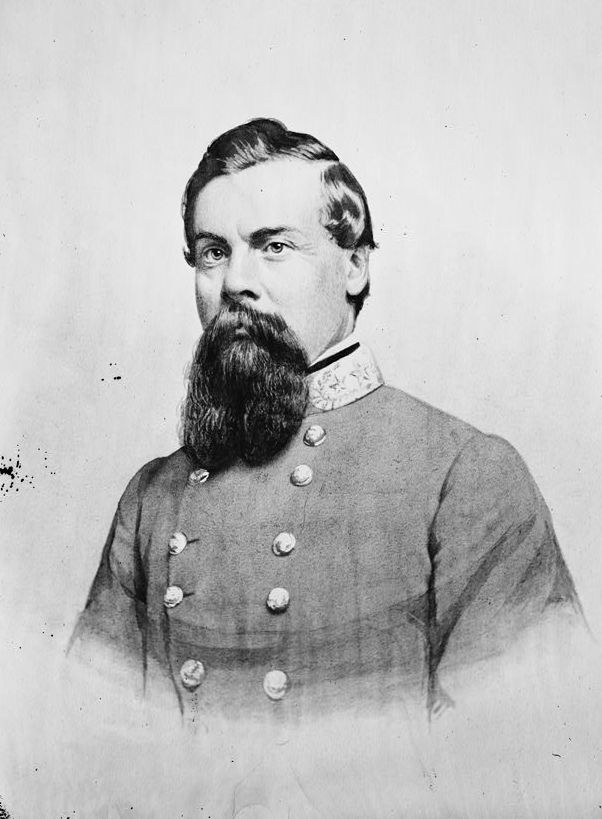
- Born: October 1, 1825; Paris, France
- Died: July 29, 1896 (aged 70); Richmond, Virginia
- Burial place: Hollywood Cemetery (Richmond, Virginia)
- Military career
- Allegiance: Confederate States; Khedivate of Egypt
- Branch: Confederate States Army; Egyptian Army
- Service years: 1861–1865 (CSA)
- Rank: Brigadier General (CSA); Colonel (Egypt)
- Conflicts: American Civil War

Raleigh Edward Colston (October 1, 1825 – July 29, 1896) was a French-born American professor, soldier, cartographer, and writer. He was a controversial brigadier general in the Confederate States Army during the American Civil War. Colston was among a handful of former Confederates who served in Egypt following the war.

== Early life and career ==
Born in Paris, France, Colston was the adopted son of Maria Theresa, 2nd Duchess of Valmy (c. 1775-1845) and Dr. Raleigh Edward Colston (1796–1881). His mother had divorced her husband François Étienne de Kellermann, who was a famous cavalry general under Napoleon Bonaparte. Both his and his father's names honor Revolutionary war lawyer and merchant Rawleigh Colston (1749-1823) who traded in the West Indies for military supplies for the Continental Army, corresponded with George Washington, married into the Marshall family of Virginia and bought part of the Northern Neck Propriety, which after litigation led to the family's establishment in western Virginia. Dr. Colston's marriage to a Catholic and a divorcee scandalized the Colston family of Virginia. In 1842, young Colston was sent to study in the United States, living with an uncle in Berkeley County, Virginia, now West Virginia. His "rigidly pious" uncle repeatedly tried to get Colston to enter the Presbyterian ministry, but the young man preferred a military career.

Colston entered the Virginia Military Institute in 1843 and graduated July 4, 1846, fourth in a class of fourteen. Following his graduation, he taught French and military science at VMI. He married Louise Meriwether Bowyer; the couple had two daughters, Mary Frances and Louise Elizabeth. Professor Colston and a group of VMI cadets served as guards during the November 1859 execution of abolitionist firebrand John Brown following his unsuccessful raid on Harper's Ferry.

== Civil War ==
With Virginia's secession in early 1861, Colston was commissioned as the colonel of the 16th Virginia Infantry. Colston commanded the Confederate district across from Newport News during the historic 1862 battle between the USS Monitor and CSS Virginia.

On December 24, 1861, Colston was appointed as a brigadier general. He served under James Longstreet in the Peninsula Campaign in mid-1862, leading three regiments. His performance at the Battle of Seven Pines elicited criticism. Becoming ill from exposure, Colston left the Army of Northern Virginia until December 1862.

In April 1863, he led a brigade under Stonewall Jackson. Because he knew Colston from the time when both were professors at VMI, Jackson recommended Colston to lead a division. At the Battle of Chancellorsville on May 2, Colston led one of the divisions involved in Jackson's flank attack on the Union army's right flank. His division was placed in the second line on May 3. In the two days fighting, his division lost 31% casualties. However, on May 3, "Raleigh Colston, the least experienced of Lee's generals of division, proved painfully slow in directing his men into action." Lee relieved Colston of command of the division on May 20. In November 1863, his cousin Raleigh T. Colston, an 1850 VMI graduate who had become colonel of the 2nd Virginia Infantry (also part of the Stonewall Brigade), became one of the few fatalities of the Battle of Mine Run.

R. E. Colston served under P.G.T. Beauregard in 1864 in the Siege of Petersburg. In early 1865, he was in command of the defense of Lynchburg, Virginia, guarding one of the Confederacy's last open railroads.

== Postbellum career ==
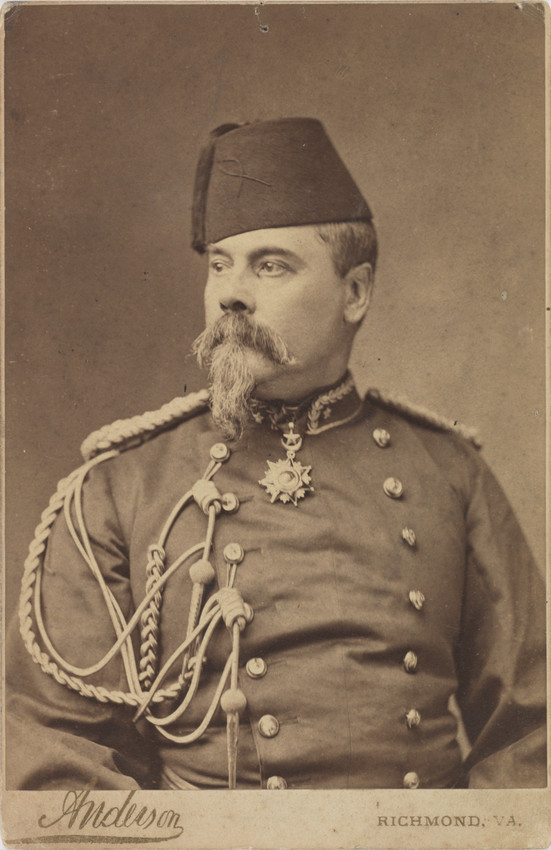
Colston in his Egyptian Army uniform

Colston established a pair of military schools, including one in Wilmington, North Carolina. The first school failed and the second proved only a modest success. At this time, his wife suffered a mental breakdown and was confined to an asylum.

In May 1873, Colston arrived in Egypt having been hired by the Khedive of Egypt, Isma'il Pasha, as a professor of geology and a colonel in the military. Colston, "a gentleman and slow to believe evil about his fellow man" got along well with most of the other American expatriates serving the khedive, such as his superiors Charles Pomeroy Stone and William W. Loring. Unlike some of his fellow Americans who got into debt, he lived frugally and sent home funds to take care of his wife.

The Khedive sent Colston to lead a small expedition to discover a route for a railroad linking the Red Sea with the Nile River. On September 27, he set off camel-back southeast from Qena on the Nile toward the ancient port of Berenice on the Red Sea. After joining another American-led party at Berenice and surveying the harbor, they set off for Berber, Sudan in January 1874, reaching there in March. From there, they descended the Nile to Cairo, reporting to the Khedive in May.

In December 1874, Colston set out at the head of a second expedition, this time to Kurdufan. He fell ill in March, but unlike his American second-in-command who returned to Cairo, Colston determined to press on due to his "soldier's pride." Soon he was unable to ride a camel and had to be carried across the desert for several weeks on a litter, during which time he expected to die and, as a result, wrote his will. Yet, he only turned over command when another American arrived. He was partially paralyzed for nearly a year and suffered lifelong lingering aftereffects. Colston finally recovered after spending six months at a Catholic mission in El Obeid. The ex-Confederate attributed his survival to a "black angel," the wife of one of his Sudanese soldiers whom he once granted a favor. During his period of sickness, the woman nursed Colston back to health. He only returned to Cairo in the spring of 1876.

In 1879, he returned to the United States, where he lectured and wrote several magazine articles on his experiences in North Africa and in the Civil War. Despite being crippled, he worked as a clerk and translator in the U.S. War Department and Surgeon General's office from 1882 to 1894.

He lived the rest of his life as an invalid in the Confederate Soldiers' Home in Richmond, Virginia, where he died penniless. He was buried in Hollywood Cemetery in Richmond, not far from fellow Virginia general George Pickett.

== In popular media ==
Actor J. Scott Watkins portrayed General Colston in the 2003 Civil War film Gods and Generals.

== See also ==
- List of American Civil War generals (Confederate)
