= Laura Brown =

Laura Brown may refer to:

- Laura Blindkilde Brown (born 2003), English professional footballer
- Laura Brown (fashion journalist) (born 1974), Australian fashion journalist
- Laura Brown (cyclist) (born 1986), Canadian cyclist
- Laura Brown (chemist), American chemist
- Laura Brown (golfer) (born 1970), American golfer
- Laura A. Brown (1874–1924), American activist and local politician in Pennsylvania
