= Jack Skelly =

American Union Army soldier (1841-1863)

Johnston Hastings Skelly Jr.
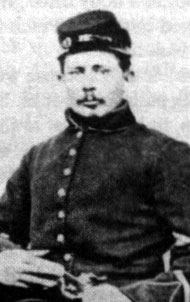
- Born: August 4, 1841; Gettysburg, Pennsylvania
- Died: July 12, 1863 (aged 21); Winchester, Virginia
- Burial place: Evergreen Cemetery, Gettysburg, Pennsylvania
- Military career
- Allegiance: United States of America
- Branch: Union Army
- Service years: 1861–1863
- Rank: Corporal
- Nickname: Jack
- Unit: 87th Pennsylvania Infantry

Johnston Hastings "Jack" Skelly Jr. (August 4, 1841 – July 12, 1863) was a Union soldier – a corporal in the 87th Pennsylvania Infantry – who died as a result of wounds sustained at the Second Battle of Winchester. He was the friend, and possibly fiancé, of Jennie Wade, the only civilian to die in the Battle of Gettysburg. He was buried in Evergreen Cemetery in Gettysburg, Pennsylvania, near Wade's grave.

== Biography ==
Skelly was born to parents Elizabeth and Johnston Skelly Sr. in Gettysburg. He joined the Union Army, made the rank of corporal, and he and his brother Charles joined Company F of the 87th Pennsylvania Infantry, along with childhood friends William T. Ziegler and William Hotzworth. During the Battle of Carter's Woods near Winchester, Virginia, Jack, his brother, and their two friends were captured by enemy soldiers. After they were called upon to surrender, they attempted to flee, and Skelly was shot in the upper arm on June 15, 1863. He died a month later. The Grand Army of the Republic post in Gettysburg was named after Skelly.

=== Book ===
The book My Country Needs Me: the story of Johnston Hastings Skelly Jr., by Enrica D’Alessandro, includes five previously unpublished letters from Jennie Wade to Jack Skelly and is the first book about their relationship.

== Notes ==
- Bellamy, Jay. "Brother vs. Brother, Friend against Friend: A Story of Family, Friendship, Love, and War" (PDF). Prologue (Spring, 2013): 20.
- Petruzzi, J. David, and Steven Stanley, The Complete Gettysburg Guide, Savas Beatie, 2009, ISBN 978-1-932714-63-0.
