= Freedom Transit =

Freedom Transit can refer to:

- Freedom Transit (Adams County, Pennsylvania)
- Freedom Transit (Washington County, Pennsylvania)
