= Daniel P. Reigle =

Union Army Soldier during the American Civil War

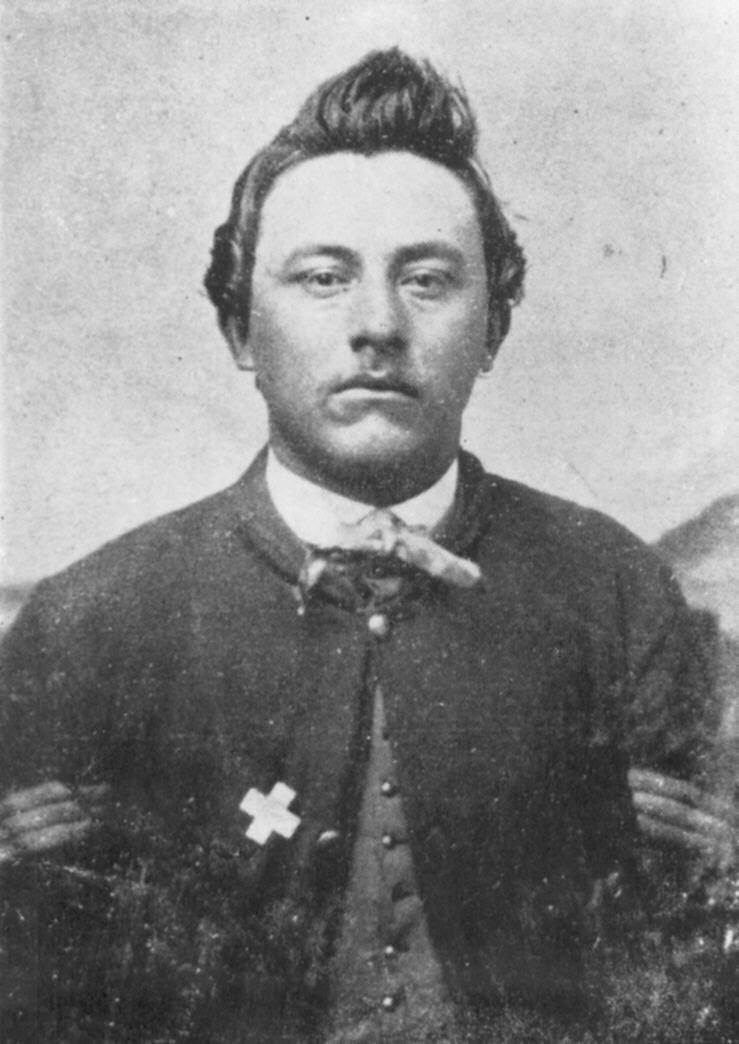
- Born: February 19, 1841; Mount Joy Township, Adams County, Pennsylvania
- Died: March 19, 1917 (aged 76); Gettysburg, Pennsylvania
- Burial place: Mount Carmel Cemetery, Littlestown, Pennsylvania
- Military career
- Allegiance: United States
- Branch: United States Army; Union Army
- Service years: 1861–1865
- Rank: Sergeant
- Units: Company F, 87th Pennsylvania Infantry
- Conflicts: American Civil War • Battle of Cedar Creek
- Awards: Medal of Honor

Daniel Peter Reigle (February 19, 1841 – March 19, 1917) was a Union Army soldier during the American Civil War. He received the Medal of Honor for gallantry during the Battle of Cedar Creek fought near Middletown, Virginia on October 19, 1864. The battle was the decisive engagement of Major General Philip Sheridan's Valley Campaigns of 1864 and was the largest battle fought in the Shenandoah Valley.

== Life and career ==
Reigle was born on February 19, 1841 in Mount Joy Township, Adams County, Pennsylvania to Samuel and Rachel Reigle (née Smeach). When Reigle was about four years old, his mother died, possibly as a result of complications during childbirth of his younger sister. In September 1861, at the age of 21, Reigle enrolled in Company F of the 87th Pennsylvania Infantry Regiment. He was mustered in at the rank of sergeant. During the Battle of Cedar Creek on October 19, 1864, Reigle "[rushed] forward through a terrific fire and [captured] a rebel flag at the stone fence where the enemy's last stand was made." For this, he was awarded the Medal of Honor. Reigle was mustered out in June 1865.

After the war, Reigle married and had five children. He became a farmer thereafter and died in 1917 at Gettysburg, Pennsylvania after a stroke. He is buried at Mt. Carmel Cemetery in Littlestown, Pennsylvania, and is also honored at the Pennsylvania Medal of Honor Memorial in Harrisburg.

Daniel Reigle is one of many members of the Reigle (spelling varies) family to have fought in the American Civil War.

== See also ==
- List of Medal of Honor recipients
- List of American Civil War Medal of Honor recipients: Q–S
