= 87th Pennsylvania Infantry Regiment =

Union Army infantry regiment

87th Pennsylvania Volunteer Infantry
- Active: September 1861 to June 29, 1865
- Country: United States
- Allegiance: Union
- Branch: Infantry
- Engagements: Second Battle of Winchester; Bristoe Campaign; Mine Run Campaign; Battle of the Wilderness; Battle of Spotsylvania Court House; Battle of Totopotomoy Creek; Battle of Cold Harbor; Battle of Monocacy; Shenandoah Valley Campaign; Third Battle of Winchester; Battle of Cedar Creek; Siege of Petersburg; Appomattox Campaign

The 87th Pennsylvania Volunteer Infantry was an infantry regiment that served in the Union Army during the American Civil War.

== Service ==
The 87th Pennsylvania Infantry was organized at York, Pennsylvania and mustered in for a three-year enlistment in September 1861 under the command of Colonel George Hay.

The regiment was attached to Railroad Guard, Middle Department, to May 1862. Baltimore, Maryland, Middle Department, to June 1862. Railroad Division, VIII Corps, Middle Department, to March 1863. 2nd Brigade, 2nd Division, VIII Corps, Middle Department, to June 1863. 1st Brigade, Elliott's Command, VIII Corps, to July 1863. 3rd Brigade, 3rd Division, III Corps, Army of the Potomac, to March 1864. 1st Brigade, 3rd Division, VI Corps, Army of the Potomac and Army of the Shenandoah, to June 1865.

The 87th Pennsylvania Infantry mustered out of service at Alexandria, Virginia, on June 29, 1865.

== Detailed service ==
Guard duty on Northern Central Railroad from Pennsylvania line to Baltimore, Md., September 16, 1861, to May 24, 1862. Duty at Baltimore, Md., until June 23. At New Creek, W. Va., until August 20. Expedition under Gen. Kelly across Laurel Hill and Rich Mountain August 27-September 12. Expedition over Cheat and Allegheny Mountains October 31-November 12. March on Petersburg, W. Va., December 6–9. At Winchester until May 1863. Reconnaissance toward Wardensville and Strasburg April 20. Expedition to Webster May 20. At Winchester until June 15. Reconnaissance toward Strasburg June 10. Middletown June 12. Newtown June 12. Bunker Hill June 13 (Companies G & H). Battles of Winchester June 13–15. Retreat to Harper's Ferry. Escort stores from Harper's Ferry to Washington, D.C., July 1–3. Joined Army of the Potomac and pursuit of Lee July 5–24. Wapping Heights, Manassas Gap, Va., July 23. Bristoe Campaign October 9–22. Advance to line of the Rappahannock November 7–8. Kelly's Ford November 7. Brandy Station November 8. Mine Run Campaign November 26-December 2. Payne's Farm November 27. Reenlisted December 1863. Demonstration on the Rapidan February 6–7, 1864. Rapidan Campaign May 4-June 12, 1864. Battles of the Wilderness May 5–7; Spottsylvania C. H. May 8–21. Assault on the Salient May 12. North Anna River May 23–26. Line of the Pamunkey May 26–28. Totopotomoy May 28–31. Cold Harbor June 1–12. Before Petersburg June 17–18. Siege of Petersburg until July 6. Weldon Railroad June 22–23. Moved to Baltimore, Md., July 6–9. Battle of Monocacy Junction July 9. Sheridan's Shenandoah Valley Campaign August 7-December 1. Charlestown August 21–22. Battle of Opequan, Winchester, September 19. Fisher's Hill September 22. (Old members mustered out October 13, 1864.) Battle of Cedar Creek. Duty at Kernstown until December. Moved to Washington, D.C., thence to Petersburg, Va., December 3–7. Siege of Petersburg December 1864 to April 1865. Fort Fisher, Petersburg, March 25, 1865. Appomattox Campaign March 28-April 9. Assault on and fall of Petersburg April 2. Pursuit of Lee April 3–9. Appomattox C. H. April 9. Surrender of Lee and his army. March to Danville April 23–27, and duty there until May 23. March to Richmond, Va., thence to Washington, D.C., May 23-June 3. Corps Review June 8.

== Casualties ==
The regiment lost a total of 202 men during service; 10 officers and 80 enlisted men killed or mortally wounded, 112 enlisted men died from disease-related causes.

== Commanders ==
- Colonel George Hay
- Colonel John William Schall
- Colonel James Tearney
- Lieutenant Colonel James Alonzo Stahle - commanded at the Battle of Monocacy
- Captain Edgar M. Ruhl - commanded at the Battle of Cedar Creek; killed in action
- Captain John A. Salsbury - commanded at the Battle of Cedar Creek, succeeding Captain Ruhl

== Notable members ==
- Corporal Daniel Peter Reigle, Company F - Medal of Honor recipient for action at the battle of Cedar Creek, October 19, 1864; subsequently promoted to sergeant
- Corporal Johnston Hastings Skelley, Jr., Company F - alleged fiancé of Mary Virginia "Ginnie" Wade the only civilian killed at Gettysburg; Skelly was mortally wounded at the second battle of Winchester on the morning of June 15, 1863, at Carter's Woods
- Corporal William T. Ziegler, Company F – member of the Pennsylvania House of Representatives

== See also ==
- List of Pennsylvania Civil War Units
- Pennsylvania in the Civil War
