= William Ziegler =

William or Willi Ziegler may refer to:

- William T. Ziegler (1840–1916), American politician from Pennsylvania
- William Ziegler (industrialist) (1843–1905), American industrialist
- William Ziegler Jr. (1891–1958), adopted son
- William Ziegler (film editor) (1909–1977), American film editor
- William Ziegler III (ca 1929–2008), owner of Swisher International Group and son of Ziegler Jr.
- Willi Ziegler (1929–2002), German paleontologist

== See also ==
- William Ziegler House, mansion of Ziegler Jr.
- William and Helen Ziegler House, second mansion of Ziegler Jr.
