= Harpster =

Harpster may refer to:

- Harpster (surname)
- Harpster, Idaho
- Harpster, Ohio
