= James Gettys =

James Gettys may refer to:

- James Gettys (founder of Gettysburg) (1759–1815), founder of Gettysburg, Pennsylvania
- Jim Gettys (born 1953), American computer programmer
