= Samuel Gettys =

Founder of Gettysburg, Pennsylvania

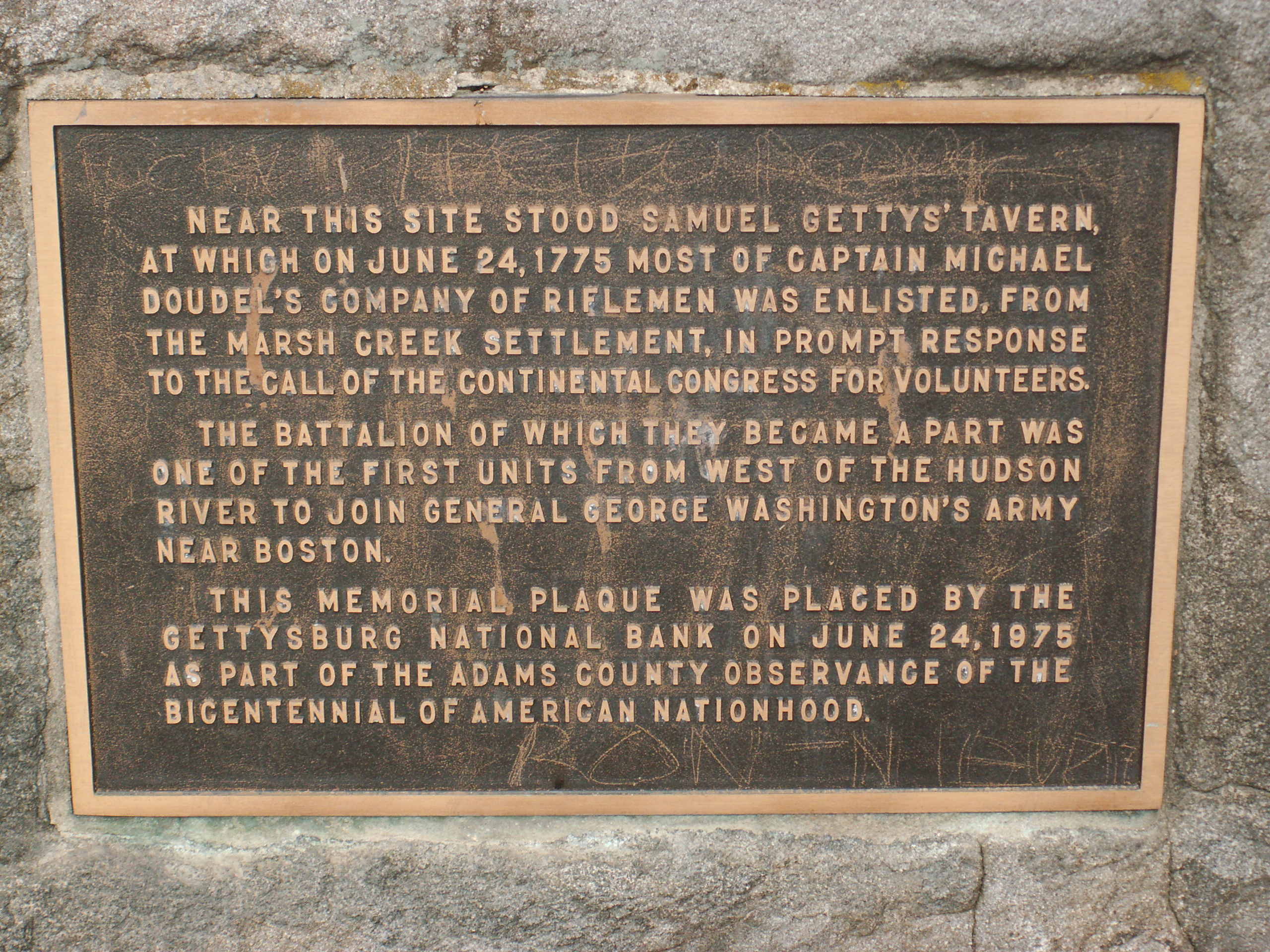
Historical Marker

Samuel Gettys (1725 – March 15, 1790) was a settler and tavern owner in south-central Pennsylvania during the late 1780s. The borough of Gettysburg, Pennsylvania, which was founded in 1786, was named after him.

== Formative years ==
Born in 1725 in Randalstown, County Antrim, Ireland, Samuel Gettys was the husband of Isabella (Ramsey) Gettys (1731–1815), the sister of Reynolds Ramsey, grandfather of historian J. G. M. Ramsey. Their children were: Mary (Gettys) Linn (1752–1823), William Gettys (1757–1813), and James Gettys (1759–1815).

== American Revolution ==
Samuel Gettys gave funds to the Continental Army during the American Revolutionary War, but, soon after it won, he was rich in land but poor in cash; so he decided to sell off his plots of land in order to achieve financial stability. In 1786, his son James bought his land and sold it off in 210 parcel lots, and is thus considered the founder of Gettysburg.

== Death and interment ==
Gettys died in Gettysburg on March 15, 1790, and was buried at Black's Graveyard in that city.
