= Harpster (surname) =

Harpster is a surname. Notable people with the surname include:

- Howard Harpster (1907–1980), American football player and coach
- Julia Jacobs Harpster (1846–1935), American missionary
- Noah Harpster (born 1976), American actor, writer, producer, and director
