= Edgar M. Ruhl =

- Born: Edgar Monroe Ruhl; May 26, 1841; Shrewsbury, Pennsylvania
- Died: October 19, 1864 (aged 23); Cedar Creek, Virginia
- Burial place: Christ Evangelical Lutheran Cemetery, Shrewsbury, Pennsylvania
- Military career
- Allegiance: United States of America; Union
- Branch: United States Army; Union Army
- Service years: 1861–64
- Rank: Captain
- Unit: 87th Pennsylvania Infantry
- Conflicts: American Civil War: Third Battle of Winchester; Battle of Cedar Creek

Edgar M. Ruhl (1841–1864) American soldier, a captain in the American Civil War.

Edgar Monroe Ruhl was born in Shrewsbury, Pennsylvania. Following the separation of his parents, he worked as a cigar maker.

On August 31, 1861, Ruhl enlisted in the 87th Pennsylvania Infantry in Company D, a unit his father commanded. The muster date for the unit is listed as September 19, though this may be the date of his promotion to sergeant from private.

Ruhl was promoted throughout the war, at least in part because of his father's interventions. He was promoted from Sergeant to First Sergeant on May 12, 1862. On October 25, 1862, he was promoted to second lieutenant. He was promoted to first lieutenant on May 10, 1863. His final promotion, to captain, occurred on April 20, 1864.

Following the discharge of members of the 87th whose three-year term of enlistment was up, on September 23, 1864, Ruhl was left in command of 200 members of the 87th who had later discharge dates. He led his troops up the Shenandoah Valley, engaging in the Third Battle of Winchester, the Battle of Fisher's Hill, and finally the Battle of Cedar Creek.

In the evening of October 18 and early morning of October 19th, Ruhl wrote a letter of recommendation to the battalion for Sgt. William Esias Culp to become quartermaster. Early the morning of the 19th, Ruhl was killed when a Minié ball traveled through his body, severing an artery. He is reported to have thrown up his hands and said, "Boys, its all up with me." He died a few minutes later.

On November 1, 1864, Noah Ruhl collected his son's remains and had them removed to Shrewsbury, where they were buried with military honors.

He is the namesake for Pennsylvania's Sons of Union Veterans of the Civil War Camp #33, Edgar M. Ruhl.

== Sources ==
- Brandt, Dennis W. From Home Guards to Heroes:The 87th Pennsylvania and Its Civil War Community. University of Missouri Press, 2006.
- Prowell, George R. History of the 87th Pennsylvania Volunteers. York Daily Press, 1903. Reprinted 1994 by Windmill Publications for Historical Society of York County.
