= Henry Eyster Jacobs =

American religious educator, Biblical commentator and Lutheran theologian

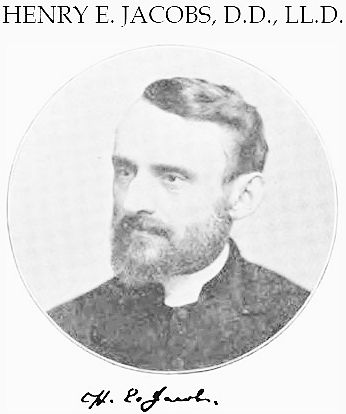
- Born: November 10, 1844; Gettysburg, Pennsylvania
- Died: July 7, 1932 (aged 87); Gettysburg, Pennsylvania
- Education: Pennsylvania College, Lutheran Seminary.
- Spouse: Laura Hewes (nee Downing)

Ecclesiastical career
- Church: Evangelical Lutheran General Synod of the United States of America
- Ordained: 1868
- Offices held: Principal, Thiel Hall, Phillipsburgh (Now Thiel College in Greenville, Pennsylvania,(1868–70).; Chair of Latin, (1870-1880), Pennsylvania College.; Chair of Ancient Languages (1880-1881), Pennsylvania College.; Chair of Greek Language and Literature (1881-1883), Pennsylvania College.; Professor of Systematic Theology, Lutheran Seminary, Mt. Airy, Philadelphia, Pennsylvania (1883-1893).; Vice President, Pennsylvania Bible Society; Dean of Faculty, Lutheran Seminary, Mt. Airy, Philadelphia, Pennsylvania (1893).

Henry Eyster Jacobs (November 10, 1844 – July 7, 1932) was an American religious educator, Biblical commentator and Lutheran theologian.

== Biography ==
Jacobs was born in Gettysburg, Pennsylvania, the son of professor Michael and Juliana M (Eyster) Jacobs. His sister Julia Jacobs Harpster became a missionary in India; his brother Michael William Jacobs became a judge. He graduated from Pennsylvania College in 1862 and from the Lutheran Theological Seminary at Gettysburg in 1865. Between 1870 and 1883, he was professor at Pennsylvania College. He was then appointed professor of systematic theology in The Lutheran Theological Seminary in Mount Airy, where he also assumed the office of dean in 1894. In 1920, he became President of the Seminary when the office of dean was abolished.

He served as president of his church's board of foreign missions (1902–07), of the General Council of Lutherans (1899, 1902, 1904), of the American Society of Church History (1907–08), and of the Pennsylvania German Society (1910–11). He also translated various German theological works and editing the Lutheran Church Review (1882–96), and Lutheran Commentary (1895–98). Henry Eyster Jacobs, working with John A.W. Haas, published The Lutheran Cyclopedia in 1899.

Lutheran Archives Center in Philadelphia holds a large collections of materials relating to Lutheran clergy, theologians and church workers including personal papers of Henry Eyster Jacobs.

== Selected works ==
- First Free Lutheran Diet in America, Philadelphia, December 27–28, 1877 (1878)
- The Lutheran movement in England during the reigns of Henry VIII and Edward VI, and its literary monuments (1890)
- The Lutheran Movement in England (1891)
- History of the Lutheran Church in America (1893)
- Elements of Religion (1894)
- Annotations on the Epistles of Paul to the Romans and I. Corinthians (1896)
- Annotations on the Epistles of Paul to I. Cortinthians VII-XVI, II. Corinthians and Galatians (1897)
- Martin Luther, the hero of the reformation (1898)
- The German Emigration to America, 1709- 40 (1899)
- The Lutheran Cyclopedia. (1899)
- Summary of the Christian Faith (1905)

== Other sources ==
- Wolf, Edmund Jacob. The Lutherans in America; a story of struggle, progress, influence and marvelous growth (J. A. Hill & Company, New York: 1890)
- "Growing pains – LTSP 150th Anniversary Timeline". The Lutheran Theological Seminary at Philadelphia 150th Celebration.
- LTSP Communications (April 29, 2014). "Henry Eyster Jacobs - Carmine Pernini". Archived from the original on December 14, 2021 – via YouTube.
