= Jennie Wade =

Battle of Gettysburg civilian casualty

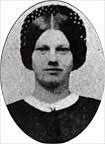
Jennie Wade

Mary Virgin Wade (May 21, 1843 – July 3, 1863), also known as Jennie Wade or Ginnie Wade, was a resident of Gettysburg, Pennsylvania during the Battle of Gettysburg. At the age of 20, she was the only direct civilian casualty of the battle, when she was killed by a stray bullet on July 3, 1863.

The house where she was killed is now a popular tourist attraction and museum called the "Jennie Wade House".

== Early life ==
Wade was born in Gettysburg, and worked as a seamstress with her mother in their house on Breckenridge Street while her father was in a mental asylum. She may have been engaged to Johnston Hastings "Jack" Skelly, a corporal in the 87th Pennsylvania, who had been wounded two weeks earlier in the Battle of Winchester. He died from his injuries on July 12, 1863, unaware that Wade had died days earlier.

== Casualty of war ==
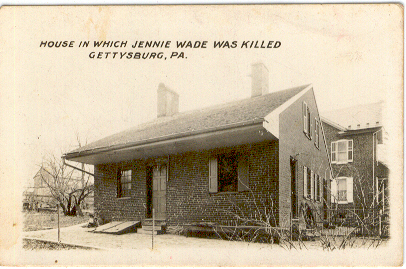
Early 1900s photograph of Jennie Wade's house

Wade, her mother, and two younger brothers left their home in central Gettysburg and traveled to the house of her sister, Georgia Anna Wade McClellan at 548 Baltimore Street to assist her and her newborn child. It was July 1, 1863, during the first day's fighting of the Battle of Gettysburg. More than 150 bullets hit the McClellan house during the fighting.

About 8:00 a.m. on July 3, Wade was kneading dough for bread when a Minié ball traveled through the kitchen door and the parlor door of her sister's house and hit her. It pierced her left shoulder blade, went through her heart, and ended up in her corset. She was killed instantly. While it is uncertain which side fired the fatal shot, some authors have attributed it to an unknown Confederate sharpshooter.

Wade's mother heard her fall to the floor and went to tell her sister Georgia in the other room that her sister had been shot dead; two Union soldiers came from upstairs when they heard the screams of the women. They temporarily buried Wade's body in the back yard of the McClellan house, in a coffin originally intended for the Confederate General William Barksdale. In January 1864, her body was relocated to the cemetery of the German Reformed Church on Stratton Street. Her final resting place is located in the Evergreen Cemetery in Gettysburg. On July 4, her mother baked 15 loaves of bread with the dough Wade had kneaded.

In 1882, the United States Senate voted to grant Wade's mother a pension, citing that her daughter had been killed serving the Union cause – baking bread for the soldiers.

== Monument ==
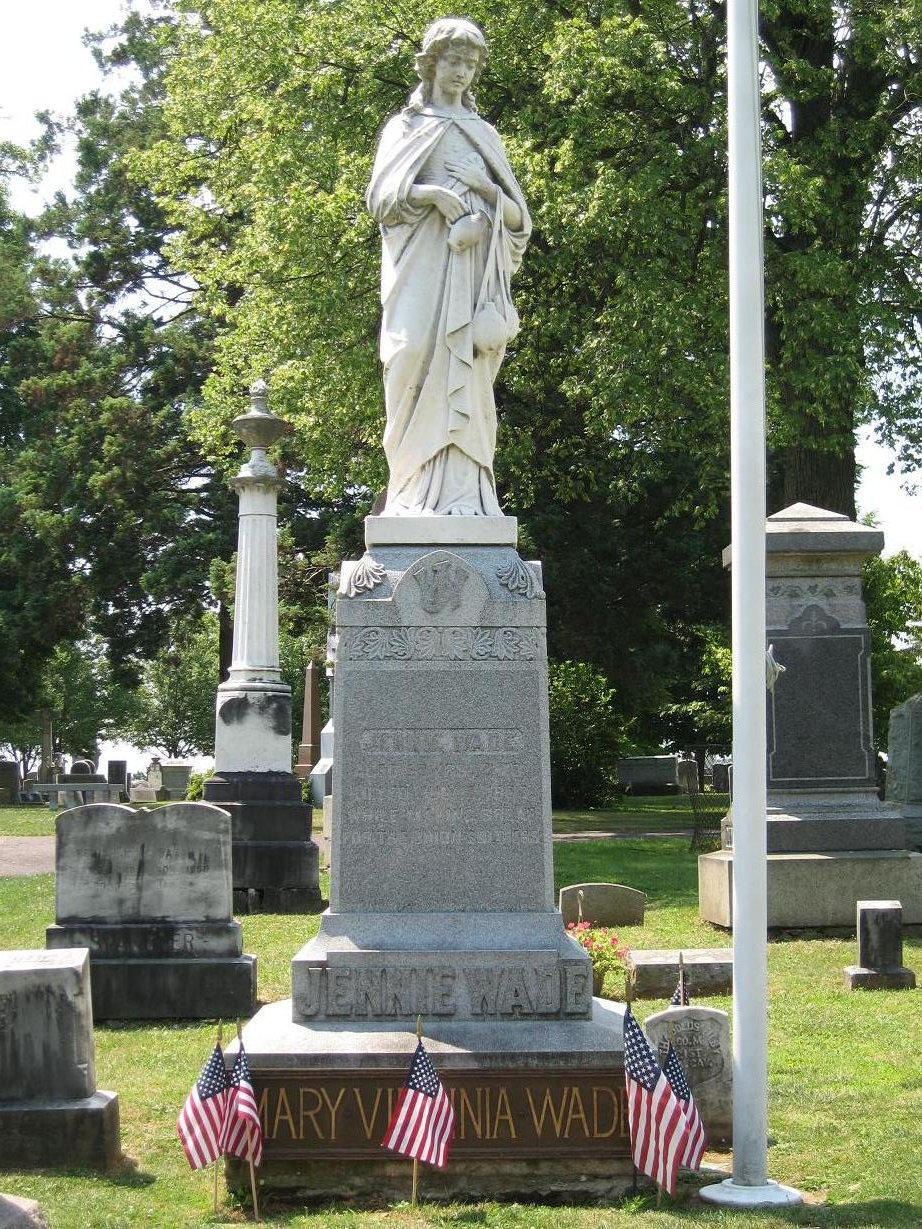

In November 1865, Wade's remains were reburied in the Evergreen Cemetery near Jack Skelly. A monument to her, designed by Gettysburg resident Anna M. Miller, was erected in 1900 that includes an American flag that flies around the clock. (The Betsy Ross House in Philadelphia is the only other site devoted to a woman to share this distinction of the perpetual flag. The Evergreen Cemetery grave of John L. Burns also flies the perpetual flag.)
