= Laura Brown (chemist) =

American chemist

Laura Caroline Brown is an organic chemist and senior lecturer at Indiana University Bloomington.

== Early life and education ==
Brown was born and grew up in Freeport, Illinois. She graduated with a Bachelor of Science in chemistry from Illinois Wesleyan University in 2002 where she was inducted into Phi Beta Kappa. She worked under Professor Ram S. Mohan working on chemoselective reactions of acetals and ketals promoted by bismuth salts. In 2008, she completed her Ph.D. under Professor Amir H. Hoveyda at Boston College. Here, she focused on enantioselective catalysis of alkyl nucleophiles to ketone and ketoimine substrates. She was awarded a National Institutes of Health Postdoctoral Fellowship which led to her doing postdoctoral work at Harvard Medical School under Professor Jon Clardy. Her postdoctoral research was largely focused on natural product discovery and biosynthesis.

== Career ==
Brown joined the Department of Chemistry at Indiana University in 2011 as a lecturer. She has an interest in fostering and enriching the education of undergraduates. She leads an undergraduate research group which works collaboratively with other groups by synthesizing compounds for the other groups’ use. Laura also has been working to provide skills from research experience in a nontraditional way for students who may not be able to do research. She has developed a Course-based Undergraduate Research Experience (CURE)-lab course which aims to give students a lot of the same skills as traditional research experience would. In addition, she serves as the treasurer of the Southern Indiana Section of the American Chemical Society.

=== Awards ===
- Summer Instructional Development Fellowship, 2016
- Trustees Teaching Award, Indiana University, 2016
- SISACS Volunteer of the Year Award, 2016

== Notable publications ==
- Production of α-Galactosylceramide by a Prominent Member of the Human Gut Microbiota. L. C. Wieland Brown, C. Penaranda, P. C. Kashyap, B. B. Williams, J. Clardy, M. Kronenberg, J. L. Sonnenburg, L. E. Comstock, J. A. Bluestone, M. A. Fischbach, PLoS Biology, 2013, 11, e1001610.
- Thirteen Posttranslational Modifications Convert a Fourteen-Residue Peptide into the Antibiotic Thiocillin. L. C. Wieland Brown, M. G. Acker, J. Clardy, C. T. Walsh, M. A. Fischbach, Proceedings of the National Academy of Sciences, 2009, 106, 2549–2553.
