= Julia Jacobs Harpster =

American missionary

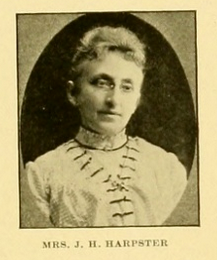
Julia Jacobs Harpster (1846-1935), Lutheran missionary in India

Julia Jacobs Harpster (December 17, 1846 – July 1, 1935) was an American missionary working among women in India.

== Early life and education ==
Mary Julia Jacobs was born in Gettysburg, Pennsylvania, in 1846, daughter of Dr. Michael Jacobs and Julia M. Eyster Jacobs. Her father was a professor of mathematics and chemistry at Gettysburg College. She attended school at The Maplewood in Pittsfield, Massachusetts.

== Career ==
Julia Jacobs Harpster went to India as a Lutheran missionary with her husband in 1893, based at Rajahmundry. She was superintendent of the Industrial School for Mohammedan Women, which taught gold and silver embroidery and other handwork skills to Muslim widows and other women in need of paid employment; she also supervised a bookstore in Rajahmundry and raised funds for the mission's work there with the sale of postcards depicting Indian scenes. "The silent influence of her winsome Christian spirit is a potent factor among her heathen pupils," a denominational publication wrote of Julia Harpster. In 1902, she published a book of photographs, Among the Telugoos: Illustrating Mission Work in India. She and her husband were credited with founding "India Lace Day", an annual observance in American Lutheran churches where funds were raised for women lacemakers in India, and shipments of supplies were sent for their use. The Harpsters retired from their work in Rajahmundry in 1909.

== Personal life ==
Julia Jacobs married Rev. Dr. John Henry Harpster in 1882. Her husband had already served years in missionary work in India, from 1871 to 1876, and was a veteran of the Union Army during the American Civil War. She was widowed when he died in 1911. As a memorial to her husband, Julia Harpster donated some land in Kotagiri to the Lutheran missions there, to build bungalows for their work. She died in 1935, age 88.

Her brothers were the Rev. Dr. Henry Eyster Jacobs, president of Lutheran Theological Seminary at Philadelphia, and a judge, Michael William Jacobs.
