= Laura A. Brown =

American activist and politician (1874–1924)

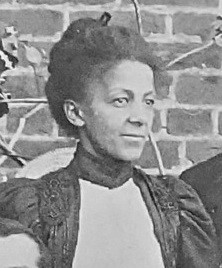
- Born: Laura Penn; November 8, 1874; Gettysburg, Pennsylvania
- Died: 1924
- Known for: first African-American to run for state legislature in Pennsylvania

Laura A. Brown (née Penn; 1874–1924) was an American activist and local politician. She was the first African-American to run for the state legislature in Pennsylvania.

== Personal life ==
Brown was born Laura Penn on November 8, 1874, in Gettysburg, Pennsylvania. She married George Brown at a young age. They lived in Pittsburgh, Pennsylvania and had one daughter.

== Public life ==
Brown was an active member of the Pennsylvania Federation of Colored Women's Clubs and her church choir.

During World War I, Brown led a war savings stamp campaign that allowed individual citizens to help fund the U.S. war effort. Later, during Warren G. Harding's presidential campaign, Brown became a member of the executive board of the Republican Women's Committee of Allegheny County and the Republican Council of Women of the City-County Federation of Allegheny.

In 1922, Brown became the first African-American to run for state legislature in Pennsylvania as a candidate for the First District in Allegheny County. She did not win election.
