= James Gettys (founder of Gettysburg) =

Founder of Gettysburg, Pennsylvania

James Gettys (August 14, 1759 – March 13, 1815) was the founder of Gettysburg, Pennsylvania.

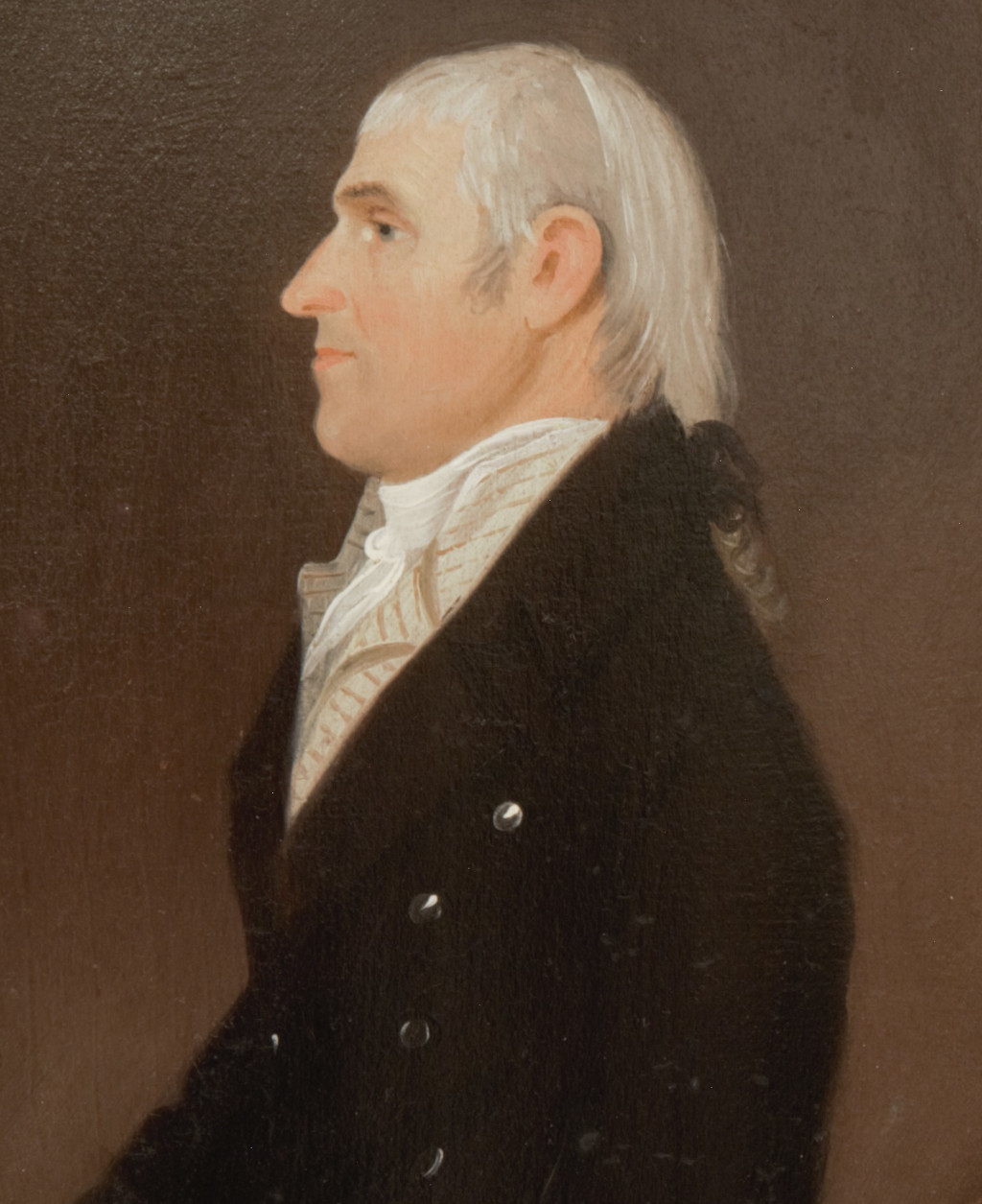
General James Gettys, founder of Gettysburg, portrait by Jacob Eichholz, circa 1814.

== Personal life ==
He was born on August 14, 1759, in the Marsh Creek Settlement in Pennsylvania. His parents, Samuel and Isabella (Ramsey) Gettys, were Scottish and Irish and emigrated from Ireland. James was born with a twin sister named Ann, who died shortly after birth. James' other siblings included Mary (1752–1823), Elizabeth (1755–1788), William (1757–1813), John (1761–1776), Isabella (1764-?), and Martha (1768–1815). James married Mary Todd. They had two children, James Gettys Jr. (1799–1879) and Robert Todd (1809–1827).

== The founding of Gettysburg ==
On October 9, 1786, Gettys purchased 116 acres of his father's property during a bankruptcy auction for 790 pounds. The valuable land was in the crossroads of York Road and Black Gap Road (Baltimore Road). The legal transfer was officially recognized by John Penn and John Penn, Jr., on April 17, 1787 and entered into the York County Court records on April 18, 1787. In late 1786, James Gettys took the 116 acres and divided them into 220 lots. He held an official lottery in which area citizens purchased the rights to buy one or more lots. This is recognized as the official beginning of the town originally named Gettystown.

== Community investments ==
In January 1799, during the formation of a new county, James Gettys promised to donate land for a jail and county courthouse, as well as the quit rents of 200 town lots to the future county, if Gettystown was named as the county seat. On January 22, 1800, Governor Thomas McKean issued an Act of Assembly which formed a new county named Adams with Gettystown as the county seat.

Gettys invested in two turnpike companies created to cover dirt roads with gravel for easier traveling and commerce in and out of Gettysburg. On April 7, 1807, Governor McKean approved the creation of the Gettysburg and Petersburg Turnpike Company. Gettys was the Treasurer. Similarly, on February 6, 1811, Governor Simon Snyder approved the creation of the Gettysburg and Blacks' Turnpike Company, in which Gettys was an investor.

In March 1813, Gettys and several local men petitioned the state legislators for the right to create a bank in Adams County. The legislators passed an Act of General Assembly approving the request, but Governor Snyder vetoed it. On April 29, 1814, his veto was overridden and the act was passed. Gettys sold the organizers one lot in the center of town for erecting the bank. Thus, the bank was located in Gettysburg and named the Bank of Gettysburg. On May 26, 1814, Gettys was elected as a Bank Director.

== Civil servant ==
On October 18, 1803, Gettys was elected Sheriff of Gettysburg, a position he held for 3 years. On May 21, 1806, he was elected both Town Clerk and Treasurer of the Borough of Gettysburg. In 1807, he was elected to the Town Council in Gettysburg. He was also elected to the Assembly for the Commonwealth of Pennsylvania and served from 1807-1809. In 1812, Gettys was elected as Gettysburg Borough's fire director. In 1815, he was elected Burgess of the town.

== Military career: American Revolution ==
Samuel Gettys, James' father, owned the famous Gettys Tavern where the Pennsylvania Rifleman Battalion and the Pennsylvania Militia met on June 24, 1775, to sign up and join the American Revolutionary War for independence. In 1781, James Gettys joined the war as a cornet for the Light Horsemen of York County, a volunteer company in the Light Horse Battalion of the Pennsylvania Militia under Colonel Irvine.

== Later military career ==
In 1786, Gettys was promoted to lieutenant under Captain James Hamilton in a Troop of Light Horse. In 1794, during the Whiskey Rebellion in Western Pennsylvania, Gettys was commissioned as a second major in the 4th Regiment of the Militia of York County under the command of Brigadier General Henry Mille. In 1800, James Gettys was promoted to lieutenant colonel of 20th Regiment of the Militia of Adams County. In 1814, during the War of 1812 he was promoted to brigadier general, 5th Division. Then, in the later half of 1814, during a reorganization of the state militia, Gettys became the vice brigadier general. He remained in that position until his death.

== Court-martial ==
In 1802, at the height of the political infighting between the Federalist Party and the Democrat-Republican Party, the Republican Governor of Pennsylvania, Thomas McKean, mandated the state militia men change from the traditional Federalist black cockade to a new red and blue one to differentiate Pennsylvania's militia. Several of Getty's officers were slow to change their cockades. Republicans also accused those who did follow the mandate of wearing red and blue cockades that were too small. The disagreement escalated and progressed to a physical fight during the General's Parade in Gettysburg in November 1802. On November 15, 1802, Gettys was court-martialed. His trial was held on December 6, 1802, at the home of Major William Sturgeon in New Oxford. Gettys was found guilty of allowing his men to train wearing the black cockade. He was temporarily suspended and fined $10.

== Death ==
In March 1815, many members of the Gettys family died of what was thought to be typhus fever, spread from the epidemic in Maryland. On March 15, 1815, after 11 days of illness, James Gettys died. In total, the disease killed five people in his family, leaving his two young sons, James Jr. and Robert Todd, orphans.

Gettys was originally buried in Gettysburg Presbyterian Church's cemetery at Washington and Railroad Street. When the church moved to its current location, James Gettys, Jr. paid for his parents' exhumation and reburial in Evergreen Cemetery.
