= Freedom Transit (Adams County, Pennsylvania) =

- Parent: York Adams Transportation Authority
- Service area: Borough of Gettysburg, Pennsylvania
- Service type: Bus
- Routes: 3
- Fleet: 5
- Fuel type: Diesel
- Operator: Adams County Transit Authority
- Website: www.ridethetrolley.com

Freedom Transit is the operator of mass transportation in the borough of Gettysburg, Pennsylvania. Service began on June 29, 2009, with free rides for the first week of service. The York Adams Transportation Authority voted to discontinue service as of December 30, 2013, for Lincoln, Blue, Grey and Gold Line. Express service to Harrisburg will continue until June 30, 2014.

The parent company, the York Adams Transportation Authority (YATA), operates four routes, one of which is seasonal, to make a number of pre-determined stops before returning to a transfer center on Carlisle Street, just north of Lincoln Square. The transit center also serves as a hub for rabbittransit's rabbitEXPRESS service between Gettysburg and Harrisburg.

== Routes ==
Routes operate through most of the day during the peak tourist season, however, service is decreased for the winter, when ridership is expected to be less.

- Lincoln Line (Red)- Lincoln Square-Gettysburg Nat'l Cemetery-Gettysburg Military Park
- Blue Line- Herr's Ridge-Gettysburg College-Deatrick Commons
- Grey Line- Wellspan Hospital-HACC Gettysburg Campus-Lincoln Square
- Gold Line- Parking areas - Visitors Center (seasonal)

A complete circuit of each route takes approximately one hour.

== Fleet ==
Freedom Transit operates five replica trolleys.

== Fare structure ==
One way rides are $1, free for college students with ID and children under 44 inches. Prior to March 2014, fares for all passengers was free, however due to state budget cuts, the transit agency began charging fares.
