= Gettysburg, Pennsylvania =

Borough in Pennsylvania, United States

Gettysburg
- Borough
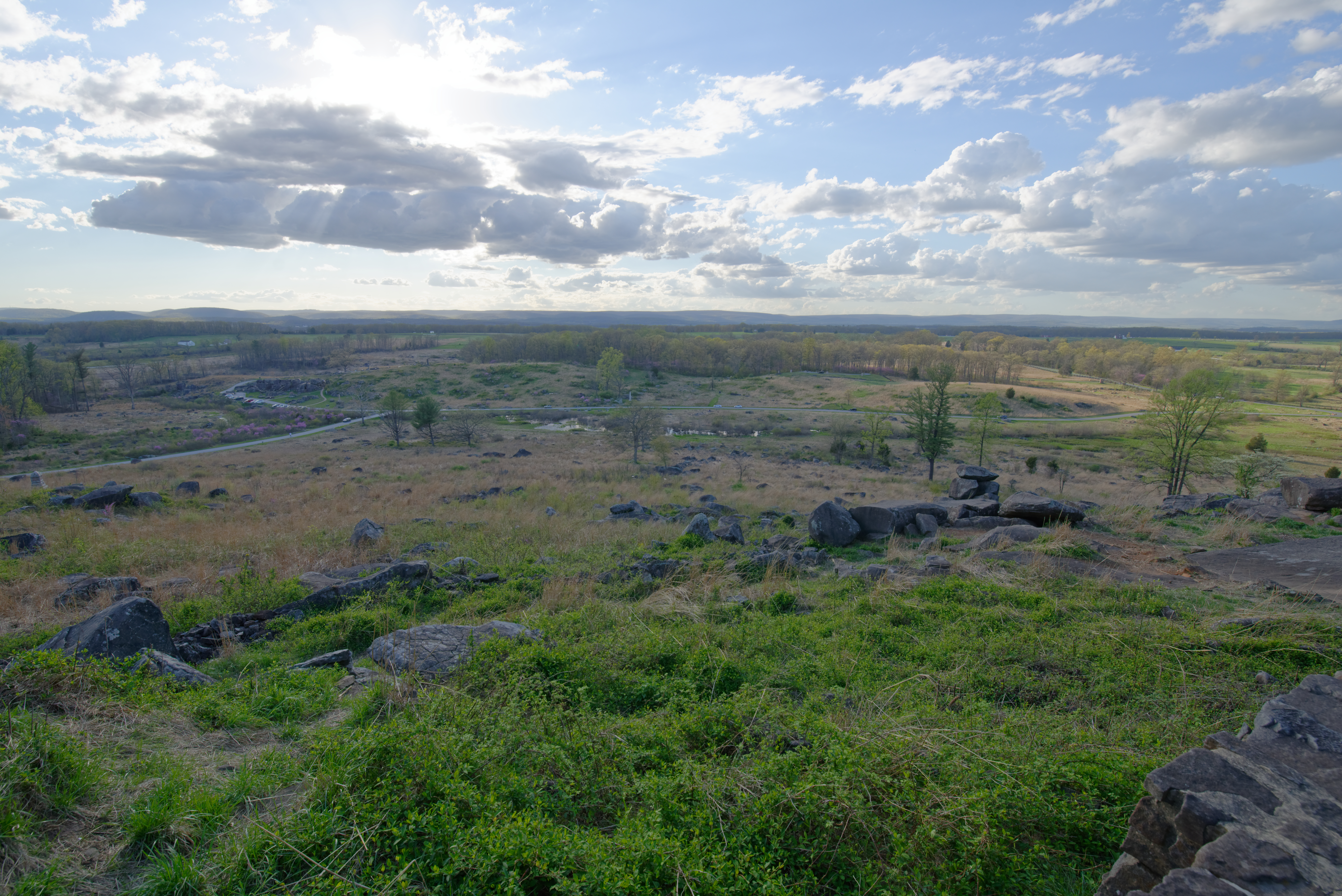
- Gettysburg National Military Park in April 2019

- Flag Seal

- Location in Adams County and the U.S. state of Pennsylvania.

- Location within Pennsylvania Location within the United States
- Coordinates: 39°49′42″N 77°13′56″W
- Country: United States
- State: Pennsylvania
- County: Adams
- Settled: 1780
- Incorporated: 1806
- Founder: James Gettys
- Named for: Samuel Gettys

Government
  - Type: Borough Council
  - Mayor: Alison Lintal (D)

Area
  - Total: 1.66 sq mi (4.31 km^{2})
  - Land: 1.66 sq mi (4.30 km^{2})
  - Water: 0.0039 sq mi (0.01 km^{2})
- Elevation: 560 ft (170 m)

Population (2020)
  - Total: 7,106
  - Density: 4,281.3/sq mi (1,653.03/km^{2})
- Time zone: UTC-5 (Eastern (EST))
  - Summer (DST): UTC-4 (EDT)
- ZIP Code: 17325
- Area code: 717
- FIPS code: 42-28960
- Website: https://www.gettysburgpa.gov/

Gettysburg (/ˈɡɛtizbɜːrɡ/; locally /ˈɡɛtɪsbɜːrɡ/) is a borough in Adams County, Pennsylvania, United States, and its county seat. As of the 2020 census, the borough had a population of 7,106 people.

Gettysburg was the site of the Battle of Gettysburg, which was fought in Gettysburg over three days from July 1 to 3, 1863, during the American Civil War. With over 50,000 combined casualties, the Battle of Gettysburg is both the deadliest battle of the Civil War and in all of American history. The battle, which was won by the Union army, also proved the turning point of the war, leading to the Union's victory two years later and the nation's preservation. Later that year, on November 19, President Abraham Lincoln traveled to present-day Gettysburg National Cemetery, where he participated in a ceremonial consecration of the cemetery and delivered the Gettysburg Address, a carefully crafted 271-word address, which is considered one of the most famous speeches in history.

Gettysburg is home to Gettysburg National Military Park, which includes Gettysburg Battlefield, where the Battle of Gettysburg was largely fought.

== History ==
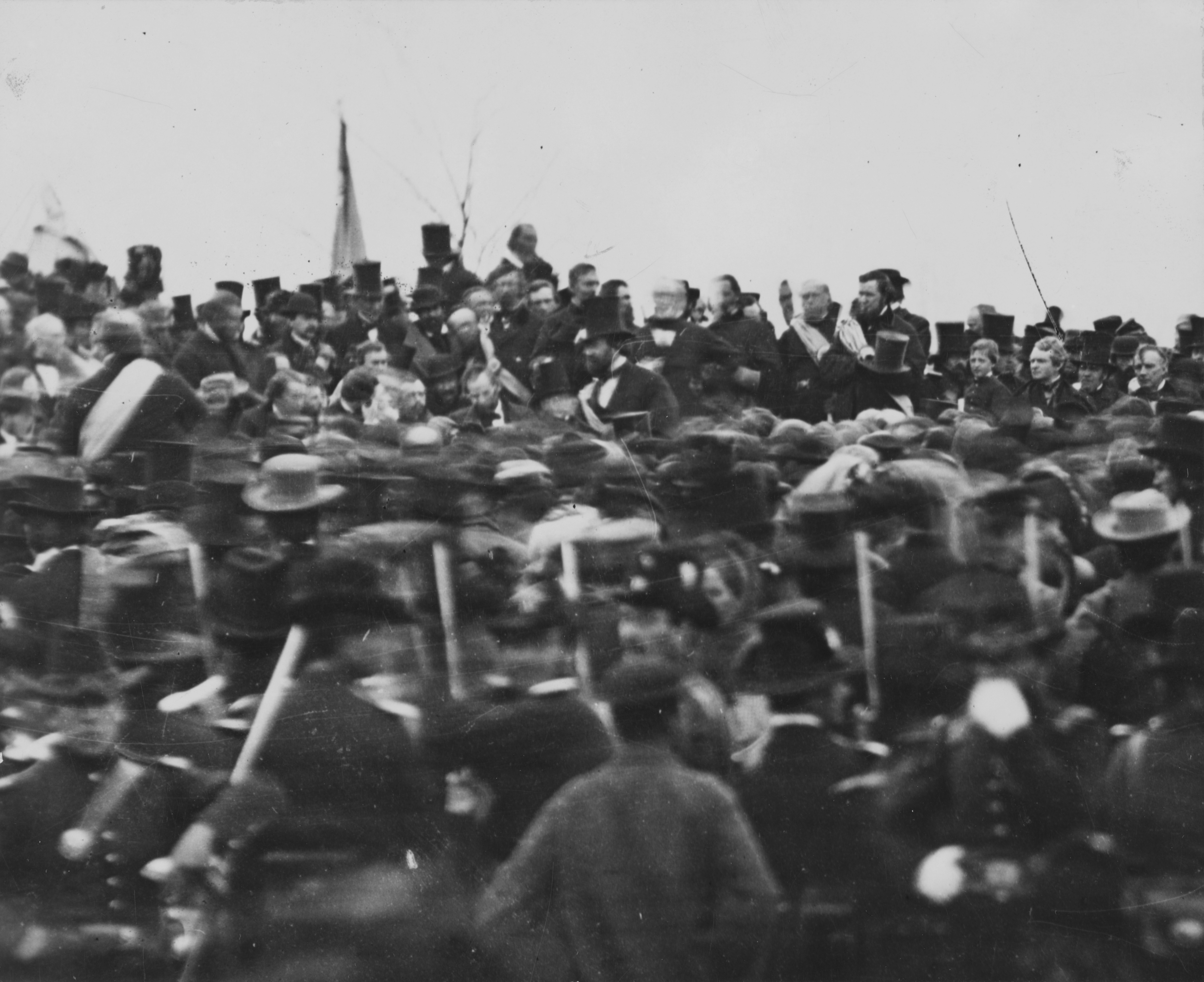
On November 19, 1863, U.S. President Abraham Lincoln (center, facing camera) delivered the Gettysburg Address, considered one of the most famous speeches in American history.

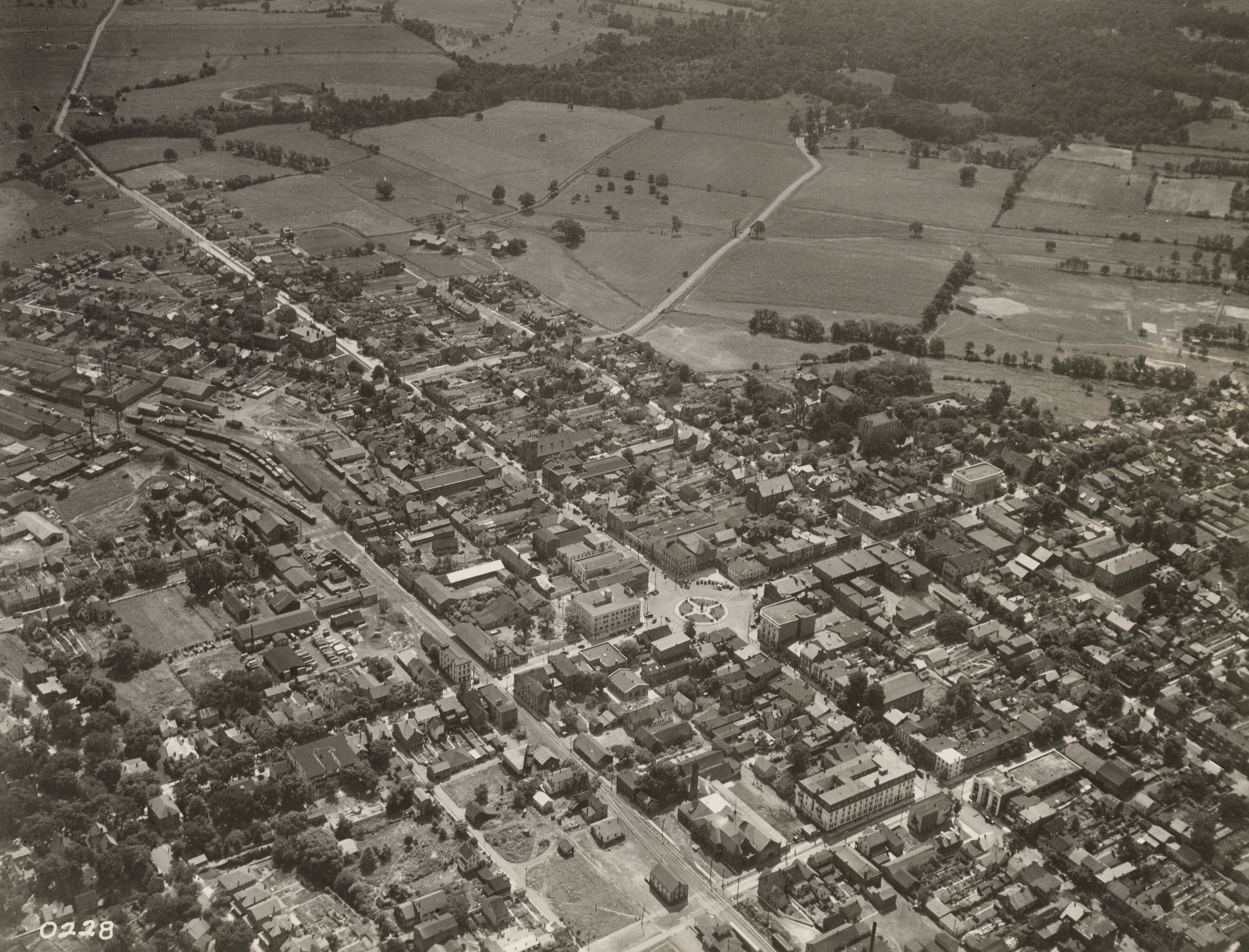
Downtown Gettysburg in 1930

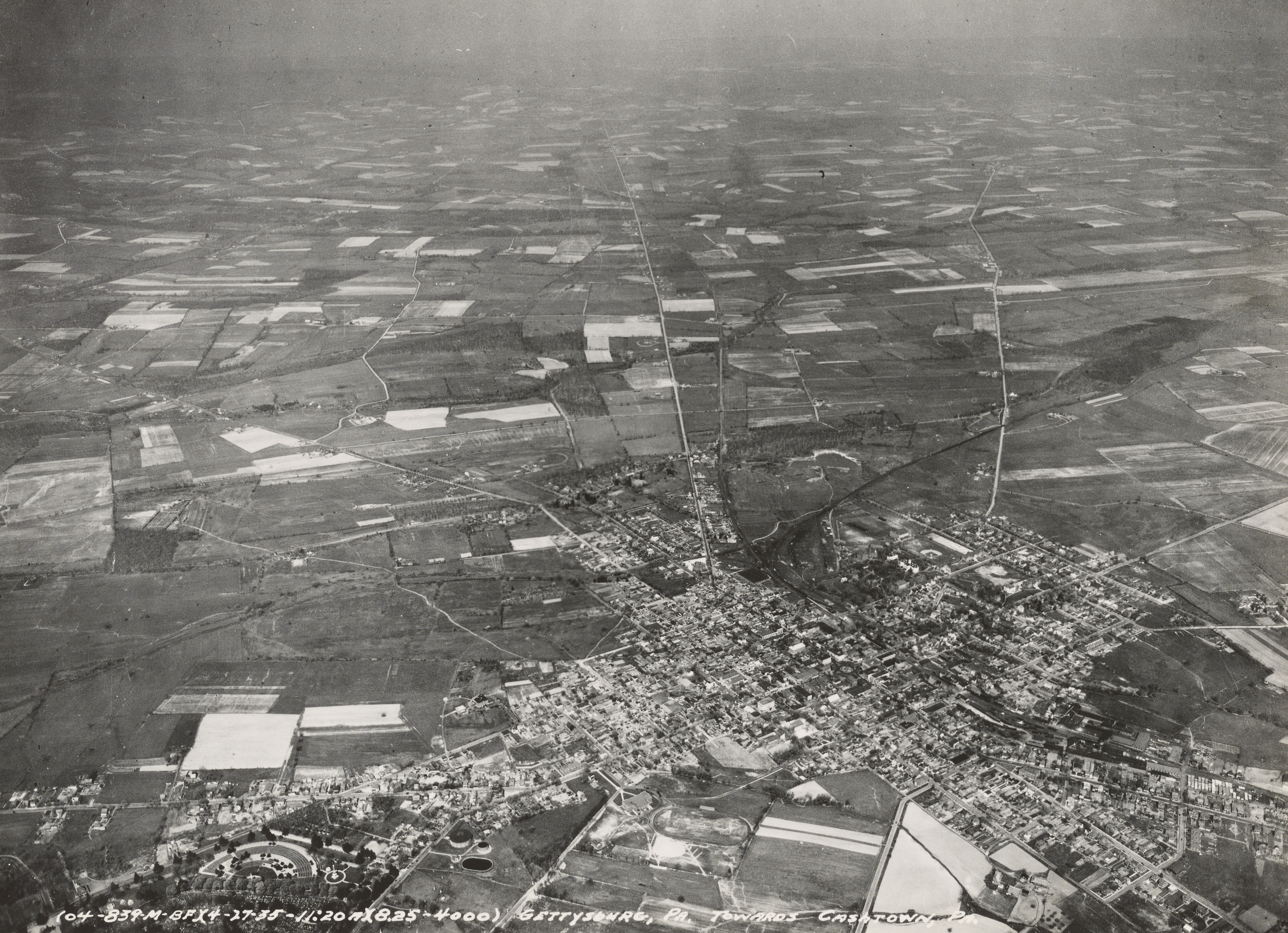
Gettysburg in 1935

=== 18th century ===
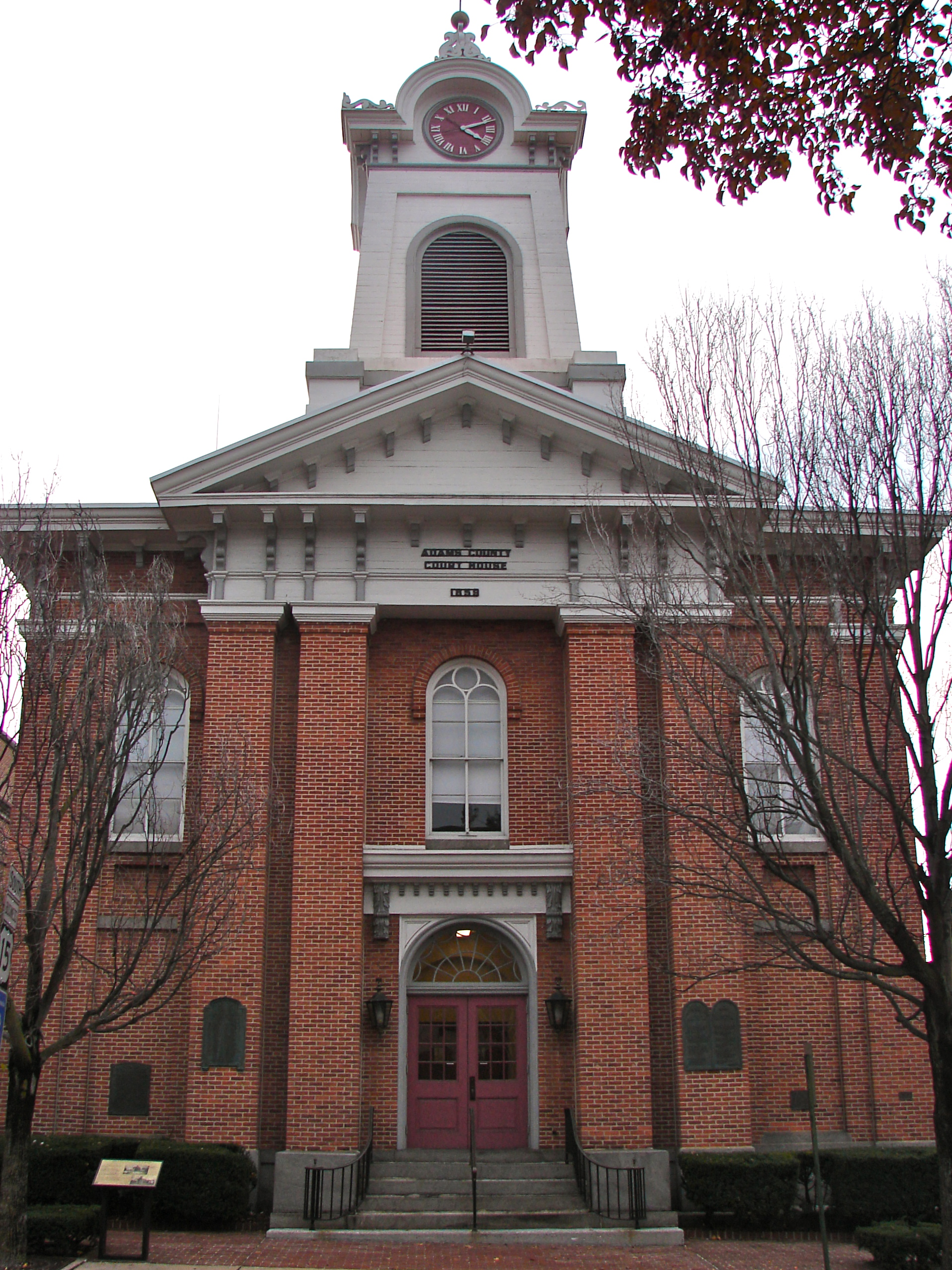
Adams County Courthouse

In 1760, Irishman Samuel Gettys settled at the Shippensburg-Baltimore and Philadelphia-Pittsburgh crossroads, in what was then western York County, and established a tavern frequented by soldiers and traders. In 1786, his son James purchased 116 acres of his land, divided it up into 220 lots and sold them, and is thus considered the founder of Gettysburg. The borough boundary was established, with the Dobbin House tavern (established in 1776) sitting in the southwest.

Beginning in 1790, a movement seeking to split off the western portion of York County into a separate county had begun. A commission was drawn up to fix the site of the new county's seat; they ultimately chose a location in Strabane Township (now Straban Township), just northeast of Gettysburg. In 1791, additional trustees were appointed to plan to construct public buildings in Gettysburg instead of in Straban.

=== 19th century ===
On January 22, 1800, the Pennsylvania Legislature created Adams County, and named Gettysburg as its county seat.

In 1858, the Gettysburg Railroad completed the construction of a railroad line from Gettysburg to Hanover, and the Gettysburg Railroad Station opened a year later. Passenger train service to the town ended in 1942. The station was restored in 2006. In 2011, Senator Robert Casey introduced S. 1897, including the railroad station within the boundary of Gettysburg National Military Park. By 1860, the borough had grown in size to consist of "450 buildings [which] housed carriage manufacturing, shoemakers, and tanneries".

==== Civil War ====
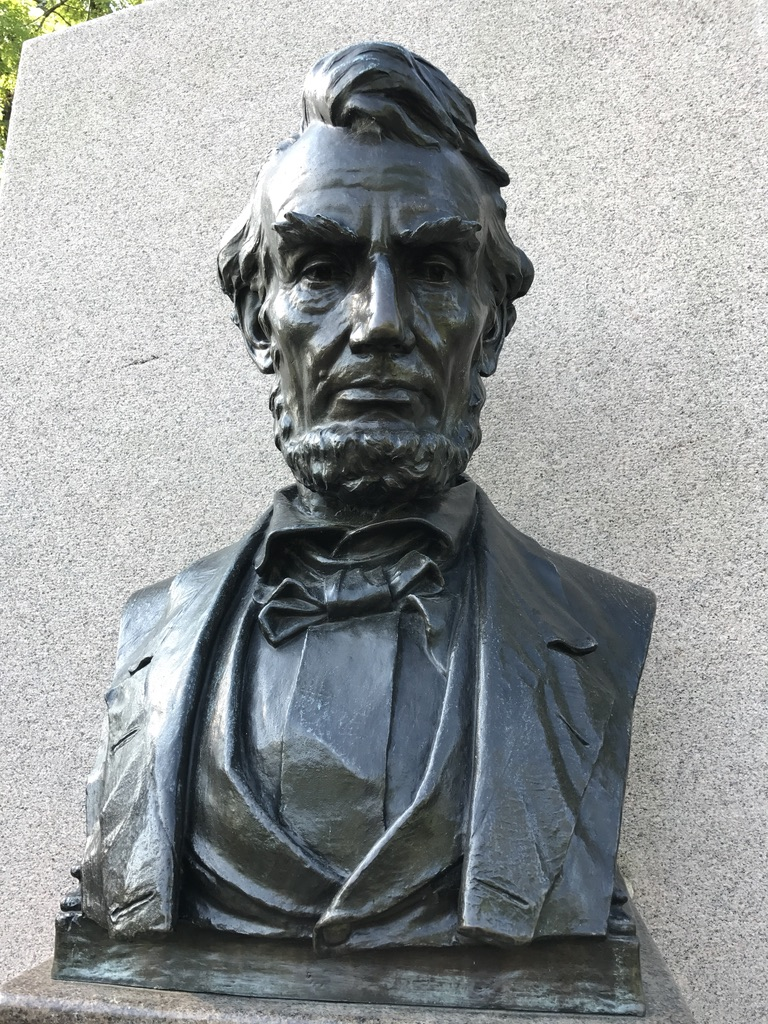
A bust of Lincoln at Gettysburg

Between July 1 and 3, 1863, the Battle of Gettysburg, one of the bloodiest battles during the American Civil War, was fought across the fields and heights surrounding the town.

The Confederate Army of Northern Virginia, under the command of Robert E. Lee, experienced success in the early stages of the battle but was ultimately defeated by the Army of the Potomac, commanded by George G. Meade. Lee executed an orderly withdrawal and escaped across the Potomac River without being drawn into another battle. Meade was heavily criticized by President Abraham Lincoln for his cautious pursuit and failure to destroy Lee's retreating army.

Casualties were high, with total losses on both sides – over 27,000 Confederate and 23,000 Union. The residents of Gettysburg were left to care for the wounded, and bury the dead following the Confederate retreat. Approximately 8,000 men and 3,000 horses lay under the summer sun. The Union soldiers' bodies were gradually reinterred in what is today known as Gettysburg National Cemetery, where, on November 19, 1863, Abraham Lincoln attended a ceremony to officially consecrate the grounds and delivered his Gettysburg Address.

A 20-year-old woman, Jennie Wade, was the only civilian killed during the battle. She was hit by a stray bullet that passed through her kitchen door while she was making bread on July 3.

Physical damage can still be seen in some of the houses throughout the town, notably the Schmucker House located on Seminary Ridge.

=== 20th century ===
Camp Colt, a military training camp, was established on the fields of the Military Park in 1918. The camp was commanded by Dwight D. Eisenhower, who would later purchase a farm in the area.

The battlefields were used again during World War II. Camp Sharpe, a military camp which trained soldiers for psychological operations, was established in 1943 and operated for one year. Between 1944 and 1946, several hundred German prisoners of war were held between the Gettysburg Armory and a camp on the battlefield.

== Industry and economy ==
The furniture manufacturing industry employed people in Gettysburg for the first half of the 20th century. The "Gettysburg Manufacturing Company", formed in 1902, was the first company established in the borough for the purpose of manufacturing residential furniture. Other companies soon followed. The borough's industry reached peak production and success about the 1920s. This important industry declined from 1951, when the three main companies either moved, closed or were sold. The Gettysburg Furniture Company factory closed in 1960, becoming a warehouse and distribution point for other furniture factories outside of Pennsylvania.

=== Tourism ===
Gettysburg manufacturing associated with tourism included a late 19th century foundry that manufactured gun carriages, bridgeworks and cannons for the Gettysburg Battlefield, as well as a construction industry for hotels, stables, and other buildings for tourist services. Early tourist buildings in the borough included museums (like the 1881 Danner Museum), souvenir shops, buildings of the electric trolley (preceded by a horse trolley from the Gettysburg Railroad Station to the Springs Hotel), and stands for hackmen who drove visitors in jitneys (horse-drawn group taxis) on tours. Modern tourist services in the borough include ghost tours, bed and breakfast lodging, and historical interpretation (reenactors, etc.).

Gettysburg National Military Park extends partially into the Gettysburg borough limits, though it is mostly in nearby Cumberland Township. Gettysburg National Cemetery, of the Military Park, is in the borough limits. Cumberland Township is also the site of the Eisenhower National Historic Site, which preserves the home and farm of Dwight D. Eisenhower.

== Geography ==
Gettysburg is located near the intersection of U.S. routes 15 and 30, approximately 25 miles (40 km) west of York and 35 miles (56 km) north of Frederick, Maryland. Rock Creek, a tributary of the Monocacy River and part of the Potomac River watershed, flows along its eastern edge. According to the United States Census Bureau, the borough has a total area of 1.7 square miles (4.3 km^{2}), all land.

=== Climate ===
Gettysburg lies in the humid continental climate zone of northern and central Pennsylvania (although it would have a humid subtropical climate under the −3 °C (27 °F) isotherm), just north of the humid subtropical zone of central Maryland, with hot, humid summers and cool winters. On average, January is the coldest month, with an average temperature of 29.8 °F (−1.2 °C). Winters range from cool to moderately cold, with relatively frequent snowfalls. July is the warmest month, with an average temperature of 74.4 °F (23.6 °C), and June is the wettest month. The hottest temperature recorded in Gettysburg was 104 °F (40 °C) on July 16, 1988, while the coldest temperature recorded was −25 °F (−32 °C) on January 21, 1994.

Climate data for Gettysburg, Pennsylvania (Eisenhower National Historic Site), 1991–2020 normals, extremes 1982–2010
Month	Jan	Feb	Mar	Apr	May	Jun	Jul	Aug	Sep	Oct	Nov	Dec	Year
Record high °F (°C)	72 (22)	78 (26)	87 (31)	93 (34)	93 (34)	98 (37)	104 (40)	104 (40)	98 (37)	92 (33)	83 (28)	79 (26)	104 (40)
Mean daily maximum °F (°C)	39.6 (4.2)	43.2 (6.2)	52.2 (11.2)	64.3 (17.9)	73.3 (22.9)	81.8 (27.7)	86.2 (30.1)	84.7 (29.3)	77.8 (25.4)	66.4 (19.1)	55.5 (13.1)	44.7 (7.1)	64.1 (17.8)
Daily mean °F (°C)	30.2 (−1.0)	32.7 (0.4)	41.2 (5.1)	52.0 (11.1)	61.2 (16.2)	69.6 (20.9)	74.5 (23.6)	72.7 (22.6)	65.9 (18.8)	54.5 (12.5)	43.9 (6.6)	35.3 (1.8)	52.8 (11.5)
Mean daily minimum °F (°C)	20.8 (−6.2)	22.3 (−5.4)	30.1 (−1.1)	39.7 (4.3)	49.1 (9.5)	57.4 (14.1)	62.8 (17.1)	60.8 (16.0)	54.0 (12.2)	42.6 (5.9)	32.4 (0.2)	26.0 (−3.3)	41.5 (5.3)
Record low °F (°C)	−25 (−32)	−14 (−26)	−6 (−21)	16 (−9)	27 (−3)	35 (2)	43 (6)	35 (2)	31 (−1)	20 (−7)	12 (−11)	−5 (−21)	−25 (−32)
Average precipitation inches (mm)	3.45 (88)	2.73 (69)	3.59 (91)	3.42 (87)	4.09 (104)	4.74 (120)	3.61 (92)	4.13 (105)	4.63 (118)	3.71 (94)	3.02 (77)	3.34 (85)	44.46 (1,130)
Average snowfall inches (cm)	4.4 (11)	11.2 (28)	1.6 (4.1)	0.1 (0.25)	0.0 (0.0)	0.0 (0.0)	0.0 (0.0)	0.0 (0.0)	0.0 (0.0)	0.0 (0.0)	0.5 (1.3)	3.7 (9.4)	21.5 (54.05)
Average precipitation days (≥ 0.01 in)	8.7	7.0	9.3	9.6	10.5	10.7	9.1	7.7	8.6	7.8	7.7	8.0	104.7
Average snowy days (≥ 0.1 in)	2.3	2.1	0.9	0.2	0.0	0.0	0.0	0.0	0.0	0.0	0.2	1.5	7.2
Source 1: NOAA (snow/snow days 1981–2010)
Source 2: National Weather Service

Pennsylvania's first on-farm methane digester was built near Gettysburg at the Mason-Dixon Farm in 1978, and generates 600KW.

== Demographics ==
Historical population
Census	Pop.	Note	%±
1830	1,473		—
1840	1,908		29.5%
1850	2,180		14.3%
1860	2,390		9.6%
1870	3,074		28.6%
1880	2,814		−8.5%
1890	3,221		14.5%
1900	3,495		8.5%
1910	4,030		15.3%
1920	4,439		10.1%
1930	5,584		25.8%
1940	5,916		5.9%
1950	7,046		19.1%
1960	7,960		13.0%
1970	7,275		−8.6%
1980	7,194		−1.1%
1990	7,025		−2.3%
2000	7,490		6.6%
2010	7,620		1.7%
2020	7,106		−6.7%

=== 2020 census ===
Gettysburg borough, Pennsylvania – Racial and ethnic composition Note: the US Census treats Hispanic/Latino as an ethnic category. This table excludes Latinos from the racial categories and assigns them to a separate category. Hispanics/Latinos may be of any race.
Race / Ethnicity (NH = Non-Hispanic)	Pop 2000	Pop 2010	Pop 2020	% 2000	% 2010	% 2020
White alone (NH)	6,208	6,066	5,249	82.88%	79.61%	73.87%
Black or African American alone (NH)	412	411	382	5.50%	5.39%	5.38%
Native American or Alaska Native alone (NH)	23	13	29	0.31%	0.17%	0.41%
Asian alone (NH)	95	142	269	1.27%	1.86%	3.79%
Native Hawaiian or Pacific Islander alone (NH)	2	0	3	0.03%	0.00%	0.04%
Other race alone (NH)	15	11	35	0.20%	0.14%	0.49%
Mixed race or Multiracial (NH)	134	143	265	1.79%	1.88%	3.73%
Hispanic or Latino (any race)	601	834	874	8.02%	10.94%	12.30%
Total	7,490	7,620	7,106	100.00%	100.00%	100.00%

== Industry ==
The main industry of the borough is tourism associated with such historic sites as Gettysburg National Military Park (including the Gettysburg National Cemetery) and Eisenhower National Historic Site. Gettysburg has many activities and tours to offer to vacationers and tourists who are interested in the Gettysburg area and the history of the community and the battle. Tourists for the annual reenactment of the Battle of Gettysburg use borough facilities, which include the Dobbin House Tavern and Hotel Gettysburg.

=== Battle of Gettysburg reenactment ===
Every year from July 1–3 volunteers reenact the Battle of Gettysburg. Each day re-enactors display a different part of the battle with commentary regarding the hardships of the battles. The battles are narrated by the battlefield guides of the Gettysburg National Military Park.

== Transportation ==
Many roads radiate from Gettysburg, providing hub-like access to Washington, D.C. 75 miles (121 km), Baltimore 55 miles (89 km), Harrisburg 37 miles (60 km), Carlisle 27 miles (43 km), Frederick and Hagerstown, Maryland 32 miles (51 km) and Hanover, Pennsylvania 14 miles (23 km). York is 30 miles (48 km) east on the Lincoln Highway (U.S. Route 30), the first transcontinental U.S. highway, and Chambersburg is 25 miles (40 km) west on it. Today the borough is a 2 1/2 hour drive from Philadelphia and a 3 1/2 hour drive from Pittsburgh via the Pennsylvania Turnpike and U.S. Route 15.

Gettysburg Regional Airport, a small general aviation airport, is located in Cumberland Township, 2 miles (3.2 km) west of Gettysburg.

The main east–west road through downtown Gettysburg is U.S. Route 30, which is known as York Street east of Lincoln Square and Chambersburg Street west of Lincoln Square.

York Adams Transportation Authority (YATA) operates public transportation in Adams County. Freedom Transit, implemented in 2009, The hub of the bus system, the new Gettysburg Transit Center, is under construction on Carlisle Street. Beginning in 2011, a Rabbit Transit commuter bus to Harrisburg runs two times each weekday in each direction.

== Media ==
- The Gettysburg Times, a daily newspaper
- Raices De Todos, a bilingual monthly cultural magazine, serves the city's growing Latino/Hispanic population
- The Evening Sun, a daily newspaper
- Celebrate Gettysburg, a lifestyle magazine
- WGET-AM 1320 and WGTY-FM 107.7, owned by the Times and News Publishing Company
- WZBT-FM 91.1, a non-commercial radio freeform format station owned by Gettysburg College
- The Adams County News was a newspaper located in Gettysburg, which was published 1908–17. (Available in digitized form online.)
- Gettysburg is located in the Harrisburg-Lancaster-Lebanon-York, PA media market. Television stations that cover Gettysburg news include WHTM-TV and WHP-TV in Harrisburg, WGAL in Lancaster, and WPMT in York. Some Gettysburg residents also receive broadcasts from WJZ-TV in Baltimore, Maryland and WDVM-TV in Hagerstown, Maryland.

== Films & Documentaries ==
Gettysburg has been the setting of many films and documentaries surrounding the Battle of Gettysburg, including Gettysburg (1993), The Gettysburg Address (2017), and Gettysburg: Darkest Days & Finest Hours (2008).

Films not related to the historic battle include A Gettysburg Christmas (2023) and 1000 to 1: The Cory Weissman Story (2014).

== Education ==
=== K-12 education ===
Gettysburg is served by the Gettysburg Area School District.

Schools in Gettysburg borough include Lincoln Elementary School and Gettysburg Area Middle School. Gettysburg Area High School is in nearby Straban Township. James Gettys Elementary School, which has a Gettysburg postal address, is in Cumberland Township. While all parts of the school district are assigned to the same middle and high schools, different areas are zoned to different elementary schools: parts of the borough are zoned to Lincoln Elementary, other parts are zoned to James Gettys Elementary, and some parts are given the choice between the two schools.

Vida Charter School is in Cumberland Township.

=== Colleges ===
It is also served by Gettysburg College, Harrisburg Area Community College Gettysburg Campus (in Cumberland Township), and a campus of the United Lutheran Seminary (Lutheran Theological Seminary at Gettysburg, mostly in the borough limits, with portions in Cumberland Township)

== Sister cities ==
Gettysburg's sister cities are:

- (United States) Gettysburg, South Dakota, since 1997
- León, Nicaragua, since 1987
- Sainte-Mère-Église, France, since 1993
- Morelia, Mexico, since 2004
- Sekigahara, Japan, since 2016

== Notable buildings ==
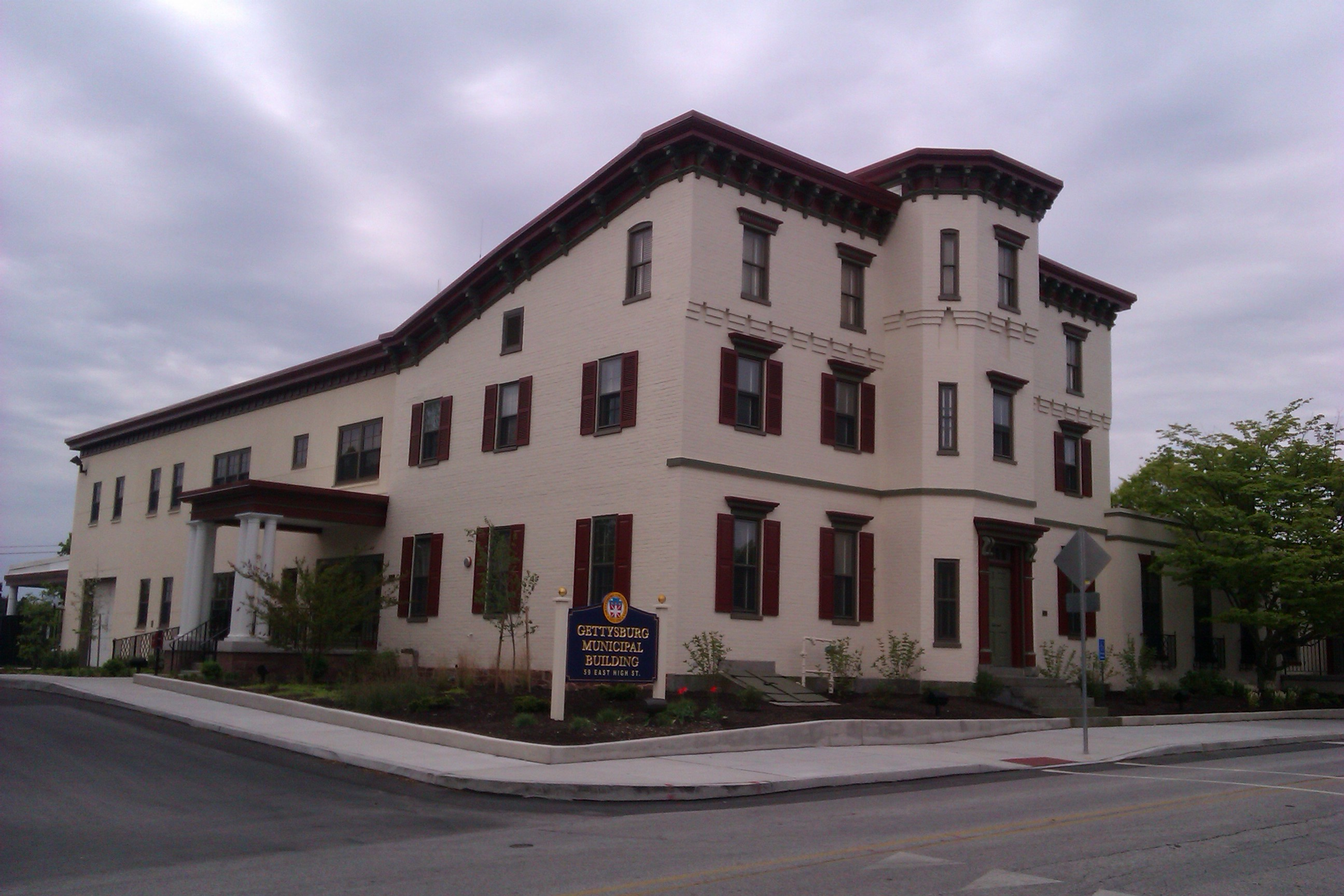
Gettysburg Municipal Building

- Eisenhower National Historic Site: Preserves the home and farm of Dwight D. Eisenhower, the 34th President of the United States, and its surrounding property of 690.5 acres (279.4 ha)
- Federal Building, the main Adams County Library since 1992, was the War Department/National Park Service headquarters of Gettysburg National Military Park from 1912 to 1962
- Adams County Courthouse

== Notable people ==
- Laura A. Brown (1874–1924), American activist and local politician
- Brian Patrick Clarke, American film and television actor born in 1952.
- Steve Courson, former NFL player, played football at and graduated from Gettysburg Area High School in 1973. His #71 is the only number to be retired by GAHS.
- Dwight D. Eisenhower, 34th U.S. president, and his wife Mamie Eisenhower, retired to a farm near Gettysburg after leaving the White House in 1961. He lived there until his death in 1969.
- Julia Jacobs Harpster (1846–1935), American Lutheran missionary in India, born in Gettysburg.
- The Rev. Henry Eyster Jacobs (1844–1932), theologian and Lutheran seminary president.
- Julia H. Johnston, Christian songwriter who composed Grace Greater Than All Our Sin.
- Elizabeth C. Keller (1837–1912), physician
- Fritz Pfeiffer (1889–1960), artist.
- Eddie Plank, member of the Baseball Hall of Fame, was born in Gettysburg in 1875 and played baseball at Gettysburg College.
- The Rev. Samuel Simon Schmucker, a founder of Gettysburg College, and Lutheran Theological Seminary at Gettysburg.
- Jeff Shaara (1952-), Award-winning American novelist who has written fifteen New York Times bestselling novels.
- Thaddeus Stevens, Gettysburg Attorney and leader of the Radical Republicans as an opponent to slavery.
- John Studebaker, co-founder of what would become the Studebaker Corporation automobile company, was born in Gettysburg in 1833.
- Elizabeth Thorn (1832–1907), Evergreen Cemetery caretaker who buried approximately 100 fallen soldiers after the Battle of Gettysburg.
- William T. Ziegler (1840–1916), member of the Pennsylvania House of Representatives
