= William T. Ziegler =

American politician (1840–1916)

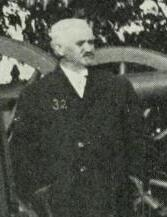
- Ziegler in 1910

Member of the Pennsylvania House of Representatives from the Adams County district
- In office 1891–1894

Personal details
- Born: William Thomas Ziegler; October 3, 1840 Gettysburg, Pennsylvania, U.S.
- Died: March 6, 1916 (aged 75) Gettysburg, Pennsylvania, U.S.
- Resting place: Evergreen Cemetery
- Party: Democratic
- Spouse: Rebecca Harmon (m. 1867)
- Children: 5
- Occupation: Politician; businessman

William Thomas Ziegler (October 3, 1840 – March 6, 1916) was an American politician and businessman from Pennsylvania. He was a member of the Pennsylvania House of Representatives from 1891 to 1894.

== Early life ==
William Thomas Ziegler was born on October 3, 1840, in Gettysburg, Pennsylvania, as the fifth child to Sarah (née Radford) and Samuel Ziegler. His father was a hatter in Gettysburg. His grandfather Emanuel Ziegler was a soldier in the Revolutionary War. From the age of 10 to 15, Ziegler learned the hatter's trade. He attended night schools in Philadelphia. He then took up coach painting.

== Career ==
Ziegler served as a corporal with Company F of the 87th Pennsylvania Infantry Regiment. He served with the Third Army and 6th Army Corps during the war. He served from 1861 to 1865 and was prisoner of war in 1863. At the Battle of Weldon Railroad in 1864, he was taken prisoner again and was imprisoned at Andersonville Prison until the end of the war. Following confinement, he lost sight in one of his eyes. Following the war, he painted coaches for two years and then engaged in manufacturing of coaches and carriages for two years. In 1870, he started a livery business with W. D. Hoitzworth and continued the business for some years. He was vice president of the Citizens' Trust Company and president of the Gettysburg Mutual Fire Insurance Company.

Ziegler was elected school director of Gettysburg for three terms. He was elected to the Gettysburg council from 1890 to 1891. He was elected as a Democrat to the Pennsylvania House of Representatives, representing Adams County from 1891 to 1894. He built a hotel in place of the Eagle Hotel after it was destroyed. He built a structure on North Washington Street that later became a shirt factory. He was owner of a clothing factory and engaged in real estate.

Ziegler was commander of Corporal Skelly Post 9 of the Grand Army of the Republic (G.A.R.) several times. He was president of the Association of Southern Pennsylvania G.A.R. He attended various state and national G.A.R. encampments.

== Personal life ==
Ziegler married Rebecca Harmon, daughter of Samuel Harmon, of Straban Township in 1867. They had five children, John S., W. E., Charles T., Mrs. John D. Lippy and Mame.

Ziegler died on March 6, 1916, at his home on Springs Avenue in Gettysburg. He was buried in Evergreen Cemetery.
