= Dagwell =

Dagwell is a surname. Notable bearers of this name include:

- Benjamin D. Dagwell (1890–1963), American Episcopal bishop
- George A. Dagwell (1841–1906), Union Army scout, wounded and captured at the Battle of Fairfax Court House (1863)
- James Dagwell (born 1974), British journalist
- Natalie Dagwell (1886–1965), American vaudeville singer

== See also ==
- Bagwell
- Darwell
