= Battle of Fairfax Court House =

Battle of Fairfax Court House may refer to:

- Battle of Fairfax Court House (June 1861)
- Battle of Fairfax Court House (June 1863)
