= Codorus Township, Pennsylvania =

Township in Pennsylvania, US

Coordinates: 39°44′00″N 76°46′59″W

- Township
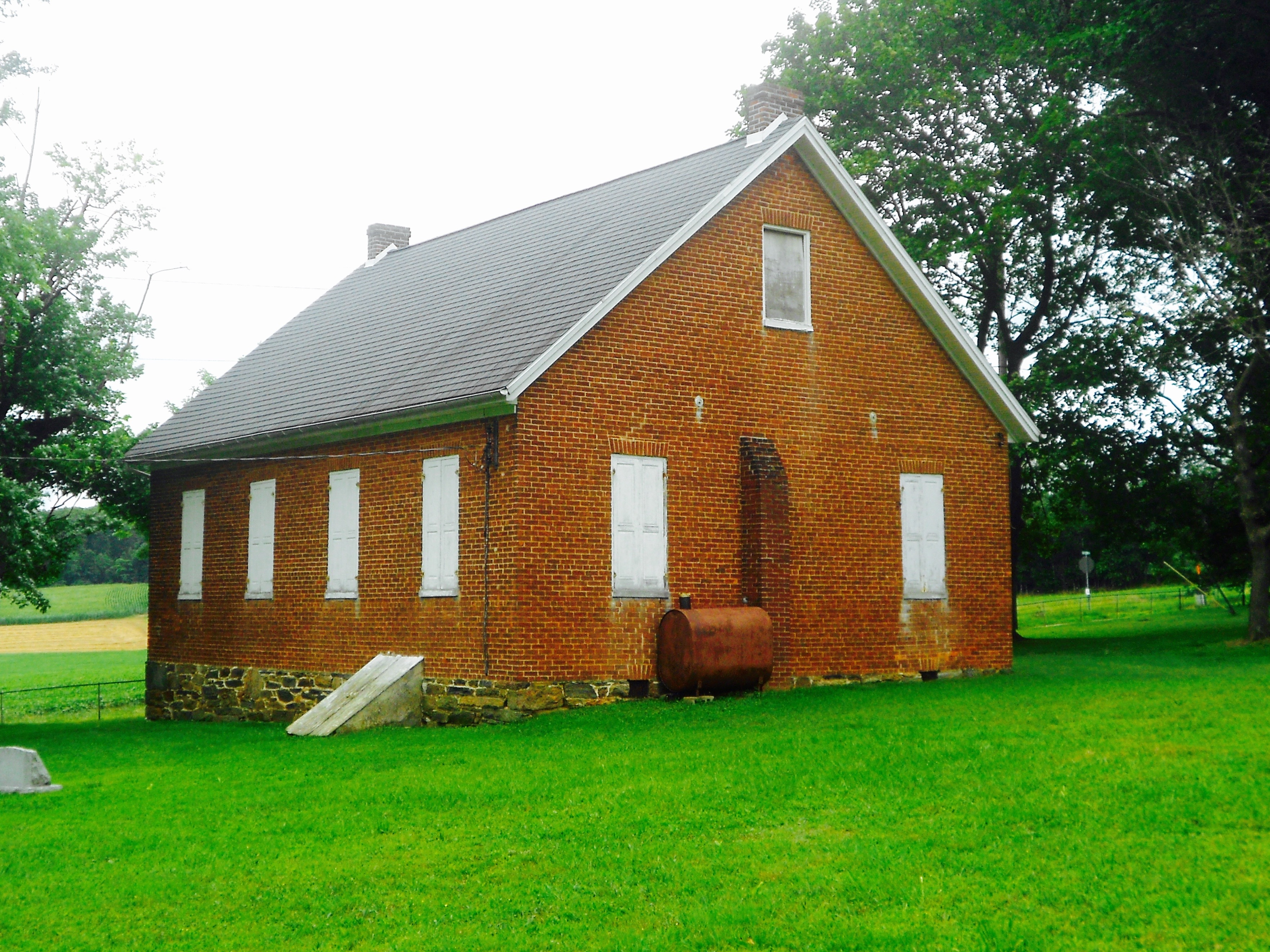
- Church on Chestnut Grove Rd., south of Jefferson

- Seal

- Location in York County and the state of Pennsylvania.
- Country: United States
- State: Pennsylvania
- County: York
- Settled: 1734
- Incorporated: 1747

Government
  - Type: Board of Supervisors

Area
  - Total: 33.45 sq mi (86.64 km^{2})
  - Land: 33.45 sq mi (86.64 km^{2})
  - Water: 0 sq mi (0.00 km^{2})

Population (2020)
  - Total: 3,904 ▲
  - Estimate (2023): 3,948
  - Density: 115.9/sq mi (44.74/km^{2})
- Time zone: UTC-5 (Eastern (EST))
  - Summer (DST): UTC-4 (EDT)
- Area code: 717
- FIPS code: 42-133-14832
- Website: codorustownship.org

Historical population
Census	Pop.	Note	%±
1850	971		—
1860	1,842		89.7%
1870	2,002		8.7%
1880	2,261		12.9%
1890	2,322		2.7%
1900	2,251		−3.1%
1910	2,102		−6.6%
1920	1,824		−13.2%
1930	1,990		9.1%
1940	1,939		−2.6%
1950	2,168		11.8%
1960	2,394		10.4%
1970	2,762		15.4%
1980	3,591		30.0%
1990	3,653		1.7%
2000	3,646		−0.2%
2010	3,796		4.1%
2020	3,904		2.8%
2023 (est.)	3,948		1.1%
U.S. Decennial Census

Codorus Township (formerly known as South Codorus Township) is a township in York County, Pennsylvania, United States. The population was 3,904 at the 2020 census.

== History ==
The S. B. Brodbeck Housing was added to the National Register of Historic Places in 1990.

== Geography ==
According to the United States Census Bureau, the township has a total area of 33.5 square miles (87 km^{2}), all land. The township nearly encircles the borough of Jefferson, along the township's northern border.

== Demographics ==
At the 2000 census there were 3,646 people, 1,344 households, and 1,099 families living in the township. The population density was 108.9 inhabitants per square mile (42.0/km^{2}). There were 1,398 housing units at an average density of 41.8 units per square mile (16.1 units/km^{2}). The racial makeup of the township was 98.30% White, 0.08% African American, 0.44% Native American, 0.25% Asian, 0.25% from other races, and 0.69% from two or more races. Hispanic or Latino of any race were 0.22%.

Of the 1,344 households 31.7% had children under the age of 18 living with them, 71.4% were married couples living together, 5.7% had a female householder with no husband present, and 18.2% were non-families. 15.6% of households were one person and 6.9% were one person aged 65 or older. The average household size was 2.71 and the average family size was 2.99.

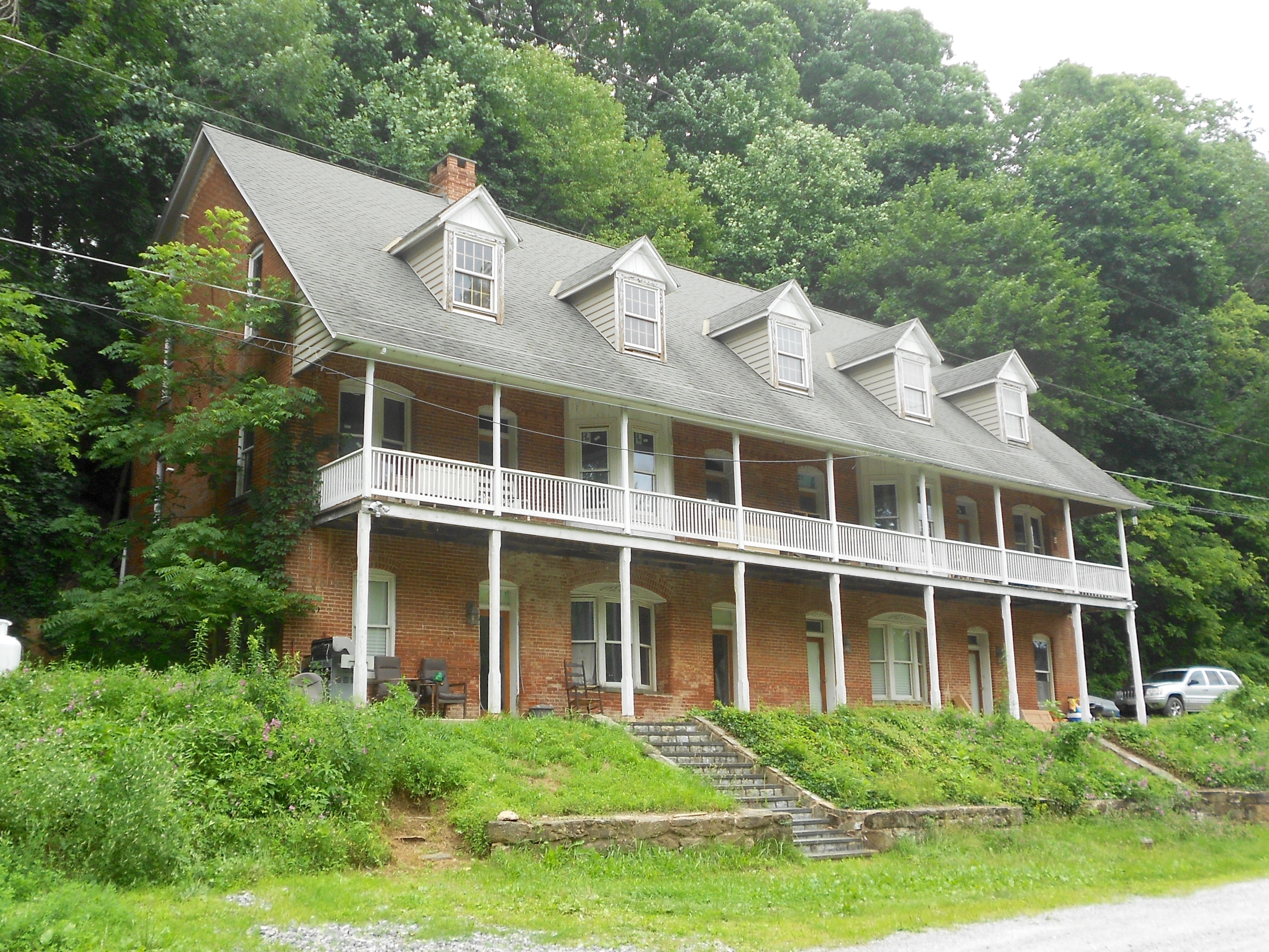
S. B. Brodbeck Housing

The age distribution was 23.6% under the age of 18, 6.8% from 18 to 24, 27.3% from 25 to 44, 29.9% from 45 to 64, and 12.3% 65 or older. The median age was 41 years. For every 100 females, there were 101.0 males. For every 100 females age 18 and over, there were 99.6 males.

The median household income was $48,514 and the median family income was $53,468. Males had a median income of $36,465 versus $24,022 for females. The per capita income for the township was $19,955. About 2.3% of families and 4.4% of the population were below the poverty line, including 6.2% of those under age 18 and 4.7% of those age 65 or over.
