= Gettysburg campaign =

Military campaign during the American Civil War

- Part of the Eastern theater of the American Civil War
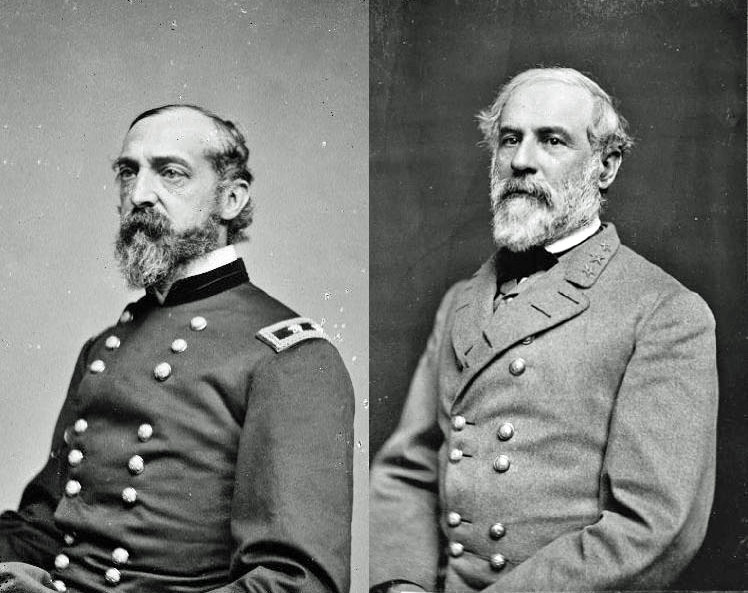
- Opposing commanders George Meade (left) and Robert E. Lee (right)
Date	June 3 – July 24, 1863
Location	Maryland, Pennsylvania, and Virginia 39°48′31″N 77°14′12″W
Result	Inconclusive (see Aftermath section)

Belligerents
United States	Confederate States

Commanders and leaders
(United States) Joseph Hooker (United States) George Meade (from June 28)	(Confederate States of America) Robert E. Lee

Units involved
(United States) Army of the Potomac	(Confederate States of America) Army of Northern Virginia

Strength
85,231–104,256	75,000

Casualties and losses
32,043 total (3,642 killed; 16,576 wounded; 11,825 captured/missing)	~27,000–32,000
- Location of Gettysburg in the United States

The Gettysburg campaign was a military invasion of Pennsylvania by the main Confederate army under General Robert E. Lee in summer 1863. It was the first time during the war the Confederate Army attempted a full-scale invasion of a free state. The Union won a decisive victory at Gettysburg, July 1–3, with heavy casualties on both sides. Lee managed to escape back to Virginia with most of his army. It was a turning point in the American Civil War, with Lee increasingly pushed back toward Richmond until his surrender in April 1865. The Union Army of the Potomac was commanded by Maj. Gen. Joseph Hooker and then (from June 28) by Maj. Gen. George Meade.

After his victory in the Battle of Chancellorsville, Lee's Army of Northern Virginia moved north for a massive raid designed to obtain desperately needed supplies, to undermine civilian morale in the North, and to encourage anti-war elements. Lee's army slipped away from Federal contact at Fredericksburg, Virginia, on June 3, 1863. The largest predominantly cavalry battle of the war was fought at Brandy Station on June 9. The Confederates crossed the Blue Ridge Mountains and moved north through the Shenandoah Valley, capturing the Union garrison at Winchester, in the Second Battle of Winchester, June 13–15. Crossing the Potomac River, Lee's Second Corps advanced through Maryland and Pennsylvania, reaching the Susquehanna River and threatening the state capital of Harrisburg. However, the Army of the Potomac was in pursuit and had reached Frederick, Maryland, before Lee realized his opponent had crossed the Potomac. Lee moved swiftly to concentrate his army around the crossroads town of Gettysburg.

The Battle of Gettysburg was the deadliest of the war. Starting as a chance meeting engagement on July 1, the Confederates were initially successful in driving Union cavalry and two infantry corps from their defensive positions, through the town, and onto Cemetery Hill. On July 2, with most of both armies now present, Lee launched fierce assaults on both flanks of the Union defensive line, which were repulsed with heavy losses on both sides. On July 3, Lee focused his attention on the Union center. The defeat of his massive infantry assault, Pickett's Charge, caused Lee to order a retreat that began the evening of July 4.

The Confederate retreat to Virginia was plagued by bad weather, difficult roads, and numerous skirmishes with Union cavalry. However, Meade's army did not maneuver aggressively enough to prevent Lee from crossing the Potomac to safety on the night of July 13–14.

== Background ==
=== Lee's plans ===
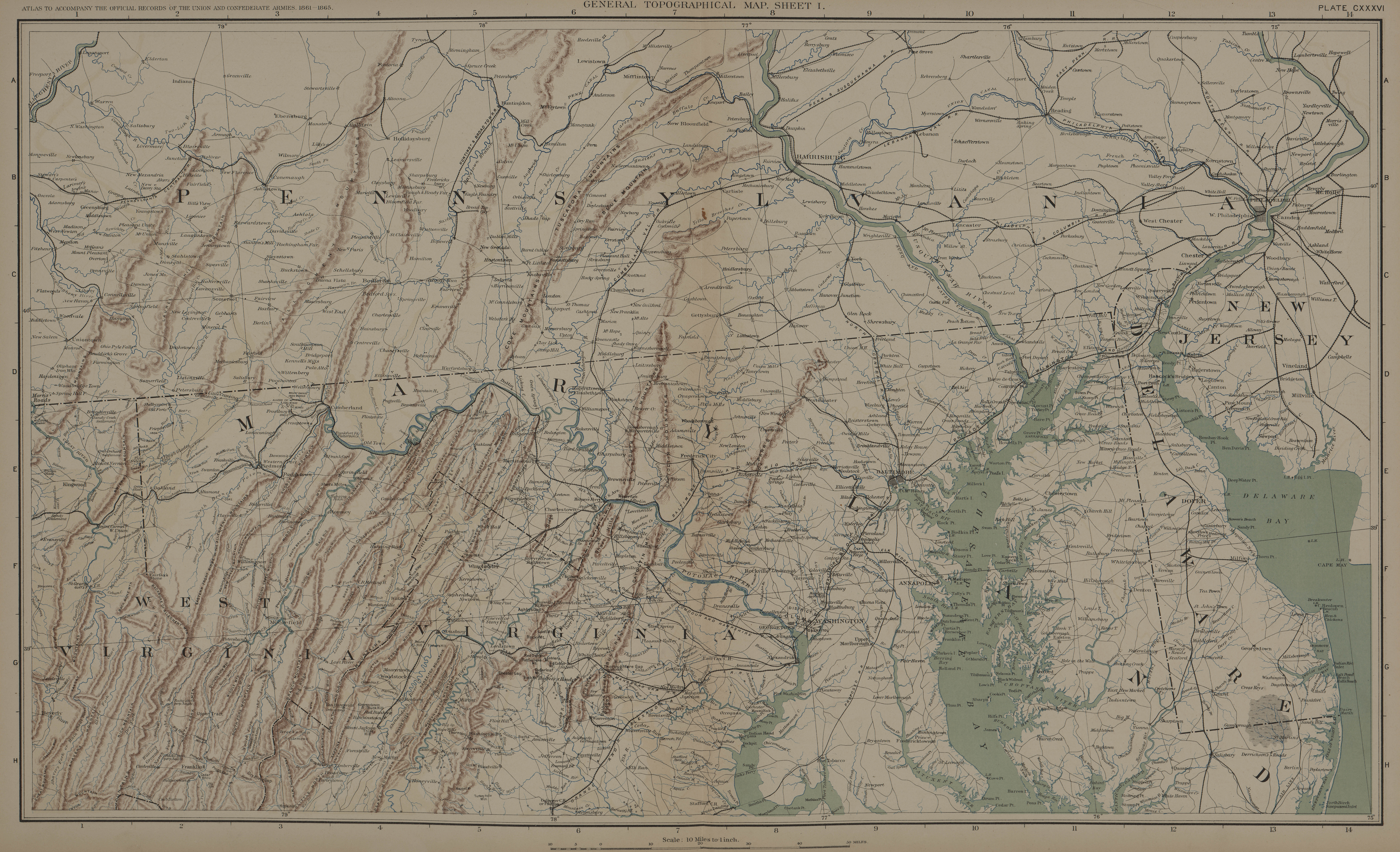
Northern Virginia, Maryland and Pennsylvania (1861–1865)

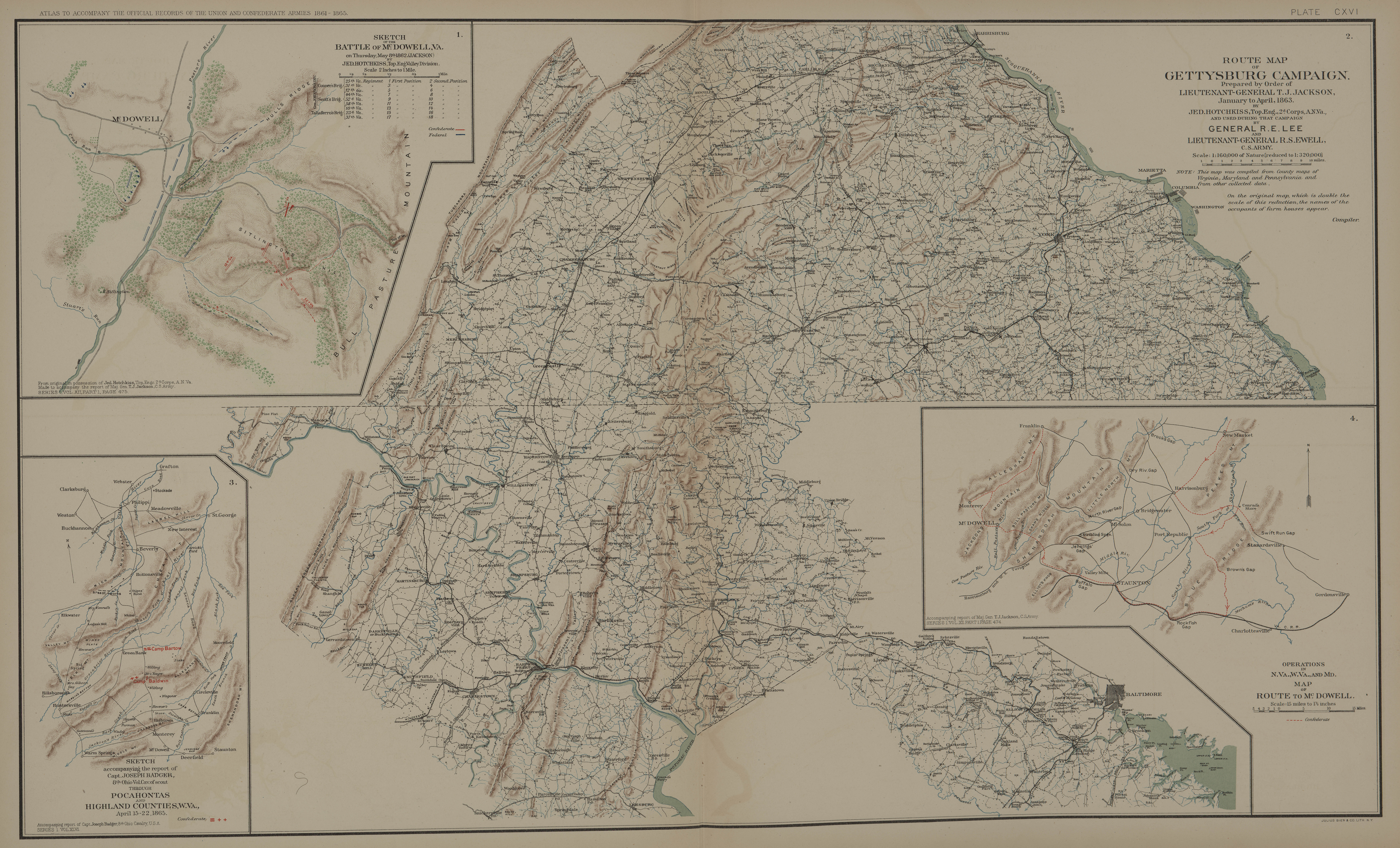
Gettysburg campaign, (1863)

Shortly after Lee's Army of Northern Virginia defeated Hooker's Army of the Potomac during the Chancellorsville Campaign (April 30 – May 6, 1863), Lee decided upon a second invasion of the North. Such a move would upset Union plans for the summer campaigning season, give Lee the ability to maneuver his army away from its defensive positions behind the Rappahannock River, and allow the Confederates to live off the bounty of the rich northern farms while giving war-ravaged Virginia a much needed break. Lee's army could also threaten Philadelphia, Baltimore, and Washington, and encourage the growing peace movement in the North.

Lee had numerous misunderstandings that shaped his strategy. Lee misread Northern opinion by his reliance on anti-war Copperhead newspapers for northern public opinion. Reading them, he assumed the Yankees must be just as war weary as southerners, and did not appreciate the determination of the Lincoln Administration. Lee did know he was seriously short of supplies for his own army, so he planned the campaign primarily as a full-scale raid that would seize supplies. He wrote:

If we can baffle them [Yankees] in their various designs this year & our people are true to our cause...our success will be certain.... [and] next year there will be a great change in public opinion at the North. The Republicans will be destroyed [in the 1864 presidential election] & I think the friends of peace will become so strong as that the next administration will go in on that basis. We have only therefore to resist manfully.

Lee was overconfident of the morale and equipment of his "invincible" veterans as a result of their performance at Chancellorsville; he fantasized about a definitive war-winning triumph:

[The Yankees will be] broken down with hunger and hard marching, strung out on a long line and much demoralized when they come into Pennsylvania. I shall throw an overwhelming force on their advance, crush it, follow up the success, drive one corps back on another, and by successive repulses and surprises, before they can concentrate, create a panic and virtually destroy the army. [Then] the war will be over and we shall achieve the recognition of our independence.

In essence, Lee's strategy was identical to the one he employed in the Maryland campaign of 1862. After Chancellorsville he had supreme confidence in the men of his army, assuming they could handle any challenge he gave them. But elements of the Confederate government explored a different strategy. One faction wanted Lee to reduce Union pressure threatening the Confederate garrison at Vicksburg, Mississippi. After Chancellorsville, Lee met in Richmond on May 14-17 and then met again with Confederate President Jefferson Davis and his cabinet on May 26 to discuss strategy. After deliberations, Davis and the cabinet ultimately rejected the suggestion to divert troops towards Vicksburg and accepted Lee's argument for the value of a concentrated blow in the Northeast.

== Opposing forces ==
=== Confederate forces ===
Lee's movement started on the first of June and within a short time was well on its way through Maryland, with Union forces moving north along parallel lines. Lee's cavalry, under General Jeb Stuart, had the primary mission of gathering intelligence on where the enemy position was, but Stuart failed and instead raided some supply trains. He did not rejoin Lee until the battle was underway. Stuart had taken all Lee's best cavalry, leaving the main army with two third-rate, ill-equipped, poorly led brigades that could not handle the reconnaissance challenge in hostile country.

Stuart had taken the bulk of the cavalry on a counter-clockwise sweep near the coast behind the Union army and was out of contact with Lee for a week, depriving Lee of knowledge of the federal army. Trying to find Lee, he solved his intelligence problem by reading a Philadelphia newspaper that accurately reported Lee's location. The news was a day old, however, and Stuart, slowed down by a wagon train of booty, did not arrive at Gettysburg until July 2. The Confederates were often aided by uncensored newspaper reports of the movements of Union forces. Hooker tried to censor the newspapers, but reporters and editors evaded his restrictions and the South often had accurate reports of Union strength.

Lee's armies threatened Harrisburg, Washington, Baltimore and even Philadelphia. Local militia units hurriedly formed to oppose Lee, but they were inconsequential in the face of a large, battle-hardened attack force. When Lee finally got news of the approaching Federal army, he ordered his scattered forces to concentrate at Gettysburg, a crossroads junction in heavily wooded areas. Over three days, July 1–3, both armies arrived piecemeal; the Confederate forces from the north and northwest, while Union forces from the south and east. By July 1, Meade was to the south of Lee, cutting off his retreat and forcing him to fight.

=== Union forces ===
Joseph Hooker, commanding the Army of the Potomac, wanted to attack Richmond, but Lincoln vetoed that idea because - in his view - Hooker's goal should have been fighting and defeating the Confederacy's most important army in the field, Lee's Army of Northern Virginia. When Hooker demanded control of the garrison at Harper's Ferry or he would resign, Lincoln accepted and replaced Hooker with George Meade on June 28, just three days before the battle started. The new commander brooked no delay in chasing the rebels north.

Meade's advance was sluggish but was further advanced than Lee knew. Lee underestimated his new foe, expecting him to be easy to anticipate and slow to respond, much like Hooker. Meade wanted to defend further south, but when battle was joined at Gettysburg he hastened all corps there.

Taking advantage of interior lines, Meade was close behind Lee, and had cut off the line of retreat back to Virginia. Lee had to fight, but first he had to rush to reassemble his scattered forces at the crossroads town of Gettysburg before Meade defeated them piecemeal. Lee had 60,000 infantry and 10,200 cavalry (Meade's staff estimated Lee had 140,000). This time it was Lee's turn to be fooled; he gullibly accepted misinformation that suggested Meade had twice as many soldiers, when in fact he had 86,000.

Though the main Confederate army was marching through Pennsylvania, Lincoln was unable to give Meade more firepower. The vast majority of the 700,000 Federal soldiers were either tied down occupying Confederate territory, with Grant besieging Vicksburg, with Nathaniel P. Banks besieging Port Hudson, or with William S. Rosecrans maneuvering Braxton Bragg out of Middle Tennessee. Urgently the President called for 100,000 civilian militiamen to turn out for the emergency; being unorganized, untrained, unequipped and poorly led, they were more trouble than they were worth. When the battle began they broke and ran away.

== Campaign timeline ==
The battles of the Gettysburg Campaign were fought in the following sequence; they are described in the context of logical, sometimes overlapping divisions of the campaign.

Action	Dates	Section of campaign
Battle of Brandy Station	June 9, 1863	Brandy Station
Second Battle of Winchester	June 13–15	Winchester
Battle of Aldie	June 17	Hooker's pursuit
Battle of Middleburg	June 17–19	Hooker's pursuit
Battle of Upperville	June 21	Hooker's pursuit
Battle of Fairfax Court House	June 27	Stuart's ride
Skirmish of Sporting Hill	June 30	Invasion of Pennsylvania
Battle of Hanover	June 30	Stuart's ride
Battle of Gettysburg	July 1–3	Gettysburg
Battle of Carlisle	July 1	Stuart's ride
Battle of Hunterstown	July 2	Stuart's ride
Battle of Fairfield	July 3	Lee's retreat
Battle of Monterey Pass	July 4–5	Lee's retreat
Battle of Williamsport	July 6–16	Lee's retreat
Battle of Boonsboro	July 8	Lee's retreat
Battle of Funkstown	July 10	Lee's retreat
Battle of Manassas Gap	July 23	Lee's retreat

== Lee's advance to Gettysburg ==
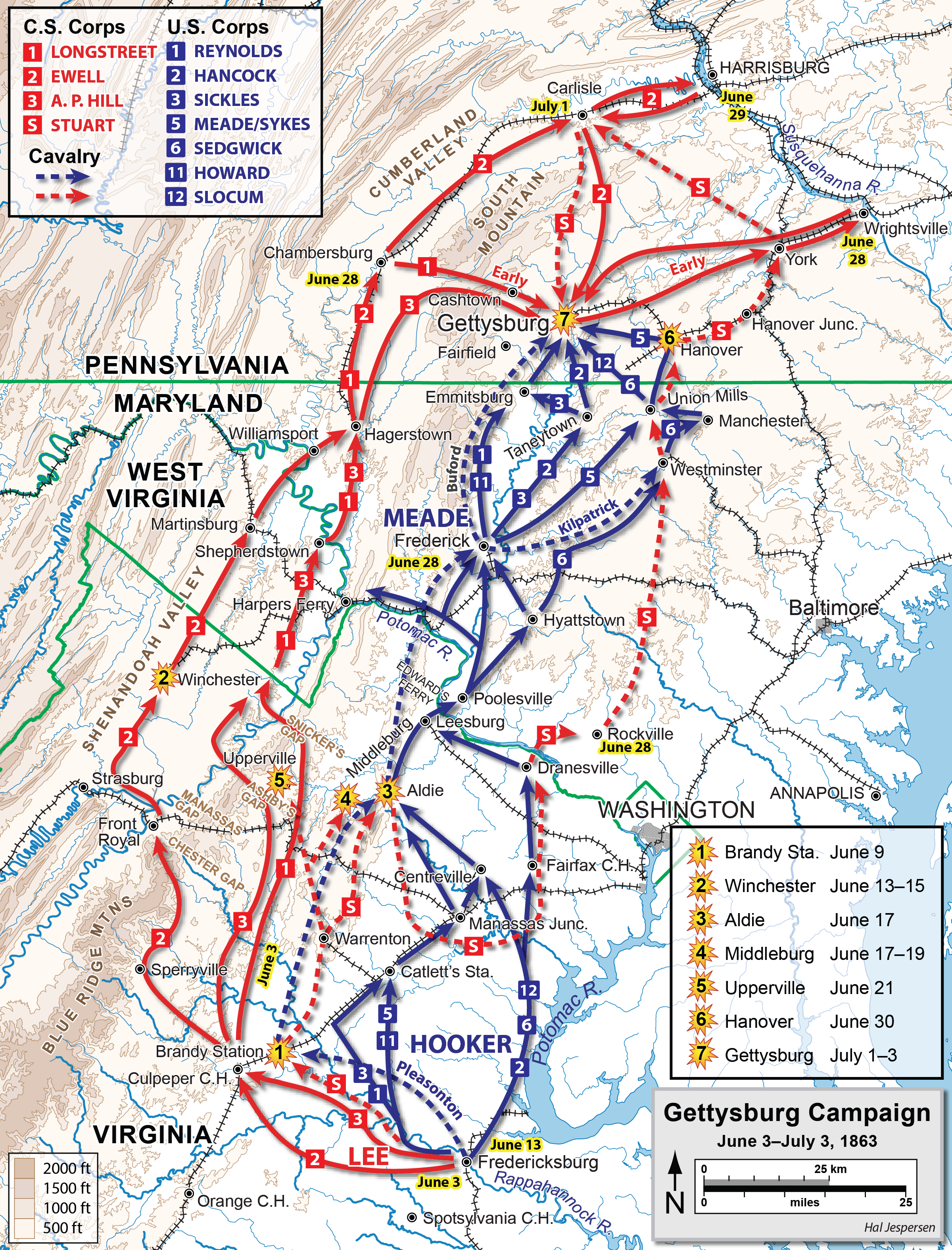
Gettysburg campaign (through July 3) Confederate Union Cavalry movements are shown with dashed lines.

On June 3, 1863, Lee's army began to slip away northwesterly from Fredericksburg, leaving A.P. Hill's Corps in fortifications above Fredericksburg to cover the departure of the army, protect Richmond from any Union incursion across the Rappahannock, and pursue the enemy if Hill thought it advantageous. (Note: In a letter to A.P. Hill, General Lee wrote: "I desire you to occupy the position of Fredericksburg with the troops under your command, making such disposition as will be best calculated to deceive the enemy, and keep him in ignorance of any change in the disposition of the army. Should the enemy make an advance upon you, you will endeavor to repel him, and, if not able to do so, or hold him in check, you must fall back along the line of the Fredericksburg Railroad, protecting your communications, and offering such resistance as you can to his advance toward Richmond. If you find it necessary, you can call up Pickett and Pettigrew, now at Hanover Junction. Should you find that the enemy has evacuated his position opposite you, you will, after informing yourself of the fact by your scouts, &c, if practicable and in your opinion advantageous, cross the river and pursue him, inflicting all the damage you can upon his rear.") By the following morning, Hooker's chief of staff, General Daniel Butterfield, had received various reports that at least a portion of the Confederate Army was moving. (Note: Letter to General Buford from General Butterfield, June 4, 1863 - 9.45 a.m.: Reports and appearances here indicate the disappearance of a portion of the enemy's forces from opposite our left. The general desires you to keep a sharp lookout, country well scouted, and advise as soon as possible of anything in your front or vicinity indicating a movement. Letter to General Meade from General Butterfield, June 4, 1863 - 10 a.m.: Balloon reports from Banks' Ford two camps disappeared and several batteries in motion. Balloon near Reynolds reports line of dust near Salem Church, and 20 wagons moving northerly on the Telegraph road.) The next day, June 5, Hooker canceled all leave and army furloughs and instructed that all troops be prepared to march if necessary. (Note: Circular - Headquarters Army of the Potomac, June 5, 1863 - 8:45 a.m.: The troops serving with this army will be held in readiness to move at very short notice. Three days' cooked rations will be kept on hand until further orders, and all surplus baggage will be sent to the rear today. Until otherwise directed, no more leaves of absence or furloughs will be granted, and all leaves and furloughs which have been given to take effect today, will at once be revoked.) In the meantime, Longstreet's and Ewell's corps were camped in and around Culpeper. With more Union reports intimating that Lee had moved a large portion of his army, Hooker ordered Sedgwick to conduct a reconnaissance in force across the Rappahannock River.

A small skirmish began shortly after 5:00 p.m. as Vermont and New Jersey troops, supported by a heavy Federal artillery bombardment, paddled across the river and overran Confederate positions on the southern bank. As a precaution, Lee temporarily halted Ewell's Corps, but when he saw that Hooker would not press the Fredericksburg line to bring on a battle, he ordered Ewell to continue. The same day as Federal troops crossed the river, General Buford wrote that he had received credible information that "all of the available cavalry of the Confederacy" was in Culpeper County. On June 7, George H. Sharpe, head of the Bureau of Military Information, erroneously reported to Hooker that, while J. E. B. Stuart was preparing a large cavalry raid, Lee's infantry would be withdrawing to Richmond. Hooker decided to preemptively attack the Confederate cavalry force in Culpeper and ordered Cavalry Corps commander Alfred Pleasonton to command the assault. (Note: "From the most reliable information at these headquarters, it is recommended that you cross the Rappahannock at Beverly and Kellys Fords, and march directly on Culpeper. For this you will divide your cavalry force as you think proper, to carry into execution the object in view, which is to disperse and destroy the rebel force assembled in the vicinity of Culpeper, and to destroy his trains and supplies of all description to the utmost of your ability.... It is believed that the enemy has no infantry. Should you find this to be the case, by keeping your troops well in hand, you will be able to make head in any direction.")

Lee rejoined the leading elements of his army in Culpeper on June 7 and ordered Albert G. Jenkins' cavalry to advance northward through the Shenandoah Valley. (Note: "I desire you to have your command ready to be concentrated at Strasburg or Front Royal, or any point in front of either, by Wednesday, the 10th instant, with a view to co-operate with a force of infantry. Your pickets can be kept in advance as far as you deem best, toward Winchester.") He also wrote to John D. Imboden and ordered him to attract Union forces in Hampshire County and to disrupt their communications and logistics as well as acquire cattle for use by the Confederate Army. (Note: "In view of operations in the Shenandoah Valley, I desire you to attract the enemy's attention in Hampshire County, and to proceed down to Romney or such other point as you may consider best calculated for the purpose. After leaving a sufficient guard on the Shenandoah Mountain, you can use the rest of your command for the purpose specified.... do them all the injury in your power by striking them a damaging blow at any point where opportunity offers, and where you deem most practicable. It will be important if you can accomplish it, to destroy some of the bridges, so as to prevent communication and the transfer of reinforcements to Martinsburg.... In connection with this purpose, it is important that you should obtain, for the use of the army, all the cattle that you can.") To support these movements, Lee wrote to General Samuel Jones and asked him to spare any troops that he could. (Note: "General Imboden's whole effective force, cavalry, infantry, and artillery, does not much exceed 1,300 men. I am anxious for him to get all the recruits he can in Hampshire and Hardy, and otherwise improve his efficiency. I do not know whether you have sent to General Jenkins all the cavalry you can spare. He has mentioned to me several regiments still behind, which he is desirous of obtaining, but not knowing whether you had enough for your purposes, I have delayed submitting to you his request.... I require now all the additional force I can get.") The following day, he wrote to James Seddon, Confederate Secretary of War, and attempted to persuade him to send troops currently in North Carolina to reinforce either his army or Confederate forces in the west. (Note: "As far as I can judge, there is nothing to be gained by this army remaining quietly on the defensive, which it must do unless it can be re-enforced.... I think our southern coast might be held during the sickly season by local troops, aided by a small organized force, and the predatory excursions of the enemy be repressed. This would give us an active force in the field with which we might hope to make some impression on the enemy, both on our northern and western frontiers.") On June 9, Lee ordered Stuart to cross the Rappahannock and raid Union forward positions, screening the Confederate Army from observation or interference as it moved north. Anticipating this imminent offensive action, Stuart ordered his troopers into bivouac around Brandy Station.

=== Brandy Station ===
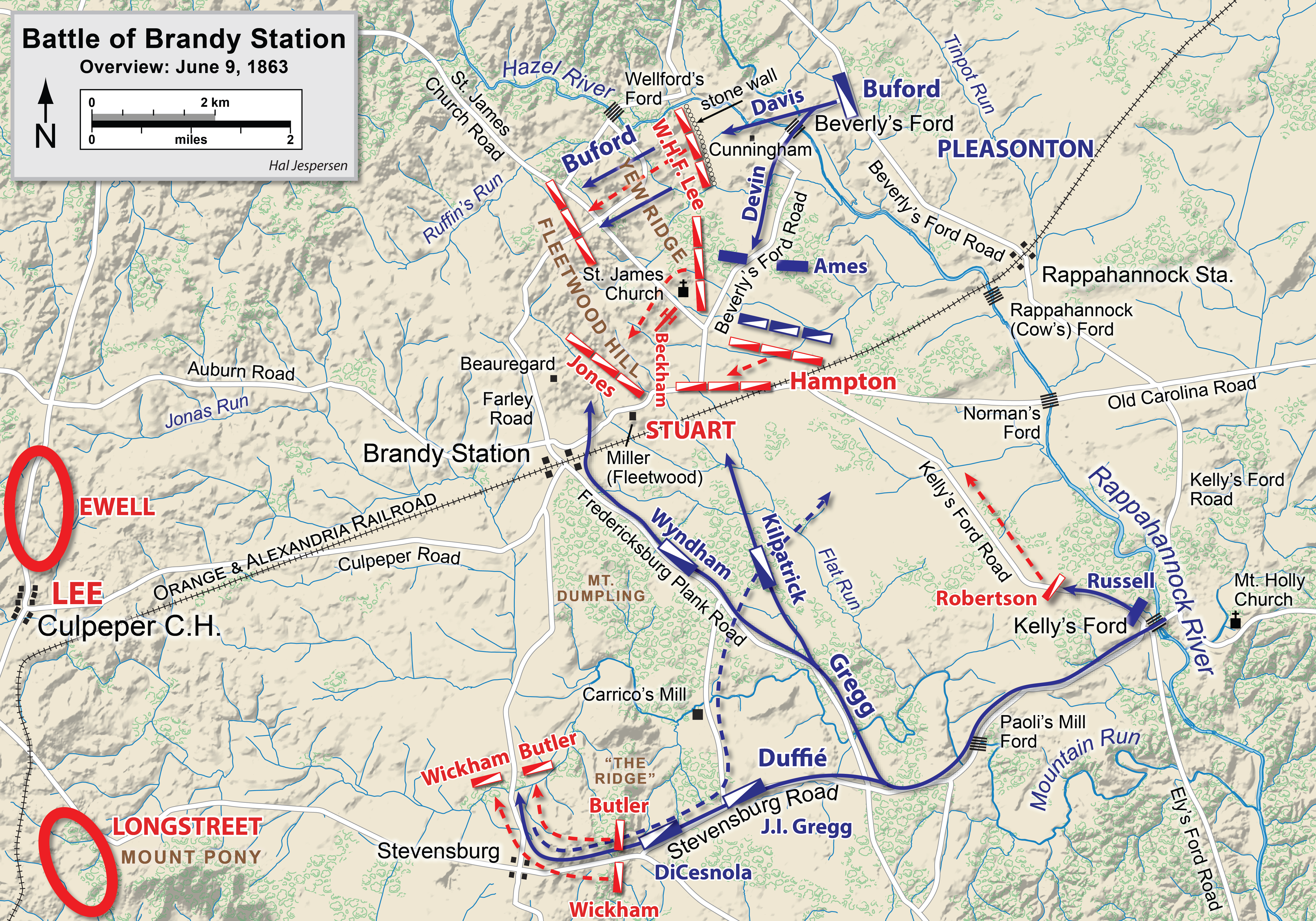
Overview of the Battle of Brandy Station

Alfred Pleasonton's combined arms force consisted of 8,000 cavalrymen and 3,000 infantry, while Stuart commanded about 9,500 Confederates. Pleasonton's attack plan called for a double envelopment of the enemy. The wing under Brigadier General John Buford would cross the river at Beverly's Ford, two miles (3 km) northeast of Brandy Station. At the same time, David McMurtrie Gregg's wing would cross at Kelly's Ford, six miles (10 km) downstream to the southeast. However, Pleasonton was unaware of the precise disposition of the enemy and he incorrectly assumed that his force was substantially larger than the Confederates he faced.

About 4:30 a.m. on June 9, Buford's column crossed the Rappahannock River and almost immediately encountered Confederate forces. After overcoming their shock at Buford's surprise attack, Confederate forces rallied and managed to check the Union force near St. James Church. Gregg's force, delayed in getting the leading force into position, finally attacked across Kelly's Ford at 9:00 a.m. Gregg's force divided once across the Rappahannock with one section attacking west toward Stevensburg and the second force pushing north to Brandy Station. Between Gregg and the St. James action was a prominent ridge called Fleetwood Hill, which had been Stuart's headquarters the previous night. Stuart, surprised a second time by Gregg's forces threatening his rear, sent regiments from St. James to check the Union advance in the south. When Gregg's men charged up the western slope and neared the crest, the lead elements of Grumble Jones' brigade rode over the crown.

For several hours there was desperate fighting on the slopes of the hill as many confusing charges and counter-charges swept back and forth. The section of Union troops sent to Stevensburg were bluffed into withdrawing and turned eastward to reinforce Gregg on Fleetwood Hill. Generals Lee and Ewell rode out to Brandy Station to observe the battle and Lee ordered infantry reinforcements under Robert E. Rodes moved within a mile of the battle, still concealed, in case the Union broke through Stuart's lines. Meanwhile, as Buford's forces at St. James began to make headway, Pleasonton ordered a withdrawal of all Union forces across the Rappahannock. As the threat to Confederate positions at Brandy Station lifted, Rodes withdrew his infantry back to their camp at Pony Mountain. By 9:00 p.m. all Union troops were across the river.

Brandy Station was the largest predominantly cavalry fight of the war, and the largest to take place on American soil. It was a tactical draw, although Pleasonton withdrew before finding the location of Lee's infantry nearby and Stuart claimed a victory, attempting to disguise the embarrassment of a cavalry force being surprised as it was by Pleasonton. The battle established the emerging reputation of the Union cavalry as a peer of the Confederate mounted arm.

=== Winchester ===
After Brandy Station, a variety of Union sources reported the presence of Confederate infantry at Culpeper and Brandy Station. (Note: Letter from General Pleasonton to General Butterfield, June 10, 1863 - 10:45 p.m.: Your second dispatch to-day just received. We did encounter infantry yesterday, both mounted and on foot. Those mounted are armed with rifles made at Fayetteville, and marked C. S. A. Some were captured. Infantry at Brandy Station jumped from the cars, and attacked Gregg's people... Letter from General Pleasonton to General Hooker, June 10, 1863 - 9 p.m.: Another contraband, who had been a servant to officers in Cobb's Legion, states that Generals R. E. Lee, Longstreet, A. P. Hill, and Ewell were at the review at Culpeper on Monday last. No infantry were on review, but five or six divisions of infantry were near there and Orange Court-House. They said they were going to issue rations for three days, and after that they were to ration themselves up in Pennsylvania (this was said to the cavalry). These rations were to be issued the day we went over there. There seems to be truth in this information.) Hooker did not immediately act on this information. The day after the battle, Ewell's Corps began marching toward the Shenandoah Valley. Lee intended Ewell to clear the valley of Federal forces while Longstreet's Corps marched east of the Blue Ridge Mountains. A.P. Hill would then march his corps through the valley as well. On June 12, the leading elements of Lee's army were passing through the Chester Gap.

At the same time, Hooker still believed that Lee's army was positioned on the west bank of the Rappahannock, between Fredericksburg and Culpeper and that it outnumbered his own. (Note: Letter from General Hooker to General Dix, June 12, 1863 - 1:30 p.m.: All of Lee's army, so far as I know, is extended along the immediate banks of the Rappahannock, from Hamilton's Crossing to Culpeper.... These bodies have been very much swollen in numbers of late, the enemy's divisions corresponding with our corps.... From my balloon it can be seen that he is daily receiving acquisitions. He has a numerical superiority over me.) Hooker had proposed to march on Richmond after the battle at Brandy Station, but Lincoln had replied that "Lee's army, not Richmond, is your true objective." Meanwhile, Ewell's Corps was passing Front Royal and approaching Winchester.

The Union garrison was commanded by Major General Robert H. Milroy and consisted of 6,900 troops posted in Winchester itself and a detachment of 1,800 men ten miles (16 km) east in Berryville, Virginia. The Union defenses consisted of three forts on high ground just outside the town. Milroy's tenure at Winchester had been marked by incivility toward the civilian population, who resented his oppressive rule, and the Confederate troops were eager to destroy his force. General-in-chief Henry Halleck did not want any Union force stationed in Winchester beyond what was necessary as an outpost to monitor Confederate movement and repeatedly ordered Milroy's superior, Maj. Gen. Robert C. Schenck of the Middle Department, to withdraw the surplus force to Harpers Ferry. (Note: General Halleck's telegram, June 11, 1863 - 12 p.m.: Harper's Ferry is the important place. Winchester is of no importance other than as a lookout. The Winchester troops, excepting enough to serve as an outpost, should be withdrawn to Harper's Ferry.... No large amount of supplies should be left in any exposed position.) Schenck, however, did not comply and, unaware that Lee's infantry were approaching, did not issue any orders for Milroy to withdraw immediately from Winchester before June 13. (Note: Gen. Schenck's adjutant, Lt. Col. Donn Piatt sent Milroy a message on June 11 advising him to "immediately take steps to remove your command from Winchester to Harper's Ferry." Gen. Milroy replied to this message that he had Winchester "well protected, and am prepared to hold it... and I can and would hold it, if permitted to do so, against any force the rebels can afford to bring against me..." Early on June 12, Gen. Schenck sent a reply to Milroy in which he claimed that Piatt had "misunderstood me" and ordered Milroy only to "make all the required preparations for withdrawing, but hold your position in the meantime. Be ready for movement but await further orders.") By then, Milroy's position was in extreme danger from a superior Confederate force.

Ewell planned to defeat the Union garrison by sending Allegheny Johnson and Jubal Early's divisions directly to Winchester while Rodes' division maneuvered east to defeat the Union detachment at Berryville and wheel north toward Martinsburg. These movements effectively surrounded the Federal garrison by 23,000 Confederate troops. On the 13th, Milroy's telegraph connection with Harpers Ferry and Washington was cut by Ewell's troops. The Berryville detachment escaped Rodes' division and fell back on Winchester while Rodes' men continued north to Martinsburg. Though Ewell was initially hesitant about assaulting the defenses at Winchester, Early discovered that there was an unguarded hill west of the fortifications that dominated the battlefield.

By 11 a.m. on June 14, Early began moving his forces covertly to take that position. To distract the Union, Ewell ordered demonstrations by John B. Gordon's brigade and the Maryland Line. At 6 p.m., Confederate artillery opened fire on the Union's West Fort and the brigade of Brig. Gen. Harry T. Hays led the charge that captured the fort and a Union battery. As darkness fell, Milroy belatedly decided to retreat from his two remaining forts.

Anticipating the movement, Ewell ordered Johnson to march northwest and block the Union escape route. At 3:30 a.m. on June 15, Johnson's column intercepted Milroy's on the Charles Town Road. Although Milroy ordered his men to fight their way out of the situation, when the Stonewall Brigade arrived just after dawn to cut the turnpike to the north, Milroy's men began to surrender in large numbers. Milroy escaped personally but the Second Battle of Winchester cost the Union about 4,450 casualties (4,000 captured) out of 7,000 engaged, while the Confederates lost only 250 of 12,500 engaged.

=== Hooker's pursuit ===
"Fighting Joe" Hooker did not know Lee's intentions, and Stuart's cavalry masked the Confederate army's movements behind the Blue Ridge effectively. He initially conceived the idea of reacting to Lee's absence by seizing unprotected Richmond, Virginia, the Confederate capital. But President Abraham Lincoln sternly reminded him that Lee's army was the true objective. His orders were to pursue and defeat Lee but to stay between Lee and Washington and Baltimore. On June 14, the Army of the Potomac departed Fredericksburg and reached Manassas Junction on June 16. Hooker dispatched Pleasonton's cavalry again to punch through the Confederate cavalry screen to find the main Confederate army, which led to three minor cavalry battles from June 17 through June 21 in the Loudoun Valley.

Pleasonton ordered David McM. Gregg's division from Manassas Junction westward down the Little River Turnpike to Aldie. Aldie was tactically important in that near the village the Little River Turnpike intersected both of the turnpikes leading through Ashby's Gap and Snickers Gap into the Valley. The Confederate cavalry brigade of Col. Thomas T. Munford was entering Aldie from the west, preparing to bivouac, when three brigades of Gregg's division entered from the east at about 4 p.m. on June 17, surprising both sides. The resulting Battle of Aldie was a fierce mounted fight of four hours with about 250 total casualties. Munford withdrew toward Middleburg.

While the fighting occurred at Aldie, the Union cavalry brigade of Col. Alfred N. Duffié arrived south of Middleburg in the late afternoon and drove in the Confederate pickets. Stuart was in the town at the time and managed to escape before his brigades under Munford and Beverly Robertson routed Duffié in an early morning assault on June 18. The primary action of the Battle of Middleburg occurred on the morning of June 19 when Col. J. Irvin Gregg's brigade advanced west from Aldie and attacked Stuart's line on a ridge west of Middleburg. Stuart repulsed Gregg's charge, counterattacked, then fell back to defensive positions one-half mile (800 m) to the west.

On June 21, Pleasonton again attempted to break Stuart's screen by advancing on Upperville, nine miles (14 km) to the west of Middleburg. The cavalry brigades of Irvin Gregg and Judson Kilpatrick were accompanied by infantry from Col. Strong Vincent's brigade on the Ashby's Gap Turnpike. Buford's cavalry division moved northwest against Stuart's left flank, but made little progress against Grumble Jones's and John R. Chambliss's brigades. The Battle of Upperville ended as Stuart conducted a fierce fighting withdrawal and took up a strong defensive position in Ashby's Gap.

After successfully defending his screen for almost a week, Stuart found himself motivated to begin the most controversial adventure of his career, Stuart's raid around the eastern flank of the Union Army.

Hooker's significant pursuit with the bulk of his army began on June 25, after he learned that the Army of Northern Virginia had crossed the Potomac River. He ordered the Army of the Potomac to cross into Maryland and concentrate at Middletown (Slocum's XII Corps) and Frederick (the rest of the army, led by Reynolds's advance wing—the I, III, and XI Corps).

=== The invasion of Pennsylvania ===
Lincoln issued a proclamation calling for 100,000 volunteers from four states to serve a term of six months "to repel the threatened and imminent invasion of Pennsylvania." Pennsylvania Governor Andrew Curtin called for 50,000 volunteers to take arms as volunteer militia; only 8,000 initially responded, and Curtin asked for help from the New York State Militia. Gov. Joel Parker of New Jersey also responded by sending troops to Pennsylvania. The War Department created two new departments, the Department of the Monongahela, (Note: It encompassed the portion of Pennsylvania, west of Johnstown and the Laurel Hill range, and portions of West Virginia and Ohio, with headquarters at Pittsburg.) commanded by Major General William T. H. Brooks, and the Department of the Susquehanna, (Note: Comprising the remaining portion of Pennsylvania, with headquarters, at Harrisburg) commanded by Major General Darius N. Couch, to coordinate defensive efforts in Pennsylvania.

Pittsburgh, Harrisburg, and Philadelphia were considered potential targets and defensive preparations were made. In Harrisburg, the state government removed its archives from the town for safekeeping. In much of southern Pennsylvania, the Gettysburg campaign became widely known as the "emergency of 1863". The military campaign resulted in the displacement of thousands of refugees from Maryland and Pennsylvania who fled northward and eastward to avoid the oncoming Confederates, and resulted in a shift in demographics in several southern Pennsylvania boroughs and counties.

Although a primary purpose of the campaign was for the Army of Northern Virginia to accumulate food and supplies outside of Virginia, Lee gave strict orders (General Order 72) to his army to minimize any negative impacts on the civilian population. Food, horses, and other supplies were generally not seized outright, although quartermasters reimbursing Northern farmers and merchants using Confederate money were not well received. Various towns, most notably York, Pennsylvania, were required to pay indemnities in lieu of supplies, under threat of destruction. During their invasion of Pennsylvania, Confederate troops abducted up to 1,000 African Americans (most of them free people of color with a few being fugitive slaves), all of whom were forcibly sent southwards and sold into slavery. Many of the abductions were carried out by Albert G. Jenkins' cavalry brigade.

Ewell's corps continued to push deeper into Pennsylvania, with two divisions heading through the Cumberland Valley to threaten Harrisburg, while Jubal Early's division of Ewell's Corps marched eastward over the South Mountain range, occupying Gettysburg on June 26 after a brief series of skirmishes with state emergency militia and two companies of cavalry. Early laid the borough under tribute but did not collect any significant quantities of supplies. Soldiers burned several railroad cars and a covered bridge, and they destroyed nearby rails and telegraph lines. The following morning, Early departed for adjacent York County.

The brigade of Brig. Gen. John B. Gordon of Early's division reached the Susquehanna on June 28, where militia guarded the 5,629-foot-long (1,716 m) covered bridge at Wrightsville. Gordon's artillery fire caused the well-fortified militiamen to retreat and burn the bridge. Confederate cavalry under the command of Brig. Gen. Albert G. Jenkins raided nearby Mechanicsburg on June 28 and skirmished with militia at Sporting Hill on the west side of Camp Hill on June 29. The Confederates then pressed on to the outer defenses of Fort Couch, where they skirmished with the outer picket line for over an hour, the northernmost engagement of the Gettysburg campaign. They later withdrew in the direction of Carlisle.

=== Stuart's raid ===
Jeb Stuart enjoyed the glory of circumnavigating an enemy army, which he had done on two previous occasions in 1862, during the Peninsula Campaign and at the end of the Maryland Campaign. It is possible that he had the same intention when he spoke to Robert E. Lee following the Battle of Upperville. He certainly needed to erase the stain on his reputation represented by his surprise and near defeat at the Battle of Brandy Station. The exact nature of Lee's order to Stuart on June 22 has been argued by the participants and historians ever since, but the essence was that he was instructed to guard the mountain passes with part of his force while the Army of Northern Virginia was still south of the Potomac and that he was to cross the river with the remainder of the army and screen the right flank of Ewell's Second Corps. Instead of taking a direct route north near the Blue Ridge Mountains, Stuart chose to reach Ewell's flank by taking his three best brigades (those of Wade Hampton, Fitzhugh Lee, and John R. Chambliss, the latter replacing the wounded W.H.F. "Rooney" Lee) between the Union army and Washington, moving north through Rockville to Westminster and on into Pennsylvania, hoping to capture supplies along the way and cause havoc near the enemy capital. Stuart and his three brigades departed Salem Depot at 1 a.m. on June 25.

Unfortunately for Stuart's plan, the Union army's movement was underway and his proposed route was blocked by columns of Federal infantry from Hancock's II Corps, forcing him to veer farther to the east than either he or General Lee had anticipated. This prevented Stuart from linking up with Ewell as ordered and deprived Lee of the use of his prime cavalry force, the "eyes and ears" of the army, while advancing into unfamiliar enemy territory.

Stuart's command reached Fairfax Court House, where they were delayed for half a day by the small but spirited Battle of Fairfax Court House (June 1863) on June 27, and crossed the Potomac River at Rowser's Ford at 3 a.m. on June 28. Upon entering Maryland, the cavalrymen attacked the C & O Canal, one of the major supply lines for the Army of the Potomac, capturing canal boats and cargo. They entered Rockville on June 28, also a key wagon supply road between the Union Army and Washington, tearing down miles of telegraph wire and capturing a wagon train of 140 brand new, fully loaded wagons and mule teams. This wagon train would prove to be a logistical hindrance to Stuart's advance, but he interpreted Lee's orders as placing importance on gathering supplies. The proximity of the Confederate raiders provoked some consternation in the national capital and Meade dispatched two cavalry brigades and an artillery battery to pursue the Confederates. Stuart supposedly told one of his prisoners from the wagon train that were it not for his fatigued horses "he would have marched down the 7th Street Road [and] took Abe & Cabinet prisoners."

Stuart had planned to reach Hanover, Pennsylvania, by the morning of June 28, but rode into Westminster, Maryland, instead late on the afternoon of June 29. Here his men clashed briefly with and overwhelmed two companies of the 1st Delaware Cavalry under Maj. Napoleon B. Knight, chasing them a long distance on the Baltimore road, which Stuart claimed caused a "great panic" in the city of Baltimore.

Meanwhile, Union cavalry commander Alfred Pleasonton ordered his divisions to spread out in their movement north with the army, looking for Confederates. Judson Kilpatrick's division was on the right flank of the advance and passed through Hanover on the morning of June 30. The head of Stuart's column encountered Kilpatrick's rear as it passed through town and scattered it. The Battle of Hanover ended after Kilpatrick's men regrouped and drove the Confederates out of town. Stuart's brigades had been better positioned to guard their captured wagon train than to take advantage of the encounter with Kilpatrick. To protect his wagons and prisoners, he delayed until nightfall and then detoured around Hanover by way of Jefferson to the east, increasing his march by five miles (8 km). After a 20-mile (32 km) trek in the dark, his exhausted men reached Dover on the morning of July 1, the same time that his Confederate infantry colleagues began to fight Union cavalrymen under John Buford at Gettysburg.

Leaving Hampton's Brigade and the wagon train at Dillsburg, Stuart headed for Carlisle, hoping to find Ewell. Instead, he found nearly 3,000 Pennsylvania and New York militia occupying the borough. After lobbing a few shells into town during the early evening of July 1 and burning the Carlisle Barracks, Stuart concluded the so-called Battle of Carlisle and withdrew after midnight to the south towards Gettysburg. The fighting at Hanover, the long march through York County with the captured wagons, and the brief encounter at Carlisle slowed Stuart considerably in his attempt to rejoin the main army.

Stuart and the bulk of his command reached Lee at Gettysburg the afternoon of July 2. He ordered Wade Hampton to take a position to cover the left rear of the Confederate battle lines. Hampton moved into position astride the Hunterstown Road four miles (6 km) northeast of town, blocking access for any Union forces that might try to swing around behind Lee's lines. Two brigades of Union cavalry from Judson Kilpatrick's division under Brig. Gens. George Armstrong Custer and Elon J. Farnsworth were probing for the end of the Confederate left flank. Custer attacked Hampton in the Battle of Hunterstown on the road between Hunterstown and Gettysburg, and Hampton counterattacked. When Farnsworth arrived with his brigade, Hampton did not press his attack, and an artillery duel ensued until dark. Hampton then withdrew towards Gettysburg to rejoin Stuart.

=== Dix's advance against Richmond ===
As Lee's offensive strategy became clear, Union general-in-chief Maj. Gen. Henry W. Halleck planned a countermove that could take advantage of the now lightly defended Confederate capital of Richmond. He ordered the Union Department of Virginia, two corps under Maj. Gen. John A. Dix, to move on Richmond from its locations on the Virginia Peninsula (around Yorktown and Williamsburg) and near Suffolk. However, Halleck made the mistake of not explicitly ordering Dix to attack Richmond. The orders were to "threaten Richmond, by seizing and destroying their railroad bridges over the South and North Anna Rivers, and do them all the damage possible." Dix, a well-respected politician, was not an aggressive general, but he eventually contemplated attacking Richmond despite the vagueness of Halleck's instructions.

On June 27, his men conducted a successful cavalry raid on Hanover Junction, led by Col. Samuel P. Spear, which defeated the Confederate regiment guarding the railroad junction, destroyed the bridge over the South Anna River and the quartermaster's depot, capturing supplies, wagons, and 100 prisoners including General Lee's son, Brig. Gen. W. H. F. "Rooney" Lee. On June 29, at a council of war, Dix and his lieutenants expressed concerns about their limited strength (about 32,000 men) and decided to limit themselves to threatening gestures. Confederate Maj. Gen. D. H. Hill wrote that the Union advance on Richmond was "not a feint but a faint." The net effect of the operation was primarily psychological, causing the Confederates to hold back some troops from Lee's offensive to guard the capital.

=== Meade assumes command ===
On the evening of June 27, Lincoln sent orders relieving Hooker. Hooker had argued with Halleck about defending the garrison at Harpers Ferry and petulantly offered to resign, which Halleck and Lincoln promptly accepted. George Meade, a Pennsylvanian who was commanding the V Corps, was ordered to assume command of the Army of the Potomac early on the morning of June 28 in Frederick, Maryland. Meade was surprised by the change of command order, having previously expressed his lack of interest in the army command. In fact, when an officer from Washington woke him with the order, he assumed he was being arrested for some transgression. Despite having little knowledge of what Hooker's plans had been or the exact locations of the three columns moving quickly to the northwest, Meade kept up the pace. He telegraphed to Halleck, in accepting his new command, that he would "Move toward the Susquehanna, keeping Washington and Baltimore well covered, and if the enemy is checked in his attempt to cross the Susquehanna or if he turns toward Baltimore, to give him battle."

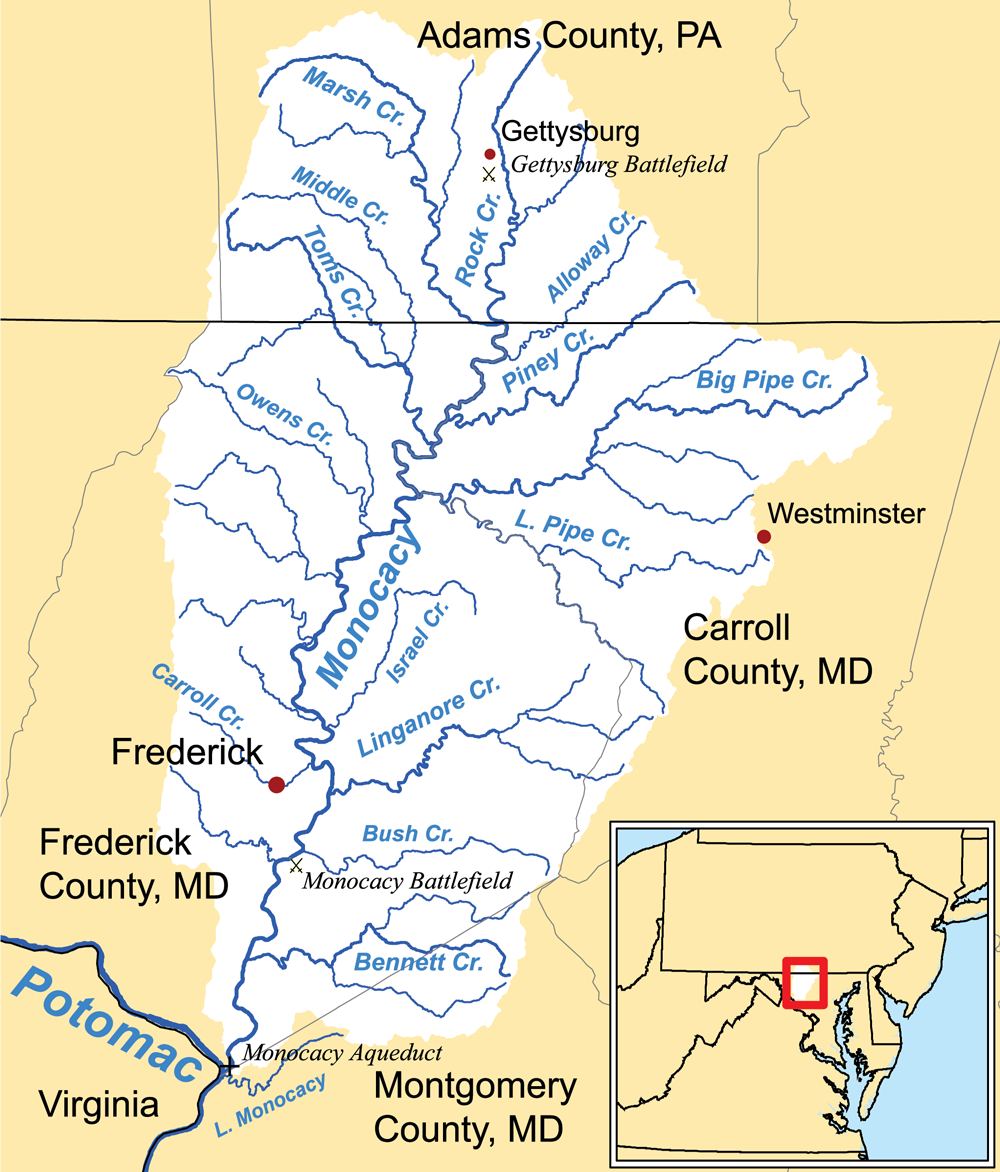
Map showing the position of Big Pipe Creek in relation to Gettysburg

On June 30, Meade's headquarters advanced to Taneytown, Maryland, and he issued two important orders. The first directed that a general advance in the direction of Gettysburg begin on July 1, a destination that was from 5 to 25 miles (8 to 40 km) away from each of his seven infantry corps. The second order, known as the Pipe Creek Circular, established a prospective line on Big Pipe Creek, which had been surveyed by his engineers as a strong defensive position. Meade had the option of occupying this position and hoping that Lee would attack him there; alternatively, it would represent a fall back position if the army got into trouble at Gettysburg.

=== Lee concentrates his army ===
The lack of Stuart's cavalry intelligence kept Lee unaware that his army's normally sluggish foe had moved as far north as it had. It was only after a spy hired by Longstreet, Henry Thomas Harrison, reported it that Lee found out his opponent had crossed the Potomac and was following him nearby. By June 29, Lee's army was strung out in an arc from Chambersburg (28 miles (45 km) northwest of Gettysburg) to Carlisle (30 miles (48 km) north of Gettysburg) to near Harrisburg and Wrightsville on the Susquehanna River. Ewell's Corps had almost reached the Susquehanna River and was prepared to menace Harrisburg, the Pennsylvania state capital. Early's Division occupied York, which was the largest Northern town to fall to the Confederates during the war. Longstreet and Hill were near Chambersburg.

Lee ordered a concentration of his forces around Cashtown, located at the eastern base of South Mountain and 8 miles (13 km) west of Gettysburg. On June 30, while part of Hill's Corps was in Cashtown, one of Hill's brigades, North Carolinians under Brig. Gen. J. Johnston Pettigrew, ventured toward Gettysburg. The memoirs of Maj. Gen. Henry Heth, Pettigrew's division commander, claimed that he sent Pettigrew to search for supplies in town—especially shoes.

When Pettigrew's troops approached Gettysburg on June 30, they noticed Union cavalry under Brig. Gen. John Buford arriving south of town, and Pettigrew returned to Cashtown without engaging them. When Pettigrew told Hill and Heth about what he had seen, neither general believed that there was a substantial Federal force in or near the town, suspecting that it had been only Pennsylvania militia. Despite Lee's order to avoid a general engagement until his entire army was concentrated, Hill decided to mount a significant reconnaissance in force the following morning to determine the size and strength of the enemy force in his front. Around 5 a.m. on Wednesday, July 1, two brigades of Heth's division advanced to Gettysburg.

== Battle of Gettysburg ==
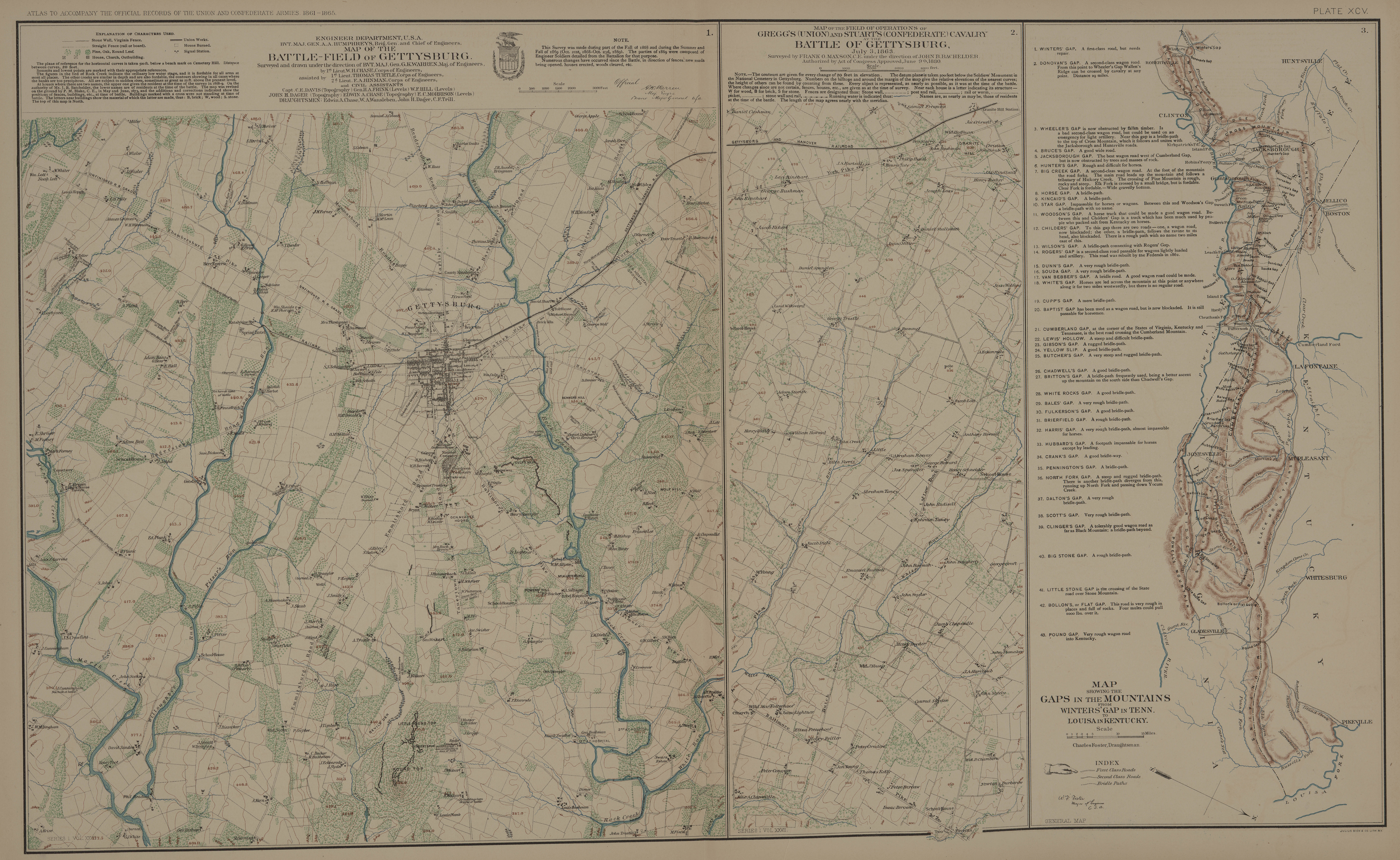
Battlefield of Gettysburg (1863)

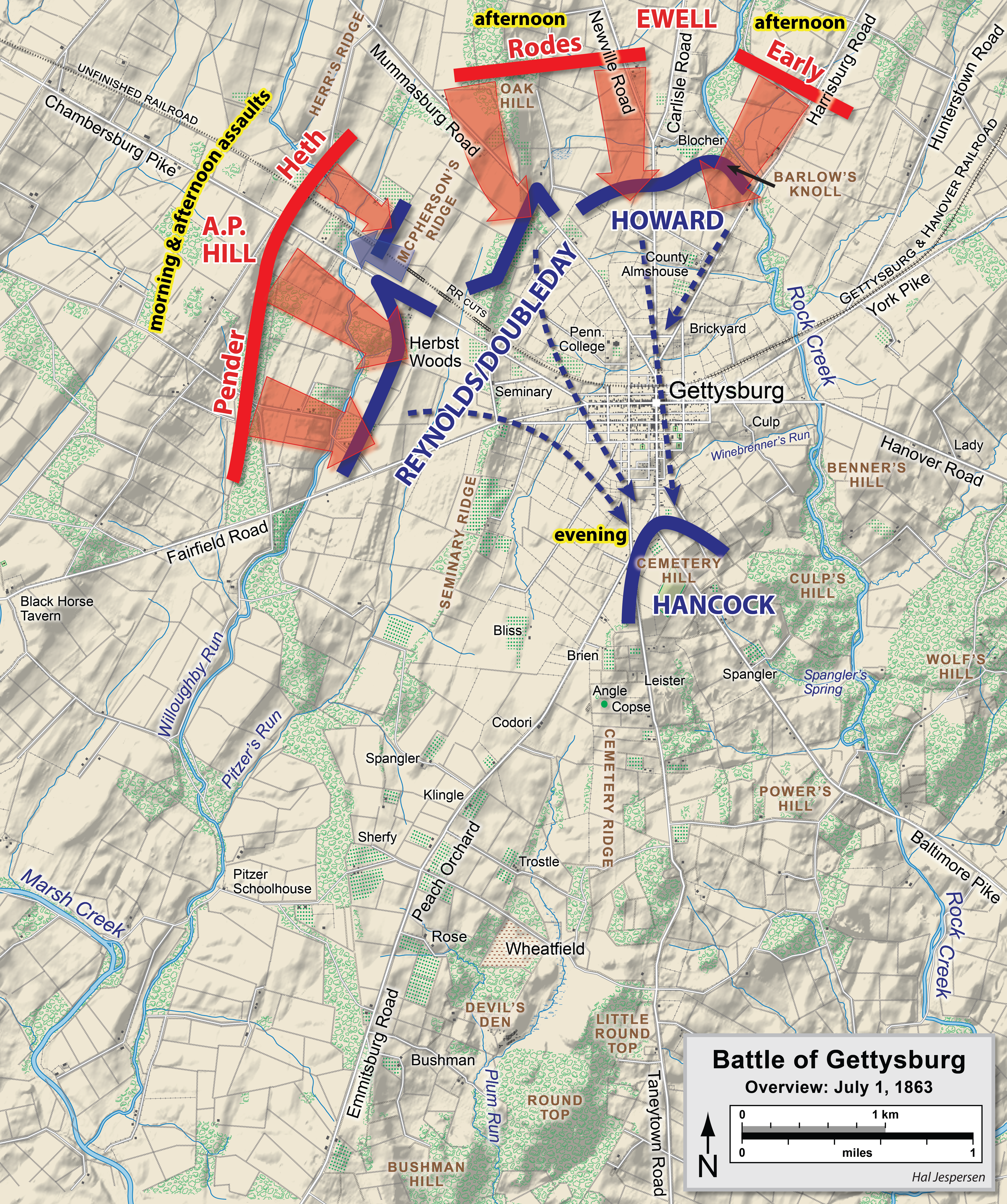
Battle of Gettysburg, July 1, 1863

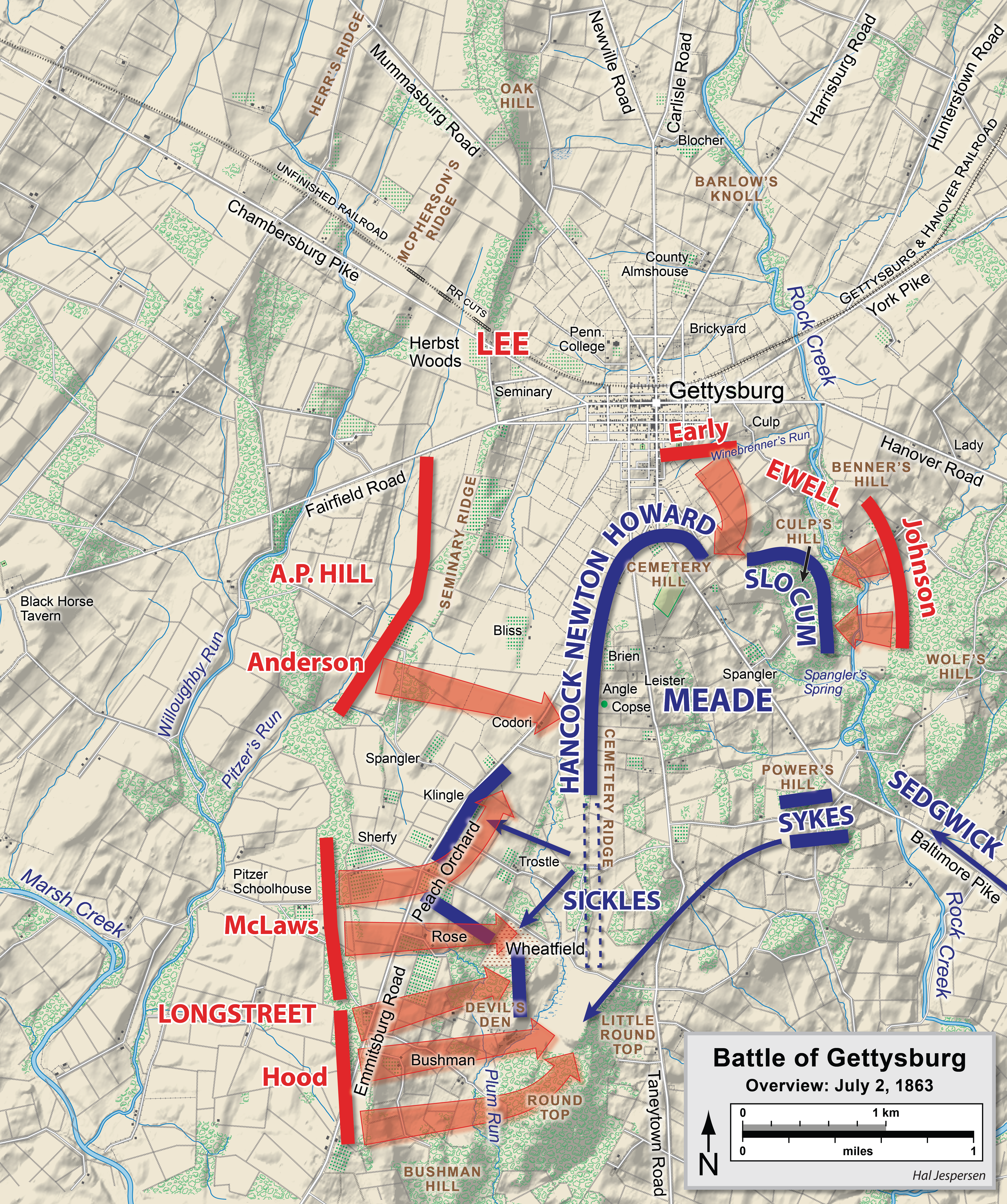
Battle of Gettysburg, July 2

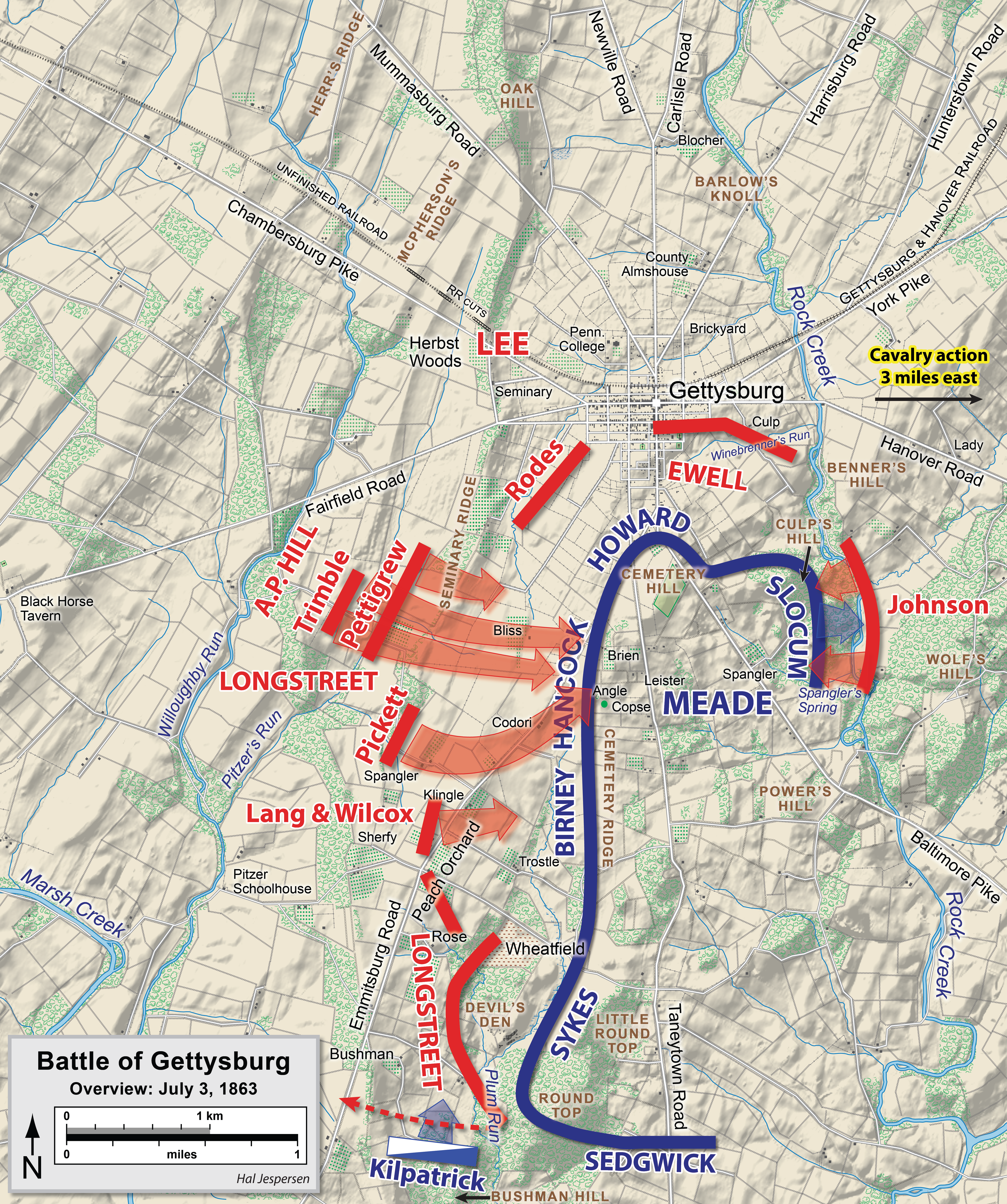
Battle of Gettysburg, July 3

The two armies began to collide at Gettysburg on July 1, 1863. The first day proceeded in three phases as combatants continued to arrive at the battlefield. In the morning, two brigades of Confederate Maj. Gen. Henry Heth's division (of Hill's Third Corps) were delayed by dismounted Union cavalrymen under Brig. Gen. John Buford. As infantry reinforcements arrived under Maj. Gen. John F. Reynolds from the I Corps, the Confederate assaults down the Chambersburg Pike were repulsed, although Gen. Reynolds was killed.

By early afternoon, the Union XI Corps had arrived, and the Union position was in a semicircle from west to north of the town. Ewell's Second Corps began a massive assault from the north, with Maj. Gen. Robert E. Rodes's division attacking from Oak Hill and Maj. Gen. Jubal A. Early's division attacking across the open fields north of town. The Union lines generally held under extremely heavy pressure, although the salient at Barlow's Knoll was overrun. The third phase of the battle came as Rodes renewed his assault from the north and Heth returned with his entire division from the west, accompanied by the division of Maj. Gen. W. Dorsey Pender.

Heavy fighting in Herbst's Woods (near the Lutheran Theological Seminary) and on Oak Ridge finally caused the Union line to collapse. Some of the Federals conducted a fighting withdrawal through the town, suffering heavy casualties and losing many prisoners; others simply retreated. They took up good defensive positions on Cemetery Hill and waited for additional attacks. Despite discretionary orders from Robert E. Lee to take the heights "if practicable," Richard Ewell chose not to attack. Historians have debated ever since how the battle might have ended differently if he had found it practicable to do so.

On the second day, Lee attempted to capitalize on his first day's success by launching multiple attacks against the Union flanks. After a lengthy delay to assemble his forces and avoid detection in his approach march, Longstreet attacked with his First Corps against the Union left flank. His division under Maj. Gen. John Bell Hood attacked Little Round Top and Devil's Den. To Hood's left, Maj. Gen. Lafayette McLaws attacked the Wheatfield and the Peach Orchard. Although neither prevailed, the Union III Corps was effectively destroyed as a combat organization as it attempted to defend a salient over too wide a front. Gen. Meade rushed as many as 20,000 reinforcements from elsewhere in his line to resist these fierce assaults. The attacks in this sector concluded with an unsuccessful assault by the Third Corps division of Maj. Gen. Richard H. Anderson against the Union center on Cemetery Ridge. That evening, Ewell's Second Corps turned demonstrations against the Union right flank into full-scale assaults on Culp's Hill and East Cemetery Hill, but both were repulsed. The Union army had occupied strong defensive positions, and Meade handled his forces well, resulting in heavy losses for both sides but leaving the disposition of forces on both sides essentially unchanged.

After attacks on both Union flanks had failed the day and night before, Lee was determined to strike the Union center on the third day. He decided to support this attack with a renewed thrust on the Union right that was supposed to start in concert with his assault on the center. However, the fighting on Culp's Hill resumed early in the morning with a Union counterattack, hours before Longstreet could begin his attack on the center. The Union troops on fortified Culp's Hill had been reinforced and the Confederates made no progress after multiple, futile assaults that lasted until noon. The infantry assault on Cemetery Ridge known as Pickett's Charge was preceded by a massive artillery bombardment at 1 p.m. that was meant to soften up the Union defense and silence its artillery, but it was largely ineffective. Approximately 12,500 men in nine infantry brigades advanced over open fields for three-quarters of a mile (1,200 m) under heavy Union artillery and rifle fire. Although some Confederates were able to breach the low stone wall that shielded many of the Union defenders, they could not maintain their hold and were repulsed with over 50% casualties.

During and after Pickett's Charge on the third day, two significant cavalry battles also occurred: one approximately three miles (5 km) to the east, in the area known today as East Cavalry Field, the other southwest of the [Big] Round Top mountain (sometimes called South Cavalry Field). The East Cavalry Field fighting was an attempt by Maj. Gen. J.E.B. Stuart's Confederate cavalry to get into the Federal rear and exploit any success that Pickett's Charge may have generated. Union cavalry under Brig. Gens. David McM. Gregg and George Armstrong Custer repulsed the Confederate advances. In South Cavalry Field, after Pickett's Charge had been defeated, reckless cavalry charges against the right flank of the Confederate Army, ordered by Brig. Gen. Judson Kilpatrick, were easily repulsed.

The three-day battle in and around Gettysburg resulted in the largest number of casualties in the American Civil War—between 46,000 and 51,000. In conjunction with the Union victory at Vicksburg on July 4, Gettysburg is frequently cited as the war's turning point.

== Lee's retreat to Virginia ==
Lee managed to escape back to Virginia after a harrowing forced march in the face of flooded rivers. Meade took the blame for the failure to capture Lee's highly vulnerable and outnumbered army.

Following Pickett's Charge, the Confederates returned to their positions on Seminary Ridge and prepared fortifications to receive a counterattack. When the Union attack had not occurred by the evening of July 4, Lee realized that he could accomplish nothing more in his campaign and that he had to return his battered army to Virginia. Lee started his Army of Northern Virginia in motion late the evening of July 4 towards Fairfield and Chambersburg. Cavalry under Brig. Gen. John D. Imboden was entrusted to escort the miles-long wagon train of supplies and wounded men that Lee wanted to take back to Virginia with him, using the route through Cashtown and Hagerstown to Williamsport, Maryland. Thousands of more seriously wounded soldiers were left behind in the Gettysburg area, along with medical personnel. However, despite casualties of over 20,000 men, including a number of senior officers, the morale of Lee's army remained high and their respect for the commanding general was not diminished by their reverses.

Unfortunately for the Confederate Army, however, once they reached the Potomac they found it difficult to cross. Torrential rains that started on July 4 flooded the river at Williamsport, making fording impossible. Four miles (6 km) downstream at Falling Waters, Union cavalry destroyed Lee's lightly guarded pontoon bridge on July 4. The only way to cross the river was a small ferry at Williamsport. The Confederates could potentially have been trapped, forced to defend themselves against Meade with their backs to the river.

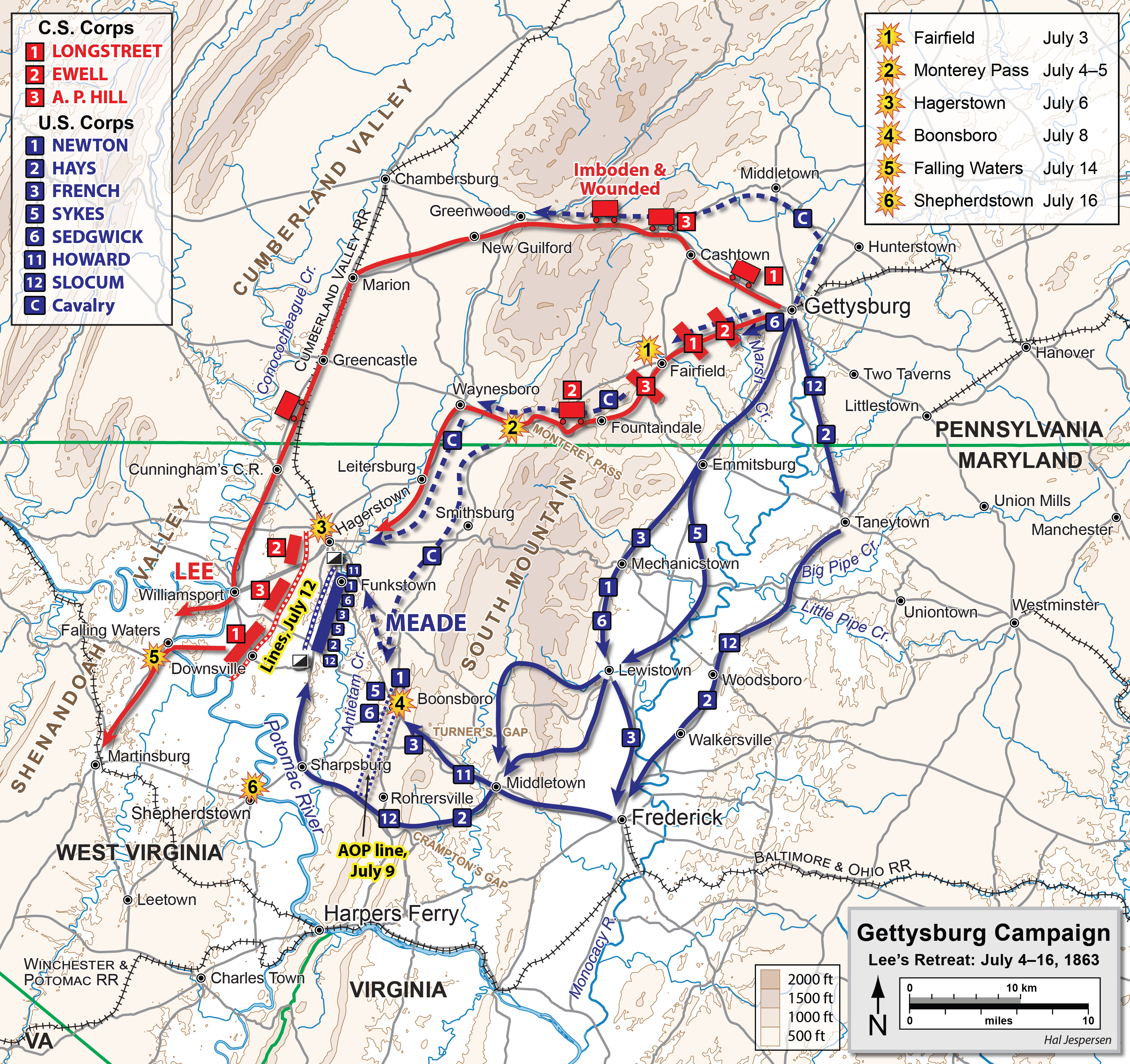
Gettysburg campaign (July 5–14)

The route of the bulk of Lee's army was through Fairfield and over Monterey Pass to Hagerstown. A small but important action that occurred while Pickett's Charge was still underway, the Battle of Fairfield, prevented the Union from blocking this route. Brig. Gen. Wesley Merritt's brigade departed from Emmitsburg with orders to strike the Confederate left and rear along Seminary Ridge. Merritt dispatched about 400 men from the 6th U.S. Cavalry to seize foraging wagons that had been reported in the area. Before they were able to reach the wagons, the 7th Virginia Cavalry, leading a column under Confederate Brig. Gen. William E. "Grumble" Jones, intercepted the regulars, but the U.S. cavalrymen repulsed the Virginians. Jones sent in the 6th Virginia Cavalry, which successfully charged and swarmed over the Union troopers. There were 242 Union casualties, primarily prisoners, and 44 casualties among the Confederates.

Imboden's journey was one of extreme misery, conducted during the torrential rains that began on July 4, in which the 8,000 wounded men had to endure the weather and the rough roads in wagons without suspensions. The train was harassed throughout its march. At dawn on July 5, civilians in Greencastle ambushed the train with axes, attacking the wheels of the wagons, until they were driven off. That afternoon at Cunningham's Cross Roads, Union cavalry attacked the column, capturing 134 wagons, 600 horses and mules, and 645 prisoners, about half of whom were wounded. These losses so angered Stuart that he demanded a court of inquiry to investigate.

Early on July 4 Meade sent his cavalry to strike the enemy's rear and lines of communication so as to "harass and annoy him as much as possible in his retreat." Eight of nine cavalry brigades (except Col. John B. McIntosh's of Brig. Gen. David McM. Gregg's division) took to the field. Col. J. Irvin Gregg's brigade (of his cousin David Gregg's division) moved toward Cashtown via Hunterstown and the Mummasburg Road, but all of the others moved south of Gettysburg. Brig. Gen. John Buford's division went directly from Westminster to Frederick, where they were joined by Merritt's division on the night of July 5.

Late on July 4, Meade held a council of war in which his corps commanders agreed that the army should remain at Gettysburg until Lee acted, and that the cavalry should pursue Lee in any retreat. Meade decided to have Brig. Gen. Gouverneur K. Warren take a division from Sedgwick's VI Corps to probe the Confederate line and determine Lee's intentions. By the morning of July 5, Meade learned of Lee's departure, but he hesitated to order a general pursuit until he had received the results of Warren's reconnaissance.

The Battle of Monterey Pass began as Brig. Gen. Judson Kilpatrick's cavalry division easily brushed aside Brig. Gen. Beverly Robertson's pickets and encountered a detachment of 20 men from the Confederate 1st Maryland Cavalry Battalion, under Capt. G. M. Emack, that was guarding the road to Monterey Pass. Aided by a detachment of the 4th North Carolina Cavalry and a single cannon, the Marylanders delayed the advance of 4,500 Union cavalrymen until well after midnight. Kilpatrick ordered Brig. Gen. George A. Custer to charge the Confederates with the 6th Michigan Cavalry, which broke the deadlock and allowed Kilpatrick's men to reach and attack the wagon train. They captured or destroyed numerous wagons and captured 1,360 prisoners – primarily wounded men in ambulances – and a large number of horses and mules.

As Meade's infantry began to march in pursuit of Lee on the morning of July 7, Buford's division departed from Frederick to destroy Imboden's train before it could cross the Potomac. At 5 p.m. on July 7 his men reached within one-half mile (800 m) of the parked trains, but Imboden's command repulsed their advance. Buford heard Kilpatrick's artillery in the vicinity and requested support on his right. Kilpatrick's men had moved toward Hagerstown and pushed out the two small brigades of Chambliss and Robertson. However, infantry commanded by Brig. Gen. Alfred Iverson drove Kilpatrick's men through the streets of town. Stuart's remaining brigades came up and were reinforced by two brigades of Hood's Division and Hagerstown was recaptured by the Confederates. Kilpatrick chose to respond to Buford's request for assistance and join the attack on Imboden at Williamsport. Stuart's men pressured Kilpatrick's rear and right flank from their position at Hagerstown and Kilpatrick's men gave way and exposed Buford's rear to the attack. Buford gave up his effort when darkness fell.

Lee's rearguard cavalry clashed with Federal cavalry in the South Mountain passes in the Battle of Boonsboro on July 8, delaying Union pursuit. In the Battle of Funkstown on July 10, Stuart's cavalry continued its efforts to delay Federal pursuit in an encounter near Funkstown, Maryland, which resulted in nearly 500 casualties on both sides. The fight also marked the first time since the Battle of Gettysburg that Union infantry engaged Confederate infantry in the same engagement. Stuart was successful in delaying Pleasonton's cavalry for another day.

By July 9 most of the Army of the Potomac was concentrated in a five-mile (8 km) line from Rohrersville to Boonsboro. Other Union forces were in position to protect the outer flanks at Maryland Heights and at Waynesboro. By July 11 the Confederates occupied a six-mile (10 km), highly fortified line on high ground with their right resting on the Potomac River near Downsville and the left about 1.5 miles (2.4 km) southwest of Hagerstown, covering the only road from there to Williamsport.

Meade telegraphed to general-in-chief Henry W. Halleck on July 12 that he intended to attack the next day, "unless something intervenes to prevent it." He once again called a council of war with his subordinates on the night of July 12, which resulted in a postponement of an attack until reconnaissance of the Confederate position could be performed, which Meade conducted the next morning. By that time, Lee became frustrated waiting for Meade to attack him and was dismayed to see that the Federal troops were digging entrenchments of their own in front of his works. Confederate engineers had completed a new pontoon bridge over the Potomac, which had also subsided enough to be forded. Lee ordered a retreat to start after dark, with Longstreet's and Hill's corps and the artillery to use the pontoon bridge at Falling Waters and Ewell's corps to ford the river at Williamsport.

On the morning of July 14, advancing Union skirmishers found that the entrenchments were empty. Cavalry under Buford and Kilpatrick attacked the rearguard of Lee's army, Maj. Gen. Henry Heth's division, which was still on a ridge about 1.5 miles (2.4 km) from Falling Waters. The initial attack caught the Confederates by surprise after a long night with little sleep, and hand-to-hand fighting ensued. Kilpatrick attacked again and Buford struck them in their right and rear. Heth's and Pender's divisions lost numerous prisoners. Brig. Gen. J. Johnston Pettigrew, who had survived Pickett's Charge with a minor hand wound, was mortally wounded at Falling Waters. This minor success against Heth did not make up for the extreme frustration in the Lincoln administration about allowing Lee to escape. The president was quoted as saying, "We had them within our grasp. We had only to stretch forth our hands and they were ours. And nothing I could say or do could make the Army move."

The two armies did not take up positions across from each other on the Rappahannock River for almost two weeks. On July 16 the cavalry brigades of Fitzhugh Lee and Chambliss held the fords on the Potomac at Shepherdstown to prevent crossing by the Federal infantry. The cavalry division under David Gregg approached the fords and the Confederates attacked them, but the Union cavalrymen held their position until dark before withdrawing.

The Army of the Potomac crossed the Potomac River at Harpers Ferry and Berlin (now named Brunswick) on July 17–18. They advanced along the east side of the Blue Ridge Mountains, trying to interpose themselves between Lee's army and Richmond. On July 23, in the Battle of Manassas Gap, Meade ordered French's III Corps to cut off the retreating Confederate columns at Front Royal, by forcing passage through Manassas Gap. At first light, French began slowly pushing the Stonewall Brigade back into the gap. About 4:30 p.m., a strong Union attack drove the Confederates until they were reinforced by Maj. Gen. Robert E. Rodes's division and artillery. By dusk, the poorly coordinated Union attacks were abandoned. During the night, Confederate forces withdrew into the Luray Valley. On July 24, the Union army occupied Front Royal, but Lee's army was safely beyond pursuit.

== Aftermath ==
The Gettysburg campaign represented the final major offensive by Robert E. Lee in the Civil War. Afterward, all combat operations of the Army of Northern Virginia were in reaction to Union initiatives. Lee suffered over 27,000 casualties during the campaign, a price very difficult for the Confederacy to pay. The campaign met only some of its major objectives: it had disrupted Union plans for a summer campaign in Virginia, temporarily protecting the citizens and economy of that state, and it had allowed Lee's men to live off the bountiful Maryland and Pennsylvania countryside and plunder vast amounts of food and supplies that they carried back with them and that would allow them to continue the war. However, the myth of Lee's invincibility had been shattered and not a single Union soldier was removed from the Vicksburg Campaign to react to Lee's invasion of the North. (Vicksburg surrendered on July 4, the day Lee ordered his retreat.) Union campaign casualties were approximately 30,100.

Meade was severely criticized for allowing Lee to escape, just as Maj. Gen. George B. McClellan had been after the Battle of Antietam. Under pressure from Lincoln, he launched two campaigns in the fall of 1863—Bristoe and Mine Run—that attempted to defeat Lee. Both were failures. He also suffered humiliation at the hands of his political enemies in front of the Joint Congressional Committee on the Conduct of the War, questioning his actions at Gettysburg and his failure to defeat Lee during the retreat to the Potomac. Nevertheless, Meade would remain in command of the Army of the Potomac for the rest of the war, although he would effectively lose strategic control of it after Ulysses S. Grant was appointed general-in-chief of the Union armies and set his headquarters with Meade's army, directly supervising him.

On November 19, 1863, Abraham Lincoln spoke at the dedication ceremonies for the national cemetery created at the Gettysburg battlefield. His Gettysburg Address redefined the war, calling for a "new birth of freedom" in the nation, which established the destruction of slavery as an implied goal.

== See also ==
- List of Medal of Honor recipients for the Gettysburg Campaign
- Attacks on the United States
