= S. B. Brodbeck Housing =

Historic houses in Pennsylvania, United States

- U.S. National Register of Historic Places
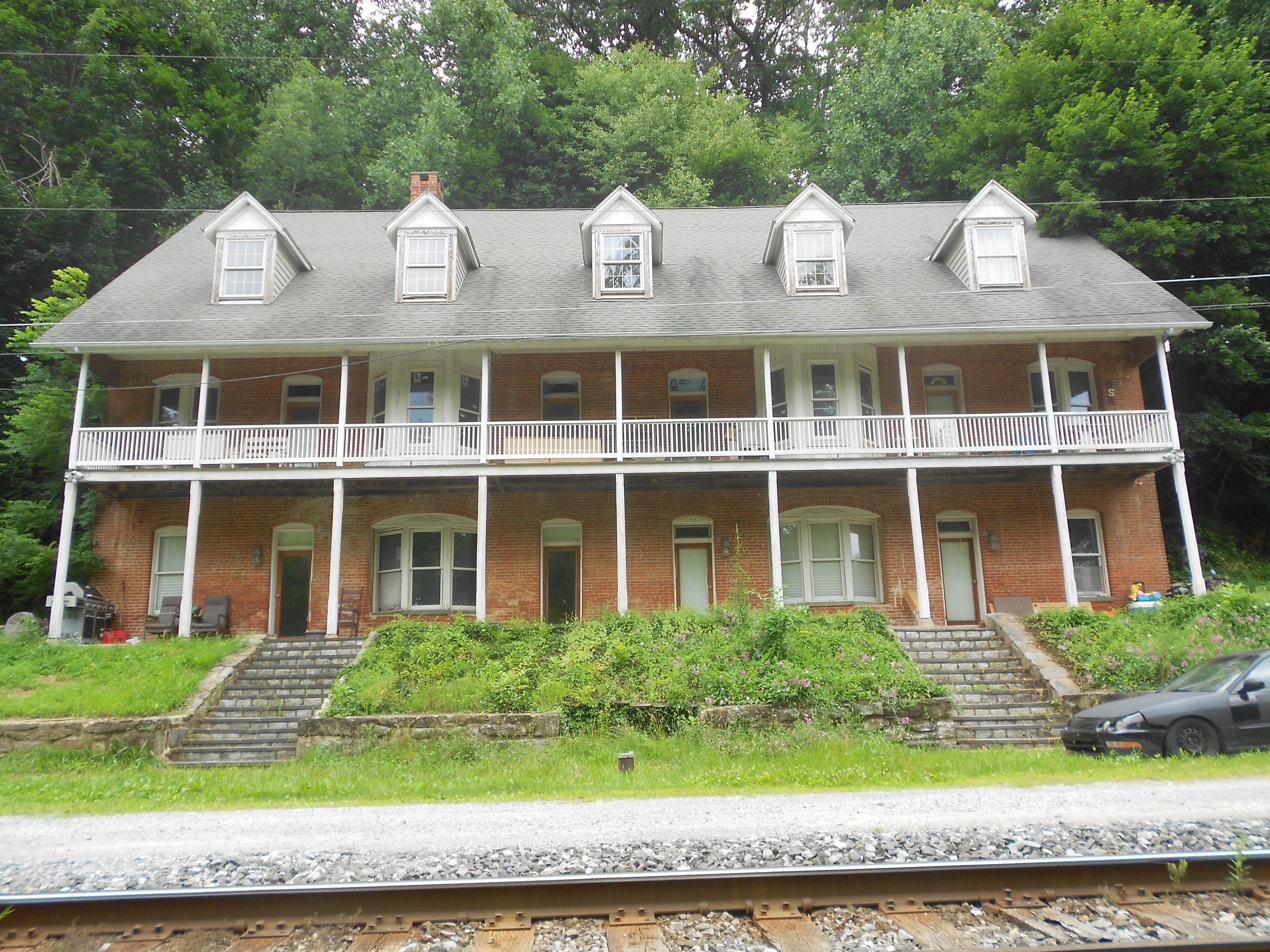

- Location within Pennsylvania Location within the United States
- Location: Main Street in Brodbecks, Codorus Township, Pennsylvania
- Coordinates: 39°46′13″N 76°49′39″W
- Area: less than one acre
- Built: 1890–1891
- Architectural style: Second Empire, Mansard rowhouse
- NRHP reference No.: 90001413
- Added to NRHP: September 6, 1990

S. B. Brodbeck Housing, also known as The Brick House, is a set of four historic rowhouses located at Codorus Township, Pennsylvania, York County, Pennsylvania. It was built in 1890–1891, and is a three-story, plus attic, brick building. It has a mansard roof with a fish-scale slate pattern in the Second Empire-style. The row measures 73 feet wide and 29 feet deep. It features a full-length two-story front porch and balcony, with an intricate railing and post bracket pattern. It was built by locally prominent Samuel B. Brodbeck.

It was added to the National Register of Historic Places in 1990.
