= Natalie Dagwell =

American entertainer

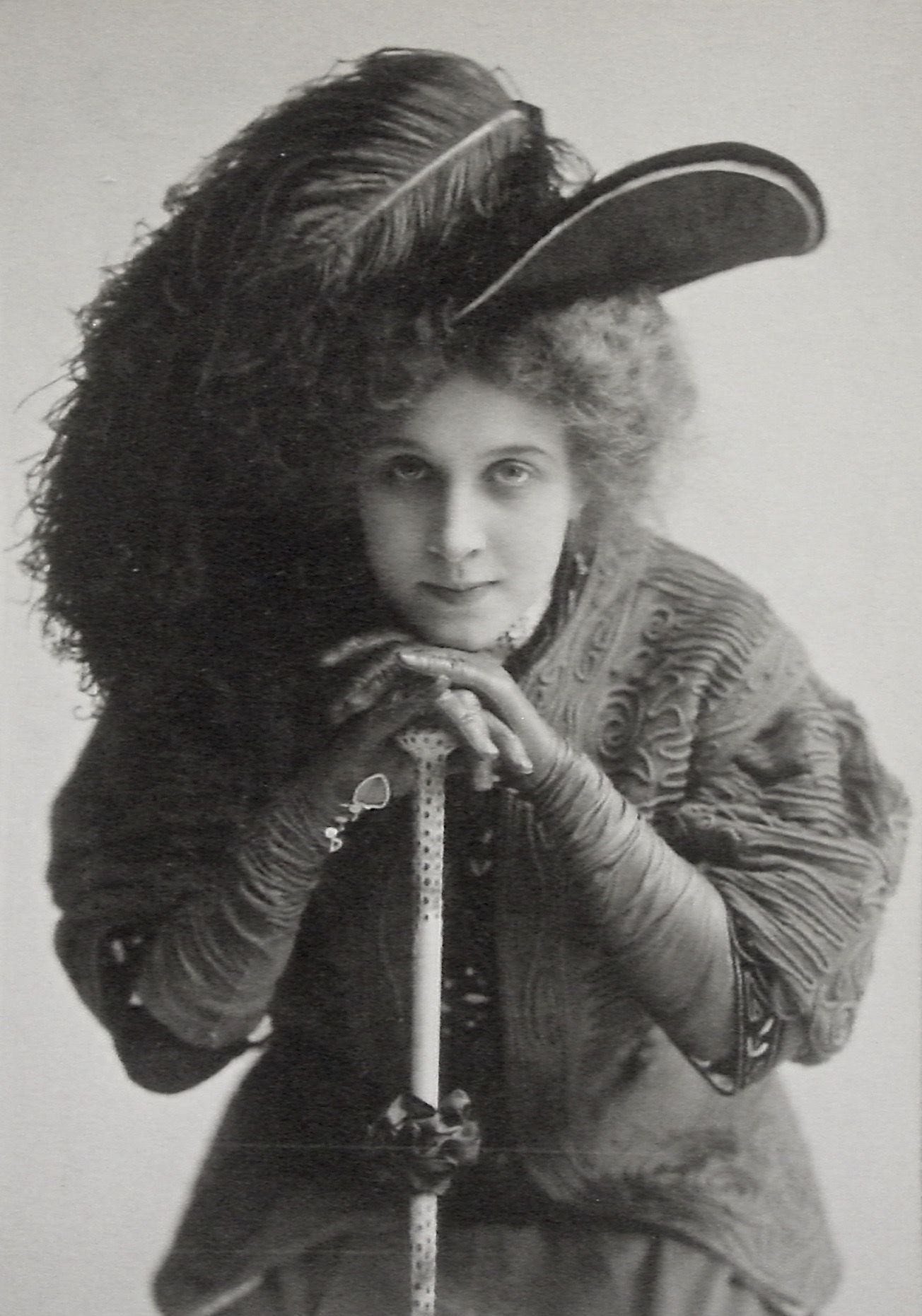
- Dagwell, c. 1919
- Born: Henrietta Emma Dagwell; September 11, 1886; Utica, New York, U.S.
- Died: July 7, 1965; Middleville, New York, U.S.
- Other names: Nathalie Dagwell
- Occupation(s): Singer, dancer, vaudeville and burlesque performer

Henrietta Emma "Natalie" Dagwell (September 11, 1886 – July 7, 1965) was an American singer, dancer, vaudeville and burlesque performer in the early 1900s.

== Biography ==
Dagwell was born in Utica, New York, the daughter of Charles Miller Dagwell and Barbara J. Dishler Dagwell. Her father was a policeman, and a Union Army and Union Navy veteran of the American Civil War. Her uncle George Albert Dagwell was wounded and captured at the Battle of Fairfax Court House in 1863. She trained as a singer with Frieda Ashworth, Melanie Guttman-Rice, and Victor Maurel. Dagwell died in 1965, at the age of 78, in Middleville, New York.

== Career ==
Dagwell's Broadway credits included roles in Dream City (1906–1907), Fascinating Flora (1907), The Merry Widow Burlesque (1908), A Winsome Widow (1912), Ziegfeld Follies of 1912 (1912–1913), The Big Show (1916–1917). She had a vaudeville act singing old songs with her older sister, Aurie Dagwell. Both Dagwell sisters were in the cast of A Black Sheep (1911) with the Edward F. Albee Stock Co. Léon Bakst designed a costume for Natalie Dagwell in 1916.

Dagwell was associated with the New York Hippodrome for many years. She sang early American songs in her act there in 1909. In 1917 Dagwell played "Miss Columbia" in a patriotic pageant at the Hippodrome. She was in Cheer Up at the Hippodrome in 1918. She was one of the chorus girls who raised funds for a memorial to the dogs who died in military testing during World War I.
