= Darwell =

Darwell is a name found as a given name, a surname, and a place name.

== People named Darwell ==
- Jane Darwell (1879–1967), American actress
- Joe Darwell (1891–1953), British rugby player
- John Darwell (born 1955, British photographer
- Darwell Stone (1859–1941), British theologian

== Places ==
- Darwell, Alberta
- Darwell Reservoir
- Darwell Wood

== See also ==
- Dagwell
- Darrell
- Dowell
- Darwin (surname)
