= Jefferson, York County, Pennsylvania =

Borough in Pennsylvania, US

Jefferson, Pennsylvania Codorus
- Borough
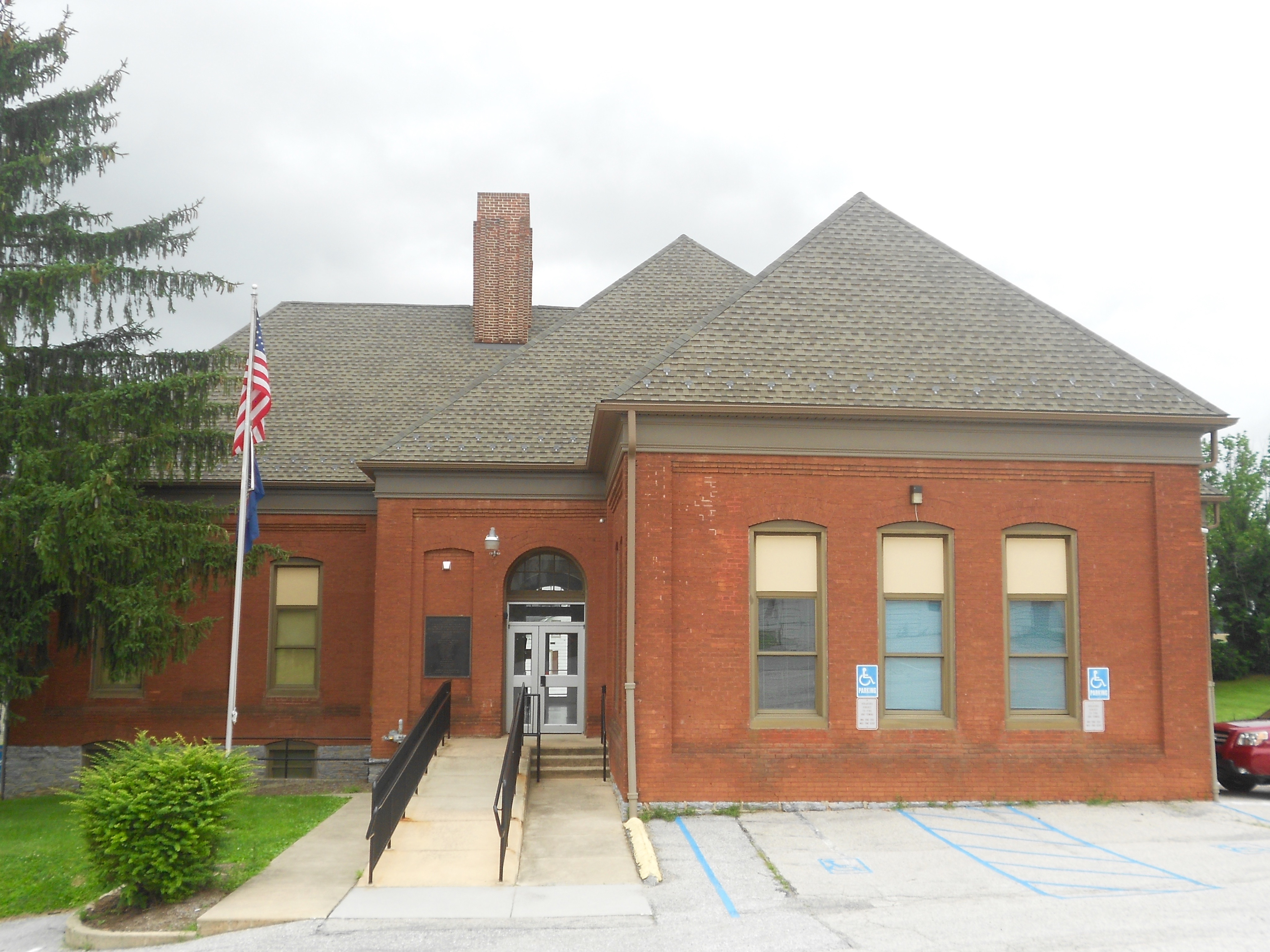
- Borough Hall

- Location in York County and the state of Pennsylvania.

- Location of Jefferson in Pennsylvania Jefferson (the United States)
- Coordinates: 39°49′00″N 76°50′30″W
- Country: United States
- State: Pennsylvania
- County: York
- Settled: 1812
- Incorporated: 1866

Government
  - Type: Borough Council
  - Mayor: Kelsey Hoke

Area
  - Total: 0.61 sq mi (1.57 km^{2})
  - Land: 0.61 sq mi (1.57 km^{2})
  - Water: 0 sq mi (0.00 km^{2})
- Elevation: 656 ft (200 m)

Population (2020)
  - Total: 658
  - Density: 1,085.2/sq mi (419.01/km^{2})
- Time zone: UTC-5 (Eastern (EST))
  - Summer (DST): UTC-4 (EDT)
- ZIP code: 17311
- Area code: 717
- FIPS code: 42-37944
- GNIS feature ID: 1215750
- Website: www.jeffersonboro.net

Jefferson is a borough in York County, Pennsylvania, United States. The population was 655 at the time of the 2020 census. It is part of the York–Hanover metropolitan area.

The name of the post office serving Jefferson is Codorus.

== Geography ==
Jefferson is located at 39°49′00″N 76°50′30″W. The town was named for Thomas Jefferson.

According to the United States Census Bureau, the borough has a total area of 0.6 square miles (1.6 km^{2}), all land.

== Demographics ==
Historical population
Census	Pop.	Note	%±
1850	164		—
1860	204		24.4%
1870	327		60.3%
1880	320		−2.1%
1890	374		16.9%
1900	374		0.0%
1910	347		−7.2%
1920	514		48.1%
1930	423		−17.7%
1940	400		−5.4%
1950	449		12.3%
1960	447		−0.4%
1970	540		20.8%
1980	685		26.9%
1990	675		−1.5%
2000	631		−6.5%
2010	733		16.2%
2020	655		−10.6%
2021 (est.)	654		−0.2%

As of the census of 2000, there were 631 people, 253 households, and 191 families residing in the borough. The population density was 1,036.4 inhabitants per square mile (400.2/km^{2}). There were 261 housing units at an average density of 428.7 units per square mile (165.5 units/km^{2}).

The racial makeup of the borough was 99.52% White, 0.16% African American, and 0.32% from two or more races. Hispanic or Latino of any race were 0.32% of the population.

There were 253 households, out of which 30.8% had children under the age of 18 living with them; 64.4% were married couples living together, 9.1% had a female householder with no husband present, and 24.5% were non-families. 22.5% of all households were made up of individuals, and 10.3% had someone living alone who was 65 years of age or older. The average household size was 2.49 and the average family size was 2.92.

In the borough the population was spread out, with 24.1% under the age of 18, 7.4% from 18 to 24, 26.6% from 25 to 44, 28.2% from 45 to 64, and 13.6% who were 65 years of age or older. The median age was 39 years. For every 100 females there were 105.5 males. For every 100 females age 18 and over, there were 102.1 males.

The median income for a household in the borough was $43,542, and the median income for a family was $49,028. Males had a median income of $37,313 versus $27,031 for females. The per capita income for the borough was $19,070. About 1.1% of families and 1.7% of the population were below the poverty line, including none of those under age 18 and 5.4% of those age 65 or over.

== Fire protection ==
Jefferson Borough is served by the Jefferson Volunteer Fire Company (Station 47) as well as the surrounding mutual aid departments, including Spring Grove Fire Department, North Codorus Fire Department, Seven Valleys Fire Department, Porters Community Fire Company, and Lineboro Fire Department (MD).

== Emergency Medical Services ==
Jefferson is primarily covered by Spring Grove Ambulance service, which occasionally has Advanced Life Support (ALS) capabilities for EMS needs. The Jefferson Volunteer Fire Company also has a Quick Response Service (QRS), that responds to provide Basic Life Support (BLS) care to patients until the arrival of a transport unit.

Other organizations that may provide EMS to this jurisdiction if Spring Grove is unavailable, including when they lack ALS coverage, includes the Lineboro Volunteer Fire Department (ALS), Community LifeTeam EMS, Pleasant Hill Fire Company (BLS), and other surrounding organizations.

Closest hospitals include UPMC Hanover Hospital, Wellspan York Hospital, and UPMC Memorial Hospital.
