= Fight at Monterey Pass =

Battle of the American Civil War

Fight at Monterey Pass (Gap)
- Part of the American Civil War
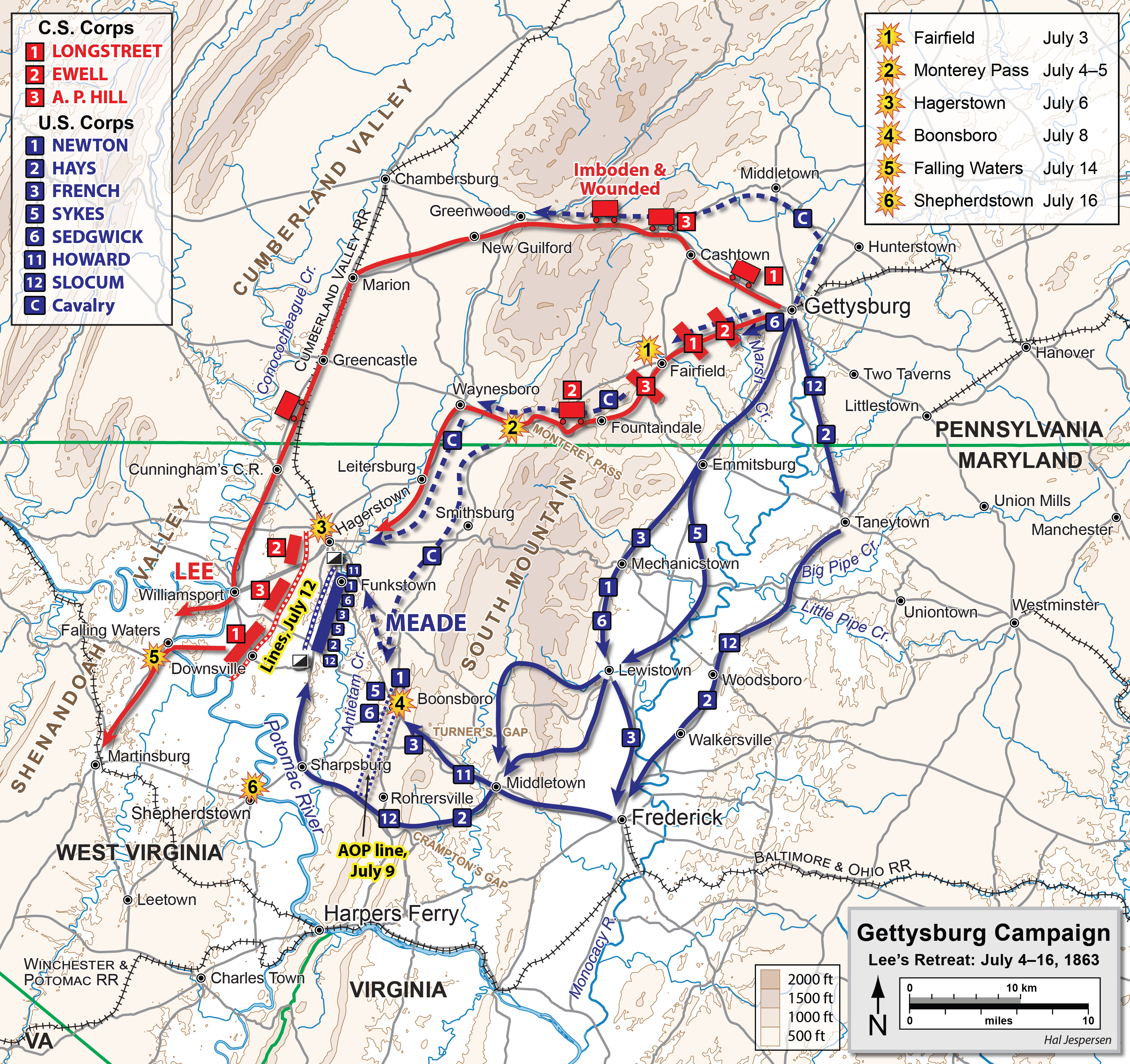
- Retreat from the Battle of Gettysburg
Date	July 4–5, 1863
Location	Monterey Pass, Franklin County, Pennsylvania 39°44′43.7″N 77°27′13.1″W
Result	Union victory

Belligerents
(United States) USA (Union)	(Confederate States of America) CSA (Confederacy)

Commanders and leaders
Judson Kilpatrick	William E. "Grumble" Jones; Beverly H. Robertson

Strength
4,500	Wagon train, cavalry escort

Casualties and losses
43 (5 killed, 10 wounded, 28 missing)	1,300 captured

The Fight at Monterey Pass (or Gap) was an American Civil War military engagement beginning the evening of July 4, 1863, during the Retreat from Gettysburg. A Confederate wagon train of Lt. Gen. Richard S. Ewell's Second Corps, Army of Northern Virginia, withdrew after the Battle of Gettysburg, and Union cavalry under Brig. Gen. H. Judson Kilpatrick attacked the retreating Confederate column. After a lengthy delay in which a small detachment of Maryland cavalrymen delayed Kilpatrick's division, the Union cavalrymen captured numerous Confederate prisoners and destroyed hundreds of wagons.

== Background ==
General Robert E. Lee ordered his Confederate Army of Northern Virginia to begin withdrawing from Gettysburg following his army's defeat on July 3, 1863. When Maj. Gen. George G. Meade's Army of the Potomac did not counterattack by the evening of July 4, Lee realized that he could accomplish nothing more in his Gettysburg campaign and that he had to return his battered army to Virginia. His ability to supply his army by living off the Pennsylvania countryside was now significantly reduced and the Union could easily bring up additional reinforcements as time passed, whereas he could not. Prior to the movement of the infantry and artillery, however, Lee was concerned with removing his long train of wagons, supplies, and wounded men over South Mountain and into the Cumberland Valley. He sent the majority of the wagons and ambulances under the direction of Brig. Gen. John D. Imboden over the Chambersburg Pike, which passed through Cashtown in the direction of Chambersburg and Hagerstown, Maryland.

While Imboden's wagons moved northwest, Lee designated a shorter route for his three corps: southwest through Fairfield and over Monterey Pass to Hagerstown. After dark on July 4, Lt. Gen. A.P. Hill's Third Corps headed out onto the Fairfield Road, followed by Lt. Gen. James Longstreet's First Corps and Lt. Gen. Richard S. Ewell's Second Corps. Lee accompanied Hill at the head of the column. Departing in the dark, Lee had the advantage of getting several hours head start and the route from the west side of the battlefield to Williamsport was about half as long as the ones available to the Army of the Potomac.

However, the first traffic on the Fairfield Road had begun on the evening of July 3, when Ewell, concerned about the logistical challenges of the impending retreat, sent his corps trains and herds of captured cattle ahead of his main body. He divided his wagons into three columns. The first used the Cashtown Gap, the second the Fairfield Gap, and the third the Monterey Pass. The wagons headed for Monterey Pass followed the route of Maj. Gen. George Pickett's division, which was moving to the rear as escorts for the Union prisoners of war from the battle.

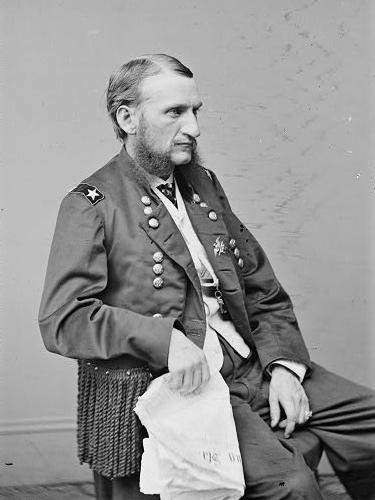
Brig. Gen. Judson Kilpatrick

Early on July 4 Meade sent his cavalry to strike the enemy's rear and lines of communication so as to "harass and annoy him as much as possible in his retreat." Eight cavalry brigades took to the field. Col. J. Irvin Gregg's brigade moved toward Cashtown via Hunterstown and the Mummasburg Road, but all of the others moved south of Gettysburg. Brig. Gen. Judson Kilpatrick's cavalry division joined up with the brigade of Col. Pennock Huey at Emmitsburg, Maryland, and they were ordered to locate and destroy "a heavy train of wagons" that had been spotted by a Union signal station. Assuming that Ewell's corps wagon train was actually the main supply trains for Lee's army, Kilpatrick moved out aggressively at 10 a.m. on July 4, proceeding west on the Waynesboro-Emmitsburg Turnpike toward the village of Fountain Dale (just east of present-day Blue Ridge Summit on Pennsylvania Route 16) and Monterey Pass.

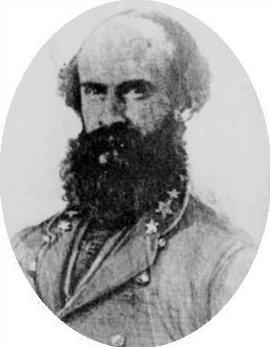
Brig. Gen. William E. "Grumble" Jones

Confederate cavalry commander Maj. Gen. J.E.B. Stuart understood the importance of securing the mountain passes and he assigned the primary responsibility to the cavalry brigades of Brig. Gens. Beverly H. Robertson and William E. "Grumble" Jones. Recognizing the vulnerability of Ewell's immense wagon train in the narrow Monterey Pass, Jones asked permission from Stuart to use his entire brigade to defend it. Stuart allowed the 6th and 7th Virginia Cavalry regiments and a battery of horse artillery under Capt. Roger Preston Chew to be assigned. The 7th Virginia was soon recalled, replaced by the 4th North Carolina Cavalry of Robertson's Brigade.

== Engagement in the Pass ==
Brig. Gen. George A. Custer, a brigade commander under Kilpatrick, received intelligence from a local civilian that the rear of Ewell's wagon train was approaching a large summer resort hotel named Monterey Springs, which sat atop the Pass. Despite being warned of a Confederate artillery placement ahead, Kilpatrick ordered his entire force to advance. A single 12-pounder Napoleon of Courtney's Battery fired a shot at the Union horsemen, but the gunners withdrew before they could be attacked.

The remaining Confederate force on the road up the hill to the Pass consisted of a detachment of 20 dismounted cavalrymen under Capt. George M. Emack from the 1st Maryland Cavalry Battalion , along with a single cannon. As Union troopers from the 5th Michigan Cavalry approached Emack's men, the cannon opened fire and eight of the Marylanders conducted a mounted charge into the head of the Union column. In the dark and the heavy rain, the Union cavalrymen were taken by surprise and many of them retreated in panic. The Confederate cavalrymen dismounted and took up positions on both sides of the road. When the Federals returned, Emack's men waited patiently until they were about 10 yards away and opened fire. The Union cavalrymen were convinced they were opposed by a much larger force. While this standoff continued, Ewell's wagons were moving as swiftly as possible to get out of range of the Union cavalry threat.

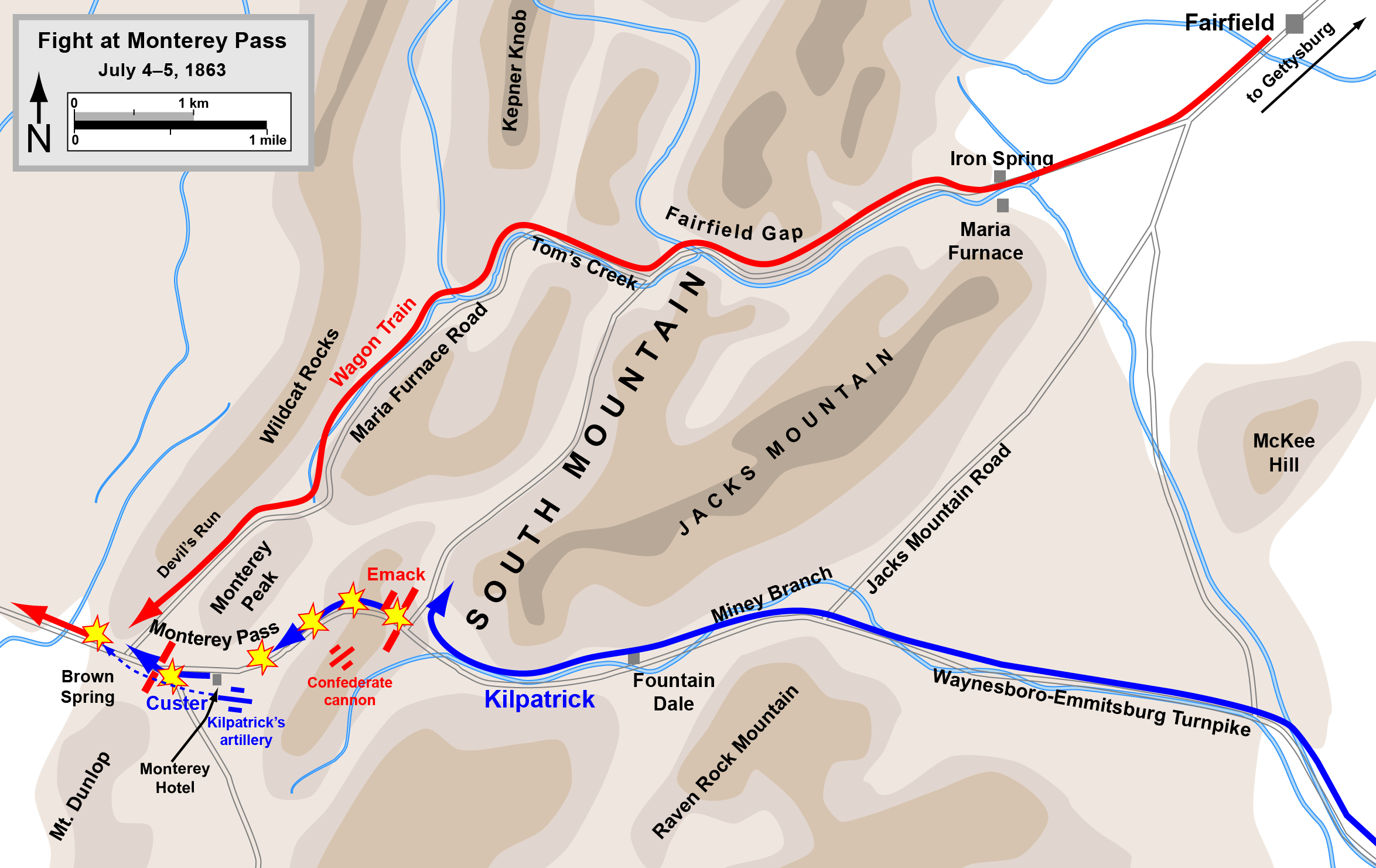
Fight at Monterey Pass

By the time Grumble Jones was able to make his way to the scene through the crowded roads, the small Maryland detachment had been driven back several hundred yards, almost to the road junction being used by the wagon train. By this time less than one half of the train had made it safely through the Pass. Jones promised reinforcements from the 6th Virginia Cavalry and Emack ordered his men to hold their ground and conserve their ammunition. Meanwhile, elements of Jones's cavalry attacked Huey's brigade in the rear of Kilpatrick's column.

Kilpatrick brought forward two guns of horse artillery from Lt. Alexander C. M. Pennington's Battery M, 2nd U.S. Artillery, supported by men of the 1st Ohio Cavalry. South of the hotel, a bridge on the road had not been destroyed by the Confederates and Col. Russell A. Alger of the 5th Michigan Cavalry requested reinforcements to make a mounted charge across the bridge. Kilpatrick ordered Custer to make the attack with his full Michigan Brigade. The advance of the 5th and 6th Michigan Cavalry regiments was slowed by the darkness, difficult terrain, and dense undergrowth. The tiny group of Marylanders, supported by a few cavalrymen from the 4th North Carolina of Robertson's Brigade, had delayed the Union advance for nearly five hours.

At about 3 a.m. on July 5, as the Michigan Brigade continued to move slowly forward, Kilpatrick sent in the 1st West Virginia Cavalry under Major Charles E. Capehart. Capehart's 640 officers and men charged what they imagined to be "five times" their numbers. In hand-to-hand fighting with sabers and revolvers, they seized the Confederate cannon and Capehart was later awarded the Medal of Honor for his gallant service. The road was open to attack the wagon train.

== Attacking the wagon train ==
The Union cavalrymen crashed into the column of now lightly protected wagons. Custer, in his enthusiasm for the charge, was thrown from his horse and nearly captured. Grumble Jones also narrowly avoided capture. Pennington's artillery began shelling the wagons toward the rear of the column, splintering carriages and blocking any opportunity for retreat. The Union and Confederate cavalrymen became thoroughly mixed up among the wagons and the enemies were unable to differentiate themselves in the darkness. Several friendly fire incidents occurred as Union troopers accidentally fired on their own lines.

Union troopers rode all the way through the wagon train until they reached Ewell's infantry and captured large numbers of prisoners before returning to repeat the effort. They erected hasty barricades in front of the wagon train to protect what they had captured. More than 1,300 Confederates—primarily wounded men in ambulances, but also slaves, free blacks, and some cavalrymen—were captured and most of the wagons were destroyed. Many of the mules survived and were turned over to the Cavalry Corps quartermaster. Kilpatrick later reported that he had destroyed Ewell's entire wagon train, although he had in fact encountered only a fraction of the full, 40-mile long train. The Confederates lost about 250 wagons and ambulances with casualties from Iverson's and Daniel's Brigades and of three artillery battalions, as well as 37 wagons from Maj. Gen. Robert E. Rodes's division quartermaster trains.

== Aftermath ==
Following the fight at Monterey Pass, Kilpatrick’s division reached Smithsburg around 2 p.m. on July 5. Stuart arrived from over South Mountain with the brigades of Chambliss and Ferguson. A horse artillery duel ensued, causing some damage to the small town. Kilpatrick withdrew at dark "to save my prisoners, animals, and wagons" and arrived at Boonsboro (spelled Boonsborough at that time) before midnight.

Lee's retreat continued to the Potomac, as minor combat operations—primarily cavalry actions—occurred at Hagerstown (July 6 and 12), Boonsboro (July 8), Funkstown (July 7 and 10), and around Williamsport and Falling Waters (July 6–14). At the Potomac, the Confederates found that rising waters and destroyed pontoon bridges prevented their immediate crossing. Erecting substantial defensive works, they awaited the arrival of the Union army, which had been pursuing over longer roads more to the south of Lee's route. Before Meade could perform adequate reconnaissance and attack the Confederate fortifications, Lee's army escaped across fords and a hastily rebuilt bridge.

== Legacy ==
The history of the Monterey Pass battle is commemorated by the Monterey Pass Battlefield Park and Museum, which opened in 2015. Multiple historical markers are present near the site, including a Pennsylvania marker installed in 1940, and a Michigan historical marker dedicated at the museum's opening. The Michigan historical marker is one of eight located outside the state of Michigan.

A 40-minute documentary on the battle entitled Ten Days and Still They Come — The Battle at Monterey Pass was released in 2011.

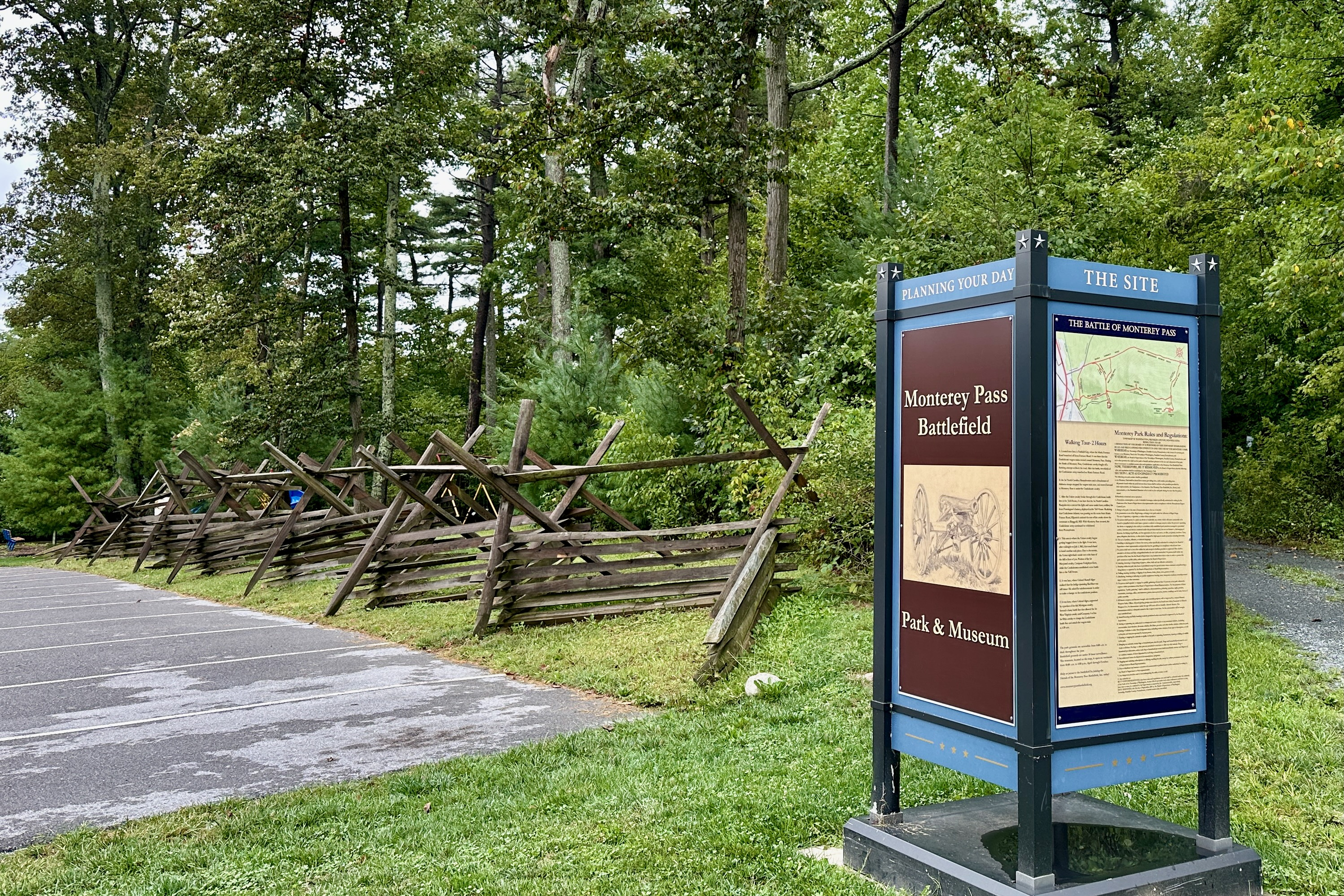
Monterey Pass Battlefield Park

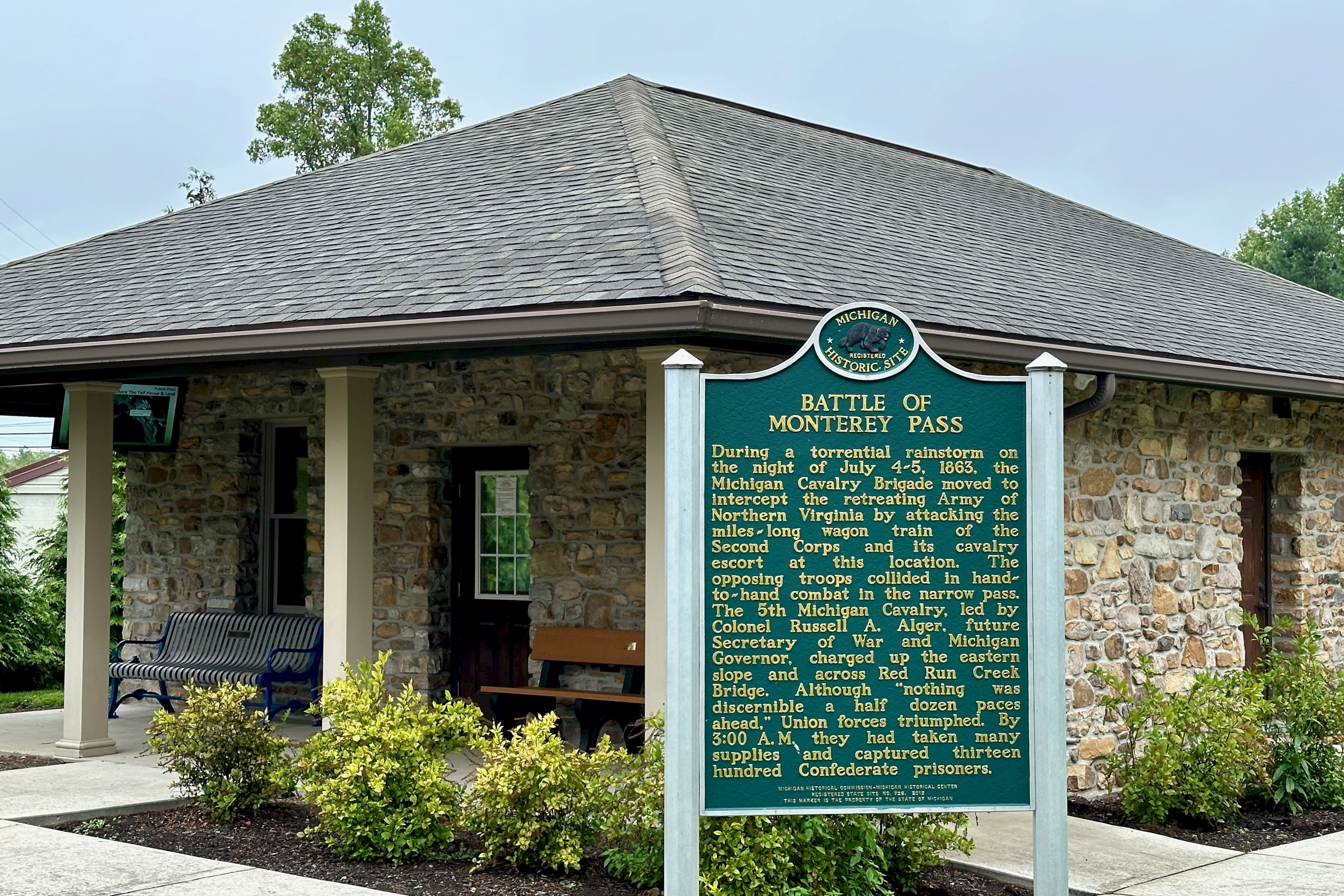
Monterey Pass Battlefield Museum and Michigan Historical Marker
