= Retreat from Gettysburg =

Part of the American Civil War in 1863

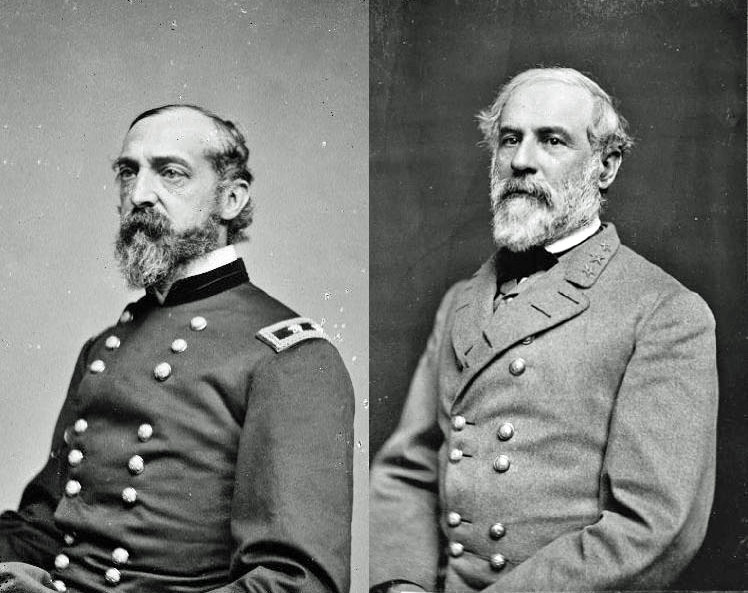
Commanding generals George G. Meade and Robert E. Lee

The Confederate Army of Northern Virginia began its Retreat from Gettysburg on July 4, 1863. Following General Robert E. Lee's failure to defeat the Union Army at the Battle of Gettysburg (July 1–3, 1863), he ordered a retreat through Maryland and over the Potomac River to relative safety in Virginia.

The Union Army of the Potomac, commanded by Maj. Gen. George G. Meade, was unable to maneuver quickly enough to launch a significant attack on the Confederates, who crossed the river on the night of July 13 into South Mountain through Cashtown in a wagon train that extended for 15–20 miles, enduring harsh weather, treacherous roads, and enemy cavalry raids. The bulk of Lee's infantry departed through Fairfield in Pennsylvania and through the Monterey Pass toward Hagerstown, Maryland. Reaching the Potomac River, they found that rising waters and destroyed pontoon bridges prevented their immediate crossing. Erecting substantial defensive works, they awaited the arrival of the Union army, which had been pursuing over longer roads more to the south of Lee's route. Before Meade could perform adequate reconnaissance and attack the Confederate fortifications, Lee's army escaped across fords and a hastily rebuilt bridge.

Combat operations, primarily cavalry battles, raids, and skirmishes, occurred during the retreat at Fairfield (July 3), Monterey Pass (July 4–5), Smithsburg (July 5), Hagerstown (July 6 and 12), Boonsboro (July 8), Funkstown (July 7 and 10), and around Williamsport and Falling Waters (July 6–14). Additional clashes after the armies crossed the Potomac occurred at Shepherdstown (July 16) and Manassas Gap (July 23) in Virginia, ending the Gettysburg campaign of June and July 1863.

== Background ==
=== Military situation ===
The culmination of the three-day Battle of Gettysburg was the massive infantry assault known as Pickett's Charge, in which the Confederate attack against the center of the Union line on Cemetery Ridge was repulsed with significant losses. The Confederates returned to their positions on Seminary Ridge and prepared to receive a counterattack. When the Union attack had not occurred by the evening of July 4, Lee realized that he could accomplish nothing more in his Gettysburg campaign and that he had to return his battered army to Virginia. His ability to supply his army by living off the Pennsylvania countryside was now significantly reduced and the Union could easily bring up additional reinforcements as time passed, whereas he could not. Brig. Gen. William N. Pendleton, Lee's artillery chief, reported to him that all of his long-range artillery ammunition had been expended and there were no early prospects for resupply. However, despite casualties of over 20,000 officers and men, including a number of senior officers, the morale of Lee's army remained high and their respect for the commanding general was not diminished by their reverses.

Lee began his preparations for retreat on the night of July 3, following a council of war with some of his subordinate commanders. He consolidated his lines by pulling Lt. Gen. Richard S. Ewell's Second Corps from the Culp's Hill area back through the town of Gettysburg and onto Oak Ridge and Seminary Ridge. His men constructed breastworks and rifle pits that extended 2.5 miles from the Mummasburg Road to the Emmitsburg Road. He decided to send his long train of wagons carrying equipment and supplies, which had been captured in great quantities throughout the campaign, to the rear as quickly as possible, in advance of the infantry. The wagon train included ambulances with his 8,000 wounded men who were fit to travel, as well as some of the key general officers who were severely wounded, but too important to be abandoned. The great bulk of the Confederate wounded—over 6,800 men—remained behind to be treated in Union field hospitals and by a few of Lee's surgeons selected to stay with them.

There were two routes the army could take over South Mountain to the Cumberland Valley (the name given to the Shenandoah Valley in Maryland and Pennsylvania), from where it would march south to cross the Potomac at Williamsport, Maryland: the Chambersburg Pike, which passed through Cashtown in the direction of Chambersburg, and; the shorter route through Fairfield and over Monterey Pass to Hagerstown. Fortunately for the Confederate army, it now had its full complement of cavalry available for reconnaissance and screening activities, a capability it lacked earlier in the campaign while its commander, Maj. Gen. J.E.B. Stuart, was separated from the army with his three best cavalry brigades on "Stuart's ride".

Unfortunately for the Confederate Army, however, once they reached the Potomac they would find it difficult to cross. Torrential rains that started on July 4 flooded the river at Williamsport, making fording impossible. Four miles downstream at Falling Waters, Union cavalry dispatched from Harpers Ferry by Maj. Gen. William H. French destroyed Lee's lightly guarded pontoon bridge on July 4. The only way to cross the river was a small ferry at Williamsport. The Confederates could potentially be trapped, forced to defend themselves against Meade with their backs to the river.

== Opposing forces ==
The Union Army of the Potomac and the Confederate Army of Northern Virginia retained their general organizations with which they fought at the Battle of Gettysburg. By July 10, some of the Union battle losses had been replaced and Meade's army stood at about 80,000 men. The Confederates received no reinforcements during the campaign and had only about 50,000 men available.

=== Union ===
The Army of the Potomac had significant changes in general officer assignments because of its battle losses. Meade's chief of staff, Maj. Gen. Daniel Butterfield, was wounded on July 3 and was replaced on July 8 by Maj. Gen. Andrew A. Humphreys; Brig. Gen. Henry Price replaced Humphreys in command of his old division of the III Corps. Maj. Gen. John F. Reynolds, killed on July 1, was replaced by Maj. Gen. John Newton of the VI Corps. Maj. Gen. Winfield Scott Hancock of the II Corps, wounded on July 3, was replaced by Brig. Gen. William Hays. Maj. Gen. William H. French, who had temporarily commanded the garrison at Harpers Ferry for most of the campaign, replaced the wounded Daniel Sickles in command of the III Corps on July 7. In addition to the battle losses, Meade's army was plagued by a condition that persisted during the war, the departure of men and regiments whose enlistments had expired, which took effect even in the midst of an active campaign. To make matters worse, thousands of Union soldiers who had not eaten since the battle began would have to be fed while boots, forage and shoes for the Army's horses and mules needed to be replenished to pursue Lee's army. On the plus side, however, Meade had available temporary, although inexperienced, reinforcements of about 10,000 men who had been with General French at Maryland Heights, which were incorporated into the I Corps and III Corps. The net effect of expiring enlistments and reinforcements added about 6,000 men to the Army of the Potomac. Including the forces around Harpers Ferry, Maryland Heights, and the South Mountain passes, by July 14 between 11,000 and 12,000 men had been added the army, although Meade had extreme doubts about the combat effectiveness of these troops.

In addition to the Army of the Potomac, Maj. Gen. Darius N. Couch of the Department of the Susquehanna had 7,600 men at Waynesboro, 11,000 at Chambersburg, and 6,700 at Mercersburg. These were emergency troops that were hastily raised during Lee's march into Pennsylvania and were subject to Meade's orders. In addition, a force of about 6,000 from the newly created Department of West Virginia under Brig. Gen. Benjamin Franklin Kelley sat astride the Baltimore and Ohio Railroad at Grafton, and New Creek in West Virginia, to prevent Confederate forces from retreating west, and later assisting in the pursuit of Lee toward Virginia.

=== Confederate ===
Lee's Army of Northern Virginia retained its corps organization and commanders, although a number of key subordinate generals were killed or mortally wounded (Lewis Armistead, Richard B. Garnett, Isaac E. Avery, and William Barksdale), captured (James L. Kemper and James J. Archer), or severely wounded (John Bell Hood, Wade Hampton, George T. Anderson, Dorsey Pender, and Alfred M. Scales).

== Imboden's wagon train ==
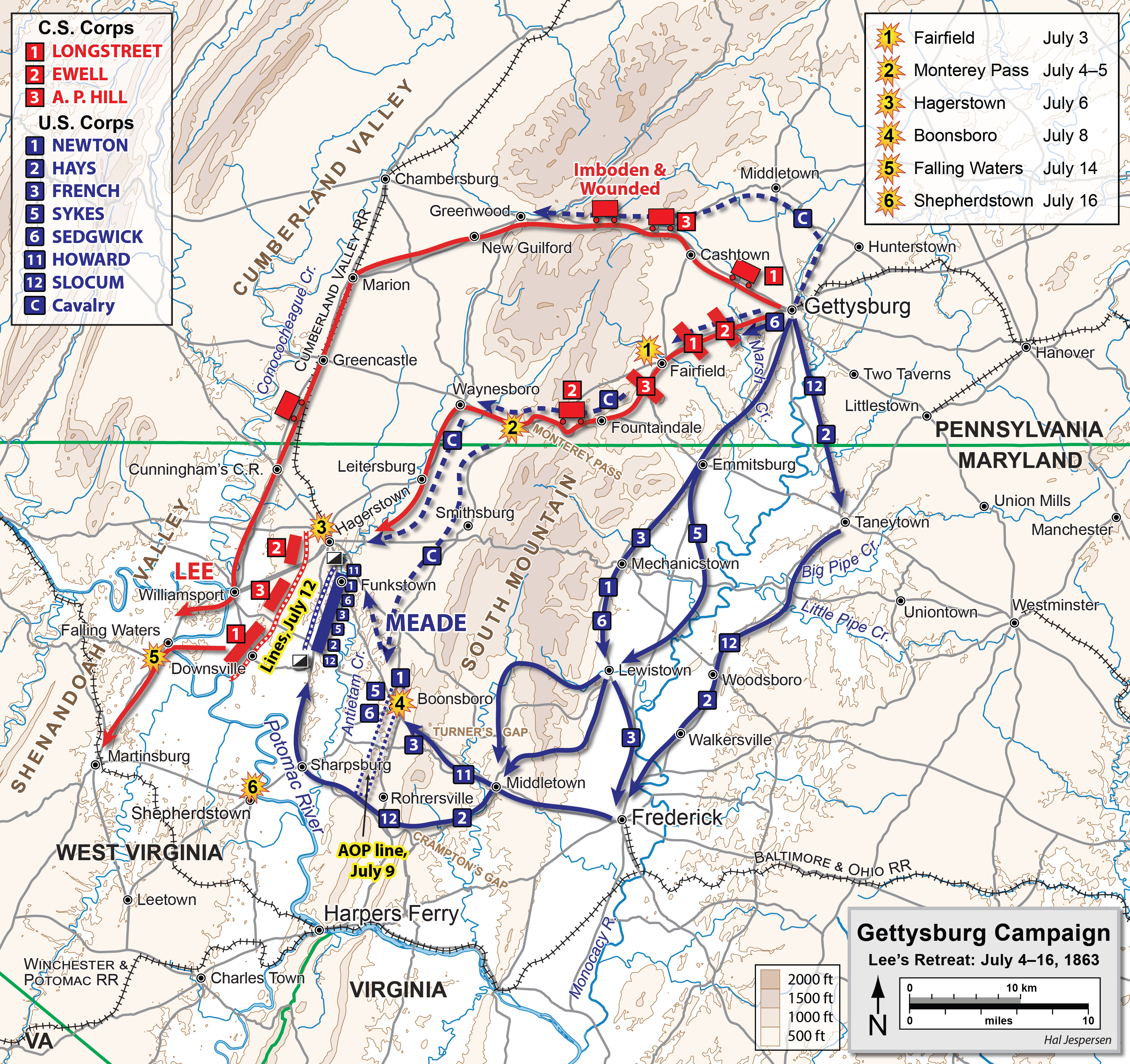
The Gettysburg campaign (July 5–14) Confederate Union

At 1 a.m. on July 4, Lee summoned to his headquarters Brig. Gen. John D. Imboden, one of Stuart's cavalry brigade commanders, to manage the passage of the majority of the trains to the rear. Imboden's command of 2,100 cavalrymen had not played much of a role in the campaign up until this time, and had not been selected by Stuart for his ride around the Union Army. Lee and Stuart had a poor opinion of Imboden's brigade, considering it "indifferently disciplined and inefficiently directed," but it was effective for assignments such as guard duty or fighting militia. Lee reinforced Imboden's single artillery battery with five additional batteries borrowed from his infantry corps and directed Stuart to assign the brigades of Brig. Gen. Fitzhugh Lee and Wade Hampton (now commanded by Col. Laurence S. Baker) to protect the flanks and rear of Imboden's column. Imboden's orders were to depart Cashtown on the evening of July 4, turn south at Greenwood, avoiding Chambersburg, take the direct road to Williamsport to ford across the Potomac, and escort the train as far as Martinsburg. Then, Imboden's command would return to Hagerstown to guard the retreat route for the remainder of the army.

Imboden's train consisted of hundreds of wagons, which extended 15–20 miles along the narrow roads. Assembling these wagons into a marching column, arranging their escorts, loading supplies, and accounting for the wounded took until late afternoon on July 5. Imboden himself left Cashtown around 8 p.m. to join the head of his column. The journey was one of extreme misery, conducted during the torrential rains that began on July 4, in which the wounded men were forced to endure the weather and the rough roads in wagons without suspensions. Imboden's orders required that he not stop until he reached his destination, which meant that wagons breaking down were left behind. Some critically wounded men were left behind on the roadsides as well, hoping that local civilians would find and take care of them. The train was harassed throughout its march. At dawn on July 5, civilians in Greencastle ambushed the train with axes, attacking the wheels of the wagons, until they were driven off. That afternoon at Cunningham's Cross Roads (current day Cearfoss, Maryland), Capt. Abram Jones led 200 troopers of the 1st New York Cavalry and 12th Pennsylvania Cavalry in attacking the column, capturing 134 wagons, 600 horses and mules, and 645 prisoners, about half of whom were wounded. These losses so angered Stuart that he demanded a court of inquiry to investigate.

== Fairfield and Monterey Pass ==
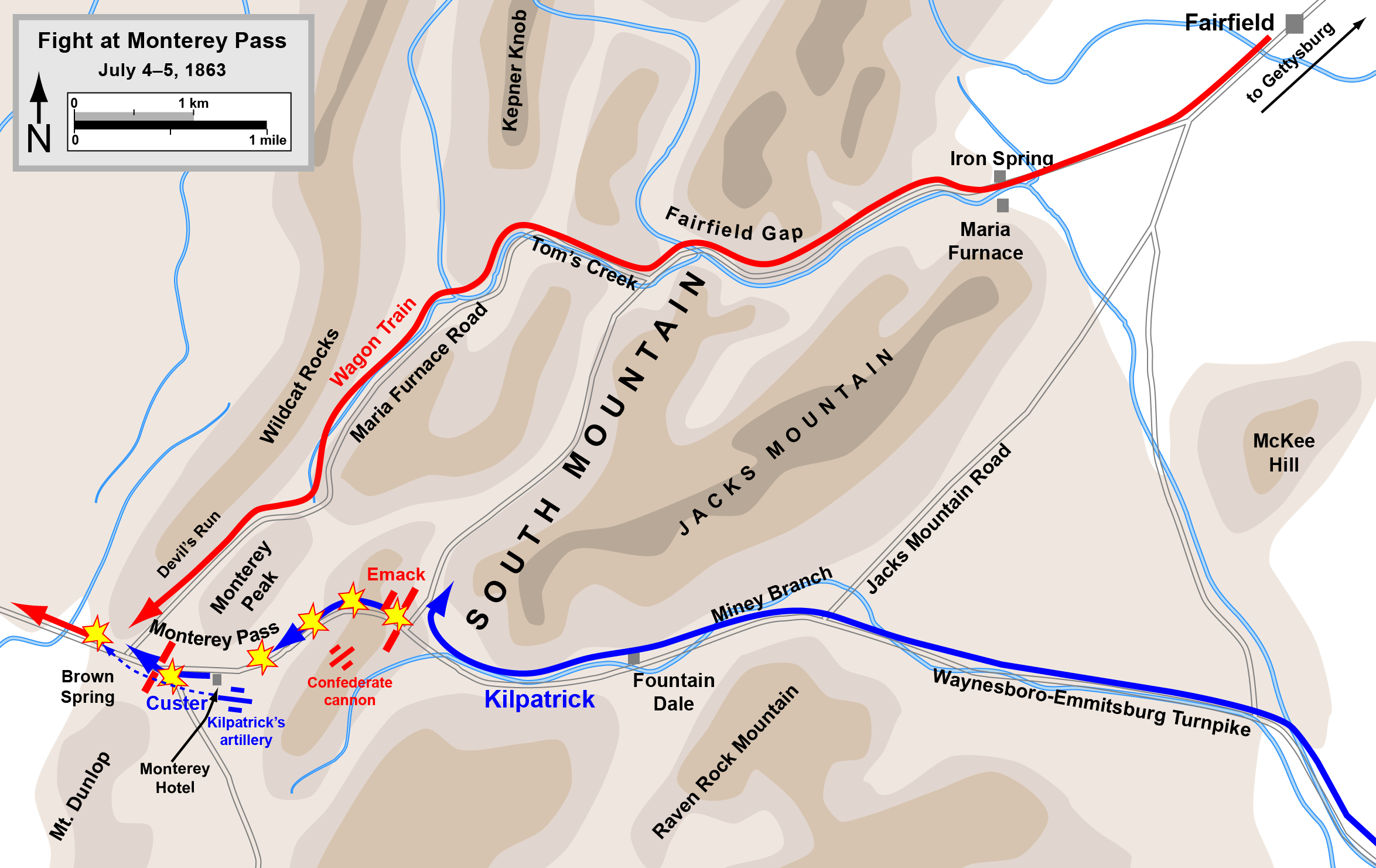
Fight at Monterey Pass

After dark on July 4, Hill's Third Corps headed out onto the Fairfield Road, followed by Lt. Gen. James Longstreet's First Corps and Richard S. Ewell's Second Corps. Lee accompanied Hill at the head of the column. He ordered Stuart to post Col. John R. Chambliss's and Brig. Gen. Albert G. Jenkins's brigades (the latter commanded by Col. Milton Ferguson) to cover his left rear from Emmitsburg. Departing in the dark, Lee had the advantage of getting several hours head start and the route from the west side of the battlefield to Williamsport was about half as long as the ones available to the Army of the Potomac.

Meade was reluctant to begin an immediate pursuit because he was unsure whether Lee intended to attack again and his orders continued that he was required to protect the cities of Baltimore and Washington, D.C. Since Meade believed that the Confederates had well fortified the South Mountain passes, he decided he would pursue Lee on the east side of the mountains, conduct forced marches to quickly seize the passes west of Frederick, Maryland, and threaten Lee's left flank as he retreated up the Cumberland Valley. However, Meade's assumption was wrong—Fairfield was lightly held by only two small cavalry brigades and the passes over South Mountain were not fortified. If Meade had secured Fairfield, Lee's army would have been forced to either fight its way through Fairfield while its rear was exposed to the Army of the Potomac at Gettysburg or to take his entire army through the Cashtown Pass, a much more difficult route to Hagerstown.

On July 3, while Pickett's Charge was underway, the Union cavalry had had a unique opportunity to impede Lee's eventual retreat. Brig. Gen. Wesley Merritt's brigade departed from Emmitsburg with orders from cavalry commander Maj. Gen. Alfred Pleasonton to strike the Confederate right and rear along Seminary Ridge. Reacting to a report from a local civilian that there was a Confederate forage train near Fairfield, Merritt dispatched about 400 men in four squadrons from the 6th U.S. Cavalry under Major Samuel H. Starr to seize the wagons. Before they were able to reach the wagons, the 7th Virginia Cavalry, leading a column under Confederate Brig. Gen. William E. "Grumble" Jones, intercepted the regulars, starting the minor Battle of Fairfield. Taking cover behind a post-and rail fence, the U.S. cavalrymen opened fire and caused the Virginians to retreat. Jones sent in the 6th Virginia Cavalry, which successfully charged and swarmed over the Union troopers, wounding and capturing Starr. There were 242 Union casualties, primarily prisoners, and 44 casualties among the Confederates. Despite the relatively small scale of this action, its result was that the strategically important Fairfield Road to the South Mountain passes remained open.

Early on July 4 Meade sent his cavalry to strike the enemy's rear and lines of communication so as to "harass and annoy him as much as possible in his retreat." Eight of nine cavalry brigades (except Col. John B. McIntosh's of Brig. Gen. David McM. Gregg's division) took to the field. Col. J. Irvin Gregg's brigade (of his cousin David Gregg's division) moved toward Cashtown via Hunterstown and the Mummasburg Road, but all of the others moved south of Gettysburg. Brig. Gen. John Buford's division went directly from Westminster to Frederick, where they were joined by Merritt's division on the night of July 5.

Late on July 4, Meade held a council of war in which his corps commanders agreed that the army should remain at Gettysburg until Lee acted, and that the cavalry should pursue Lee in any retreat. Meade decided to have Brig. Gen. Gouverneur K. Warren take a division from Maj. Gen. John Sedgwick's VI Corps—the most lightly engaged of all the Union corps at Gettysburg—to probe the Confederate line and determine Lee's intentions. Meade ordered Butterfield to prepare for a general movement of the army, which he organized into three wings, commanded by Sedgwick (I, III, and VI Corps), Maj. Gen. Henry W. Slocum (II and XII), and Maj. Gen. Oliver O. Howard (V and XI). By the morning of July 5, Meade learned of Lee's departure, but he hesitated to order a general pursuit until he had received the results of Warren's reconnaissance.

The Battle of Monterey Pass began as Brig. Gen. Judson Kilpatrick's cavalry division arrived near Fairfield on July 4 just before dark. They easily brushed aside Brig. Gen. Beverly Robertson's pickets and encountered a detachment of 20 men from the Confederate 1st Maryland Cavalry Battalion, under Capt. G. M. Emack, that was guarding the road to Monterey Pass. Aided by a detachment of the 4th North Carolina Cavalry and a single cannon, the Marylanders delayed the advance of 4,500 Union cavalrymen until well after midnight. Kilpatrick was not able to see anything in the dark and considered his command to be in "a perilous situation." He ordered Brig. Gen. George A. Custer to charge the Confederates with the 6th Michigan Cavalry, which broke the deadlock and allowed Kilpatrick's men to reach and attack the wagon train. They captured or destroyed numerous wagons and captured 1,360 prisoners—primarily wounded men in ambulances—and a large number of horses and mules.

Following the fight at Monterey, Kilpatrick's division reached Smithsburg around 2 p.m. on July 5. Stuart arrived from over South Mountain with the brigades of Chambliss and Ferguson. A horse artillery duel ensued, causing some damage to the small town. Kilpatrick withdrew at dark "to save my prisoners, animals, and wagons" and arrived at Boonsboro (spelled Boonsborough at that time) before midnight.

== Sedgwick's reconnaissance ==
The reconnaissance from Sedgwick's corps began before dawn on the morning of July 5, but instead of a division they took the entire corps. It struck the rear guard of Ewell's corps late in the afternoon at Granite Hill near Fairfield, but the result was little more than a skirmish, and the Confederates camped a mile and a half west of Fairfield, holding their position with only their picket line. Warren informed Meade that he and Sedgwick believed Lee was concentrating the main body of his army around Fairfield and preparing for battle. Meade immediately halted his army and early on the morning of July 6, he ordered Sedgwick to resume his reconnaissance to determine Lee's intentions and the status of the mountain passes. Sedgwick argued with him about the risky nature of sending his entire corps into the rugged country and dense fog ahead of him and by noon Meade abandoned his plan, resuming his original intention of advancing east of the mountains to Middletown, Maryland. The delays leaving Gettysburg and the conflicting orders to Sedgwick about whether to conduct merely a reconnaissance or a vigorous advance to engage Lee's army in combat would later cause Meade political difficulties as his opponents charged him with indecision and timidity.

In view of Sedgwick's lack of aggressiveness in the advance to Fairfield his remark after the campaign that Meade in his pursuit "might have pushed Lee harder" seems singularly inappropriate.

— Edwin B. Coddington, The Gettysburg Campaign

Given the conflicting signals from Meade, Sedgwick and Warren followed the more conservative course. They waited to start until Ewell's Corps had cleared out of Fairfield and remained at a safe distance behind it as it moved west. Lee assumed that Sedgwick would attack his rear and was ready for it. He told Ewell, "If these people keep coming on, turn back and thresh them." Ewell replied, "By the blessing of Providence I will do it" and ordered Maj. Gen. Robert E. Rodes's division to form a battle line. The VI Corps followed Lee only to the top of Monterey Pass, however, and did not pursue down the other side.

== Pursuit to Williamsport ==
Other than Gettysburg, the Battle of Hagerstown was one of the bloodiest actions in the campaign. Each side reported losing more than 250 men. Most of these were rebel and Yankee horsemen, giving the lie to the infantrymen's derisive taunt, "Who ever heard of a dead cavalryman?"

— Ted Alexander, Washington Times

Before Meade's infantry began to march in earnest in pursuit of Lee, Buford's cavalry division departed from Frederick to destroy Imboden's train before it could cross the Potomac. Hagerstown was a key point on the Confederate retreat route, and seizing it might block or delay their access to the fords across the river. On July 6, Kilpatrick's division, after its success raiding at Monterey Pass, moved toward Hagerstown and pushed out the two small brigades of Chambliss and Robertson. However, infantry commanded by Brig. Gen. Alfred Iverson drove Kilpatrick's men back through the streets of town. Stuart's remaining brigades came up and were reinforced by two brigades of Hood's Division and Hagerstown was recaptured by the Confederates.

Buford heard Kilpatrick's artillery in the vicinity and requested support on his right. Kilpatrick chose to respond to Buford's request for assistance and join the attack on Imboden at Williamsport. Stuart's men pressured Kilpatrick's rear and right flank from their position at Hagerstown and Kilpatrick's men gave way and exposed Buford's rear to the attack. Buford gave up his effort when darkness fell. At 5 p.m. on July 7 Buford's men reached within a half-mile of the parked trains, but Imboden's command repulsed their advance.

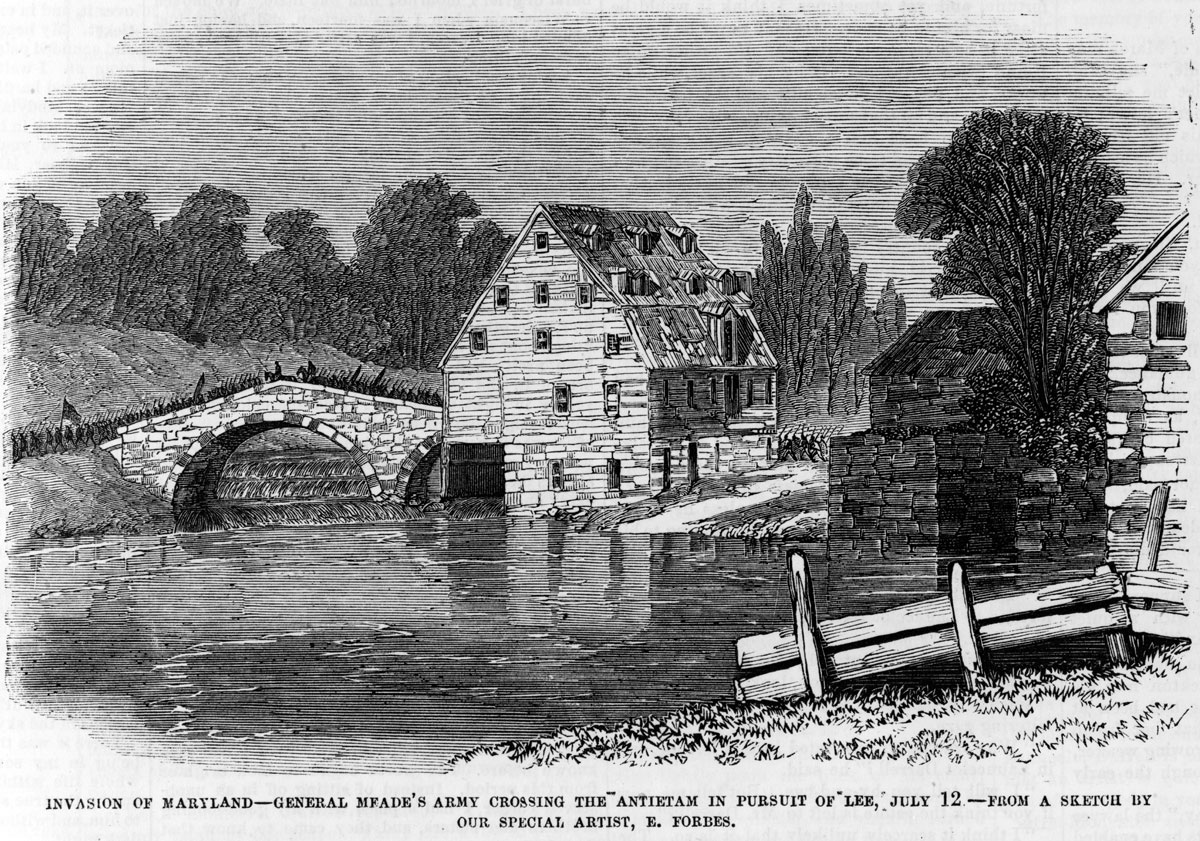
Invasion of Maryland - General Meade's army crossing the Antietam in pursuit of Lee, July 12, engraving for Frank Leslie's illustrated newspaper by Edwin Forbes

The Battle of Boonsboro occurred along the National Road on July 8. Stuart advanced from the direction of Funkstown and Williamsport with five brigades. He first encountered Union resistance at Beaver Creek Bridge, 4.5 miles north of Boonsboro. By 11 a.m., the Confederate cavalry had pushed forward to several mud-soaked fields, where fighting on horseback was nearly impossible, forcing Stuart's troopers and Kilpatrick's and Buford's divisions to fight dismounted. By mid-afternoon, the Union left under Kilpatrick crumbled as the Federals ran low on ammunition under increasing Confederate pressure. Stuart's advance ended about 7 p.m., however, when Union infantry arrived, and Stuart withdrew north to Funkstown.

Stuart's strong presence at Funkstown threatened any Union advance toward Williamsport, posing a serious risk to the Federal right and rear if the Union army moved west from Boonsboro. As Buford's division cautiously approached Funkstown via the National Road on July 10, it encountered Stuart's crescent-shaped, three-mile-long battle line, initiating the [Second] Battle of Funkstown (the first being a minor skirmish on July 7 between Buford's 6th U.S. Cavalry and the 7th Virginia Cavalry of Grumble Jones's brigade). Col. Thomas C. Devin's dismounted Union cavalry brigade attacked about 8 a.m. By mid-afternoon, with Buford's cavalrymen running low on ammunition and gaining little ground, Col. Lewis A. Grant's First Vermont Brigade of infantry arrived and clashed with Brig. Gen. George T. Anderson's Confederate brigade (commanded after Anderson's wounding at Gettysburg by Col. William W. White), the first time opposing infantry had fought since the Battle of Gettysburg. By early evening, Buford's command began withdrawing south towards Beaver Creek, where the Union I, VI, and XI Corps had concentrated.

Buford and Kilpatrick continued to hold their advance position around Boonsboro, awaiting the arrival of the Army of the Potomac. French's command sent troops to destroy the railroad bridge at Harpers Ferry and a brigade to occupied Maryland Heights, which prevented the Confederates from outflanking the lower end of South Mountain and threatening Frederick from the southwest.

== Face-off at the Potomac ==
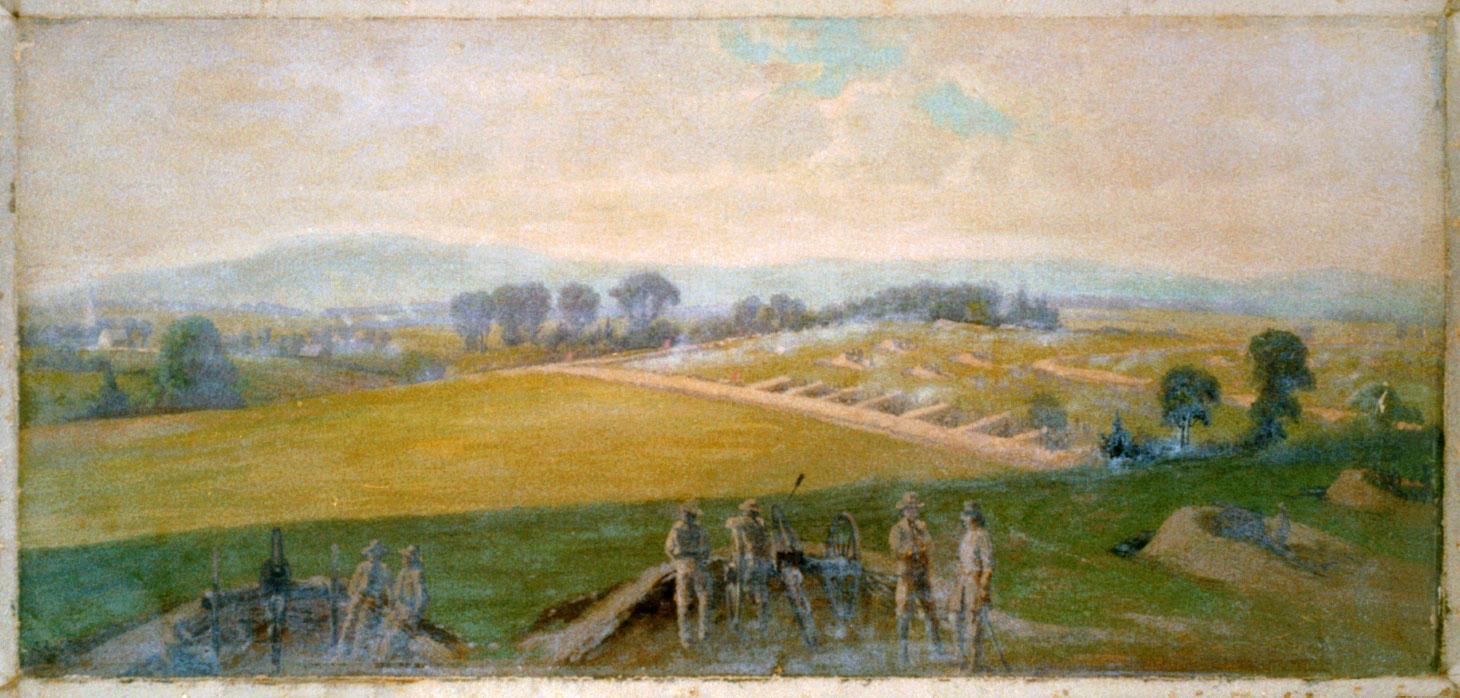
Earthworks in Lee's Potomac line (Last stand of the Army of Virginia, commanded by General Lee), painting by Edwin Forbes

Meade's infantry had been marching hard since the morning of July 7. Slocum's wing marched 29 miles on the first day from Littlestown, Pennsylvania, to Walkersville, Maryland. Parts of the XI Corps covered distances estimated between 30 and 34 miles from Emmitsburg to Middletown. By July 9 most of the Army of the Potomac was concentrated in a 5-mile line from Rohrersville to Boonsboro. Other Union forces were in position to protect the outer flanks at Maryland Heights and at Waynesboro. Reaching these positions was difficult because of the torrential rains on July 7 that turned the roads to quagmires of mud. Long detours were required for the III and V Corps, although the disadvantage of the additional distance was offset by the roads' proximity to Frederick, which was connected by the Baltimore and Ohio Railroad to Union supply centers, and by the superior condition of those roads, including the macadamized National Road.

The spirit of the army is such that they will do most desperate fighting. ... The men know now that Lee's Army is not invincible and that the Army of the Potomac can win a victory if it is allowed to. Our Army ... ought to drive the Rebels into the Potomac.

— Augustus Van Dyke, 14th Indiana, letter to his father

The Confederate Army's rear guard arrived in Hagerstown on the morning of July 7, screened skillfully by their cavalry, and began to establish defensive positions. By July 11 they occupied a 6-mile line on high ground with their right resting on the Potomac River near Downsville and the left about 1.5 miles southwest of Hagerstown, covering the only road from there to Williamsport. The Conococheague Creek protected the position from any attack that might be launched from the west. They erected impressive earthworks with a 6-foot-wide (1.8 m) parapet on top and frequent gun emplacements, creating comprehensive crossfire zones. Longstreet's Corps occupied the right end of the line, Hill's the center, and Ewell's the left. These works were completed on the morning of July 12, just as the Union army arrived to confront them.

Meade telegraphed to general-in-chief Henry W. Halleck on July 12 that he intended to attack the next day, "unless something intervenes to prevent it." He once again called a council of war with his subordinates on the night of July 12. Of the seven senior officers, only Brig. Gen. James S. Wadsworth and Maj. Gen. Oliver O. Howard were in favor of attacking the Confederate fortifications. Objections centered on the lack of reconnaissance that had been performed. On July 13, Meade and Humphreys scouted the positions personally and issued orders to the corps commanders for a reconnaissance in force on the morning of July 14. This one-day postponement was another instance of delay for which Meade's political enemies castigated him after the campaign. Halleck told Meade that it was "proverbial that councils of war never fight."

== Across the Potomac ==
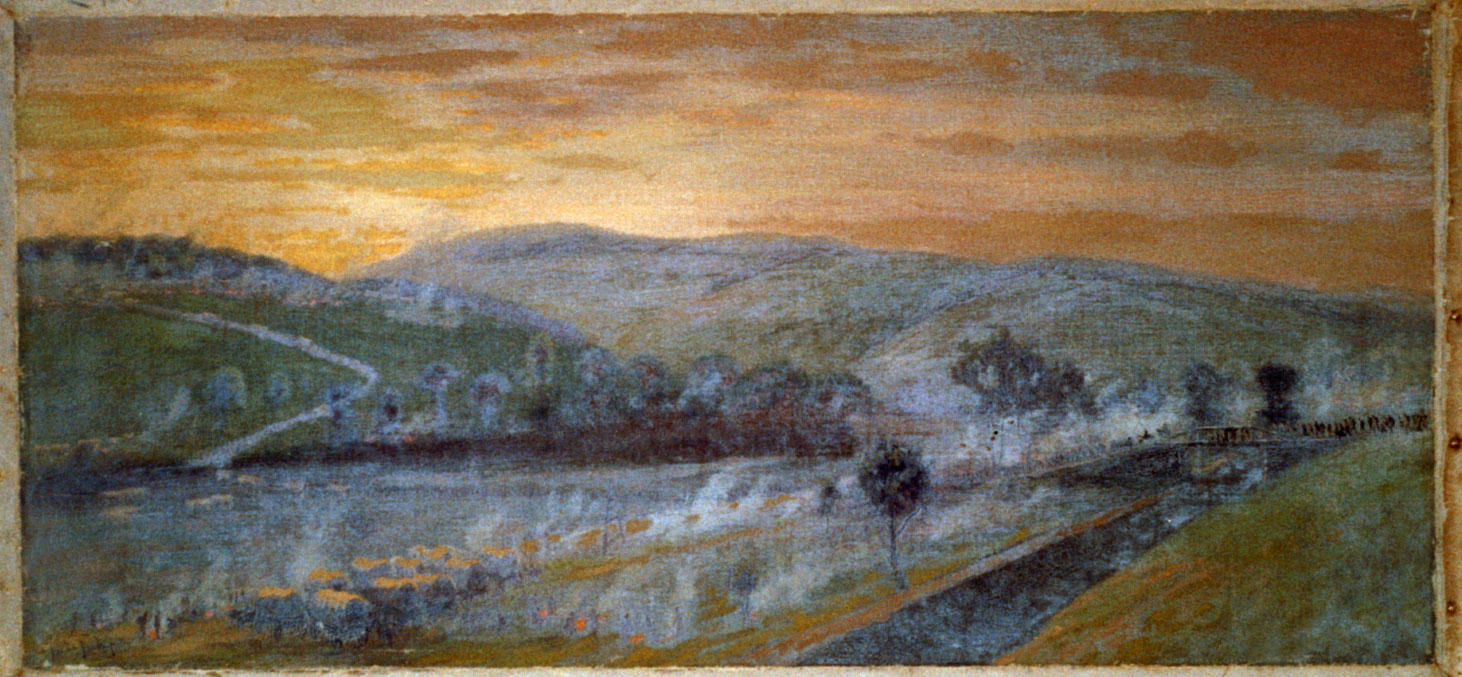
Escape of the Army of Virginia, commanded by General Lee, over the Potomac River near Williamsport, painting by Edwin Forbes

On the morning of July 13, Lee became frustrated waiting for Meade to attack him and was dismayed to see that the Federal troops were digging entrenchments of their own in front of his works. He said impatiently, "That is too long for me; I can not wait for that. ... They have but little courage!" By this time Confederate engineers had completed a new pontoon bridge over the Potomac, which had also subsided enough to be forded. Lee ordered a retreat to start after dark, with Longstreet's and Hill's corps and the artillery to use the pontoon bridge at Falling Waters and Ewell's corps to ford the river at Williamsport.

Meade's orders had stated that the reconnaissance in force by four of his corps would be started by 7 a.m. on July 14, but by this time signs were clear that the enemy had withdrawn. Advancing skirmishers found that the entrenchments were empty. Meade ordered a general pursuit of the Confederates at 8:30 a.m., but very little contact could be made at this late hour. Cavalry under Buford and Kilpatrick attacked the rearguard of Lee's army, Maj. Gen. Henry Heth's division, which was still on a ridge about a mile and a half from Falling Waters. The initial attack caught the Confederates by surprise after a long night with little sleep, and hand-to-hand fighting ensued. Kilpatrick attacked again and Buford struck them in their right and rear. Heth's and Pender's divisions lost as many as 2,000 men as prisoners. Brig. Gen. J. Johnston Pettigrew, who had survived Pickett's Charge with a minor hand wound, was mortally wounded at Falling Waters.

The minor success against Heth did not make up for the extreme frustration in the Lincoln administration about allowing Lee to escape. The president was quoted by John Hay as saying, "We had them within our grasp. We had only to stretch forth our hands and they were ours. And nothing I could say or do could make the Army move."

== Shepherdstown and Manassas Gap ==
Although many descriptions of the Gettysburg campaign end with Lee's crossing of the Potomac on July 13–14, the two armies did not take up positions across from each other on the Rappahannock River for almost two weeks and the official reports of the armies include the maneuvering and minor clashes along the way. On July 16 the cavalry brigades of Fitzhugh Lee and Chambliss held the fords on the Potomac at Shepherdstown to prevent crossing by the Federal infantry. The cavalry division under David Gregg approached the fords and the Confederates attacked them, but the Union cavalrymen held their position until dark before withdrawing. Meade called this a "spirited contest."

The Army of the Potomac crossed the Potomac River at Harpers Ferry and Berlin (now named Brunswick) on July 17–18. They advanced along the east side of the Blue Ridge Mountains, trying to interpose themselves between Lee's army and Richmond. On July 23, Meade ordered French's III Corps to cut off the retreating Confederate columns at Front Royal, by forcing passage through Manassas Gap. At dawn, French began his attack with the New York Excelsior Brigade, led by Brig. Gen. Francis B. Spinola, against Brig. Gen. Ambrose R. Wright's brigade of Georgians, under the command of Col. Edward J. Walker of the 3rd Georgia Regiment, defending the pass. The fight was slow at first, with the superior Union force using its numbers to push Walker from his defensive position back through the gap. About 4:30 p.m., a strong Union attack drove Walker's men until they were reinforced by Maj. Gen. Robert E. Rodes's division and artillery. By dusk, the poorly coordinated Union attacks were abandoned. During the night, Confederate forces withdrew into the Luray Valley. On July 24, the Union army occupied Front Royal, but Lee's army was safely beyond pursuit.

== Aftermath ==
The retreat from Gettysburg ended the Gettysburg campaign. The Confederates suffered over 5,000 casualties during the retreat, including more than 1,000 captured at Monterey Pass, 1,000 stragglers captured from the wagon train by Gregg's division, 500 at Cunningham's Crossroads, 1,000 captured at Falling Waters, and 460 cavalrymen and 300 infantry and artillery killed, wounded, and missing during the ten days of skirmishes and battles. There were over 1,000 Union casualties—primarily cavalrymen—including losses of 263 from Kilpatrick's division at Hagerstown and 120 from Buford's division at Williamsport. For the entire campaign, Confederate casualties were approximately 27,000, Union 30,100.

Meade was hampered during the retreat and pursuit not only by his alleged timidity and his willingness to defer to the cautious judgment of his subordinate commanders, but because his army was exhausted. The advance to Gettysburg was swift and tiring, followed by the largest battle of the war. The pursuit of Lee was physically demanding, through inclement weather and over difficult roads much longer than his opponent's. Enlistments expired, causing depletion of his ranks, as did the New York Draft Riots, which occupied thousands of men who could otherwise have reinforced the Army of the Potomac.

Meade was severely criticized for allowing Lee to escape, just as Maj. Gen. George B. McClellan had done after the Battle of Antietam. Under pressure from Lincoln, he launched two campaigns in the fall of 1863—Bristoe and Mine Run—that attempted to defeat Lee. Both were failures. He also suffered humiliation at the hands of his political enemies in front of the Joint Congressional Committee on the Conduct of the War, questioning his actions at Gettysburg and his failure to defeat Lee during the retreat to the Potomac.
