= Monterey Pass =

Mountain pass in Pennsylvania, United States

- aliases: Monterey, Monterey Gap, Monterey Springs
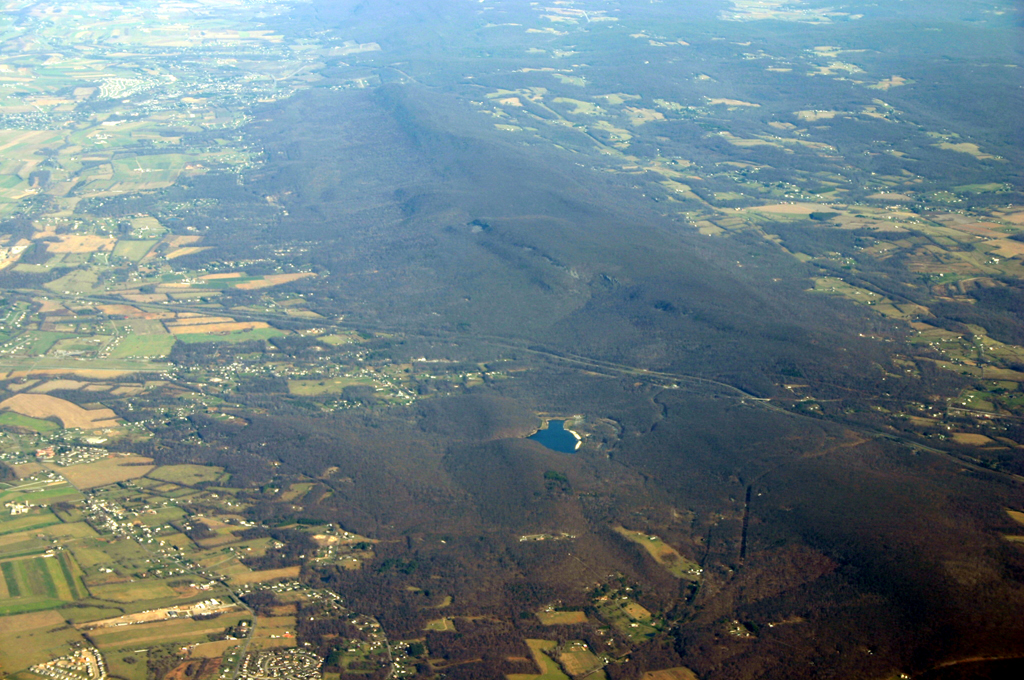
- South Mountain, with Monterey Pass at top of photo.
- Interactive map of Monterey Pass
- Elevation: ~1300 ft
- Traversed by: Old Pennsylvania Route 16

Third Approach
- Location: Washington Township, Franklin County, Pennsylvania
- Range: South Mountain
- Coordinates: 39°44′09″N 77°28′28″W
- Topo map: USGS

Monterey Pass is a 1,300 feet (0.40 km) mountain pass located in Franklin County, southern Pennsylvania.

== Geography ==
The saddle area lies near Happel's Meadow, between Monterey Peak (1,663 ft) and Clermont Crag (1627 ft), in the South Mountain Range of the northern Blue Ridge Mountains System.

Monterey Pass is located near Blue Ridge Summit and the historical Mason–Dixon line.

== History ==
=== Gettysburg Campaign ===
Monterey Pass was the site of the July 1863 Fight at Monterey Pass during the Retreat from Gettysburg in the American Civil War.

The first military engagement at Monterey Pass occurred on June 22, 1863. Captain Robert B. Moorman, commanding Company D of the 14th Virginia Cavalry was dispatched eastward from the area between Greencastle, Pennsylvania, and Hagerstown, Maryland, to obtain horses reportedly available from local Southern sympathizers. After the company passed through Leitersburg, Maryland, and on to Caledonia Furnace; at Monterey the company encountered Bell's Adams County Cavalry and the First Troop, Philadelphia City Cavalry, both temporarily based in Gettysburg. After a very brief skirmish, the Confederate troops withdrew toward Hagerstown, joining General Richard S. Ewell, who was advancing with a larger force.

Previous combat in the area included a June 21 engagement at Fairfield, and subsequent engagements prior to the Battle of Gettysburg included the first combat of Adams County, Pennsylvania, during the Civil War. (Pennsylvania militia at Fountain Dale on June 28) and at Emmitsburg, Maryland, on June 24.

In addition to the July 4–5 Fight at Monterey Pass, July 4 combat in the area included the Skirmish at Fairfield Gap, Pennsylvania, and skirmishes near Emmitsburg MD (9.4 miles east), Zora, Pennsylvania, and Waynesboro, Pennsylvania (6.5 miles west). As late as July 8, Union forces such as Company D, 10th New York Cavalry, were still in the area.

East Cemetery Hill
Tablet 6 of 9

Army of the Potomac
July 4, 1863

First and Second Brigade, First Cavalry Division marched from
Westminster The Reserve Brigade First Cavalry Division from
Gettysburg en route to Frederick Second Brigade Second Cavalry
Division from Westminster via Emmitsburg to Monterey The Third
Brigade Second Cavalry Division from Gettysburg to Hunterstown and the
Third Cavalry Division from Gettysburg via Emmitsburg to Monterey

Fight at Monterey Gap Pennsylvania
Skirmishes at Fairfield Gap Pennsylvania and near Emmitsburg Md

== See also ==
- Blue Ridge Mountains topics
- Monterey Country Club
