= Battle of Boonsboro =

Battle of the American Civil War

Coordinates: 39.5254°N 77.6632°W

- Part of the American Civil War
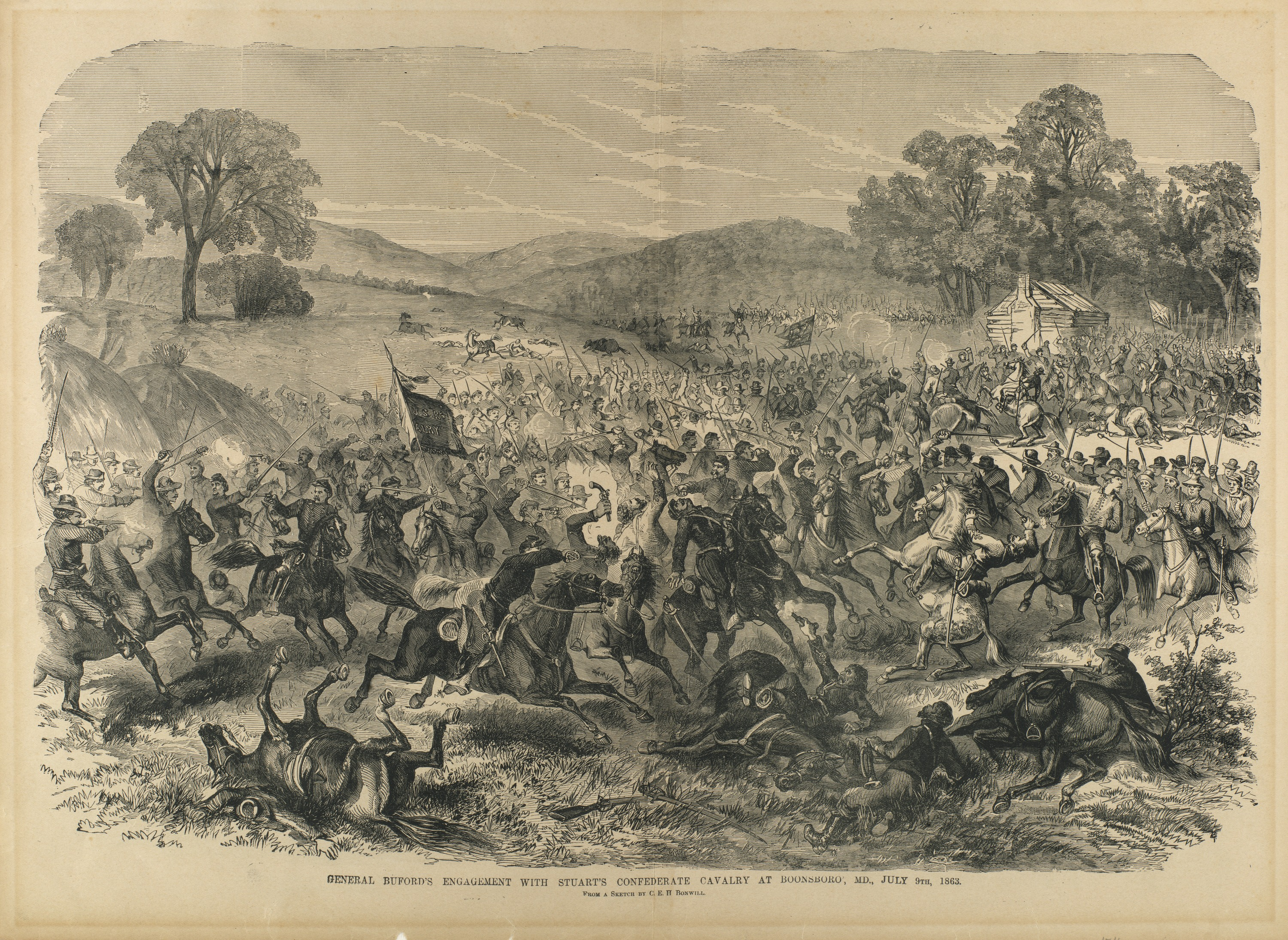
- General Buford's Engagement with Stuart's Confederate Cavalry at Boonsboro, MD. July 9th, 1863 (work by C.E.H. Bonwill, book The Soldier in Our Civil War, 1893)
| Date | July 8, 1863 |
| Location | Washington County, Maryland |
| Result | Inconclusive |

Belligerents
| United States (Union) | CSA (Confederacy) |

Commanders and leaders
| Alfred Pleasonton | J.E.B. Stuart |

Strength
| Divisions | Divisions |

Casualties and losses
- 100

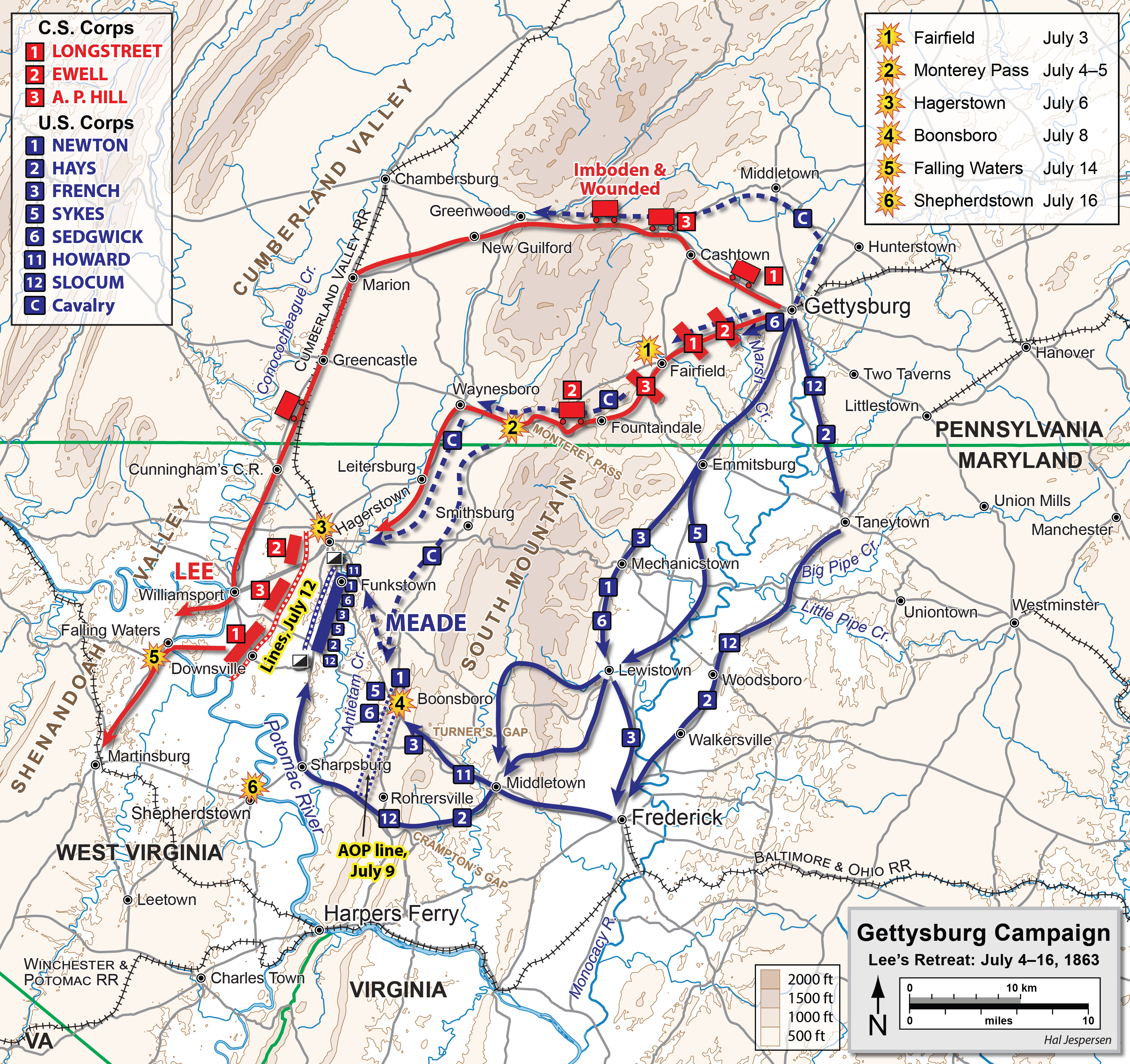
Gettysburg Campaign (July 5–14) Confederate Union

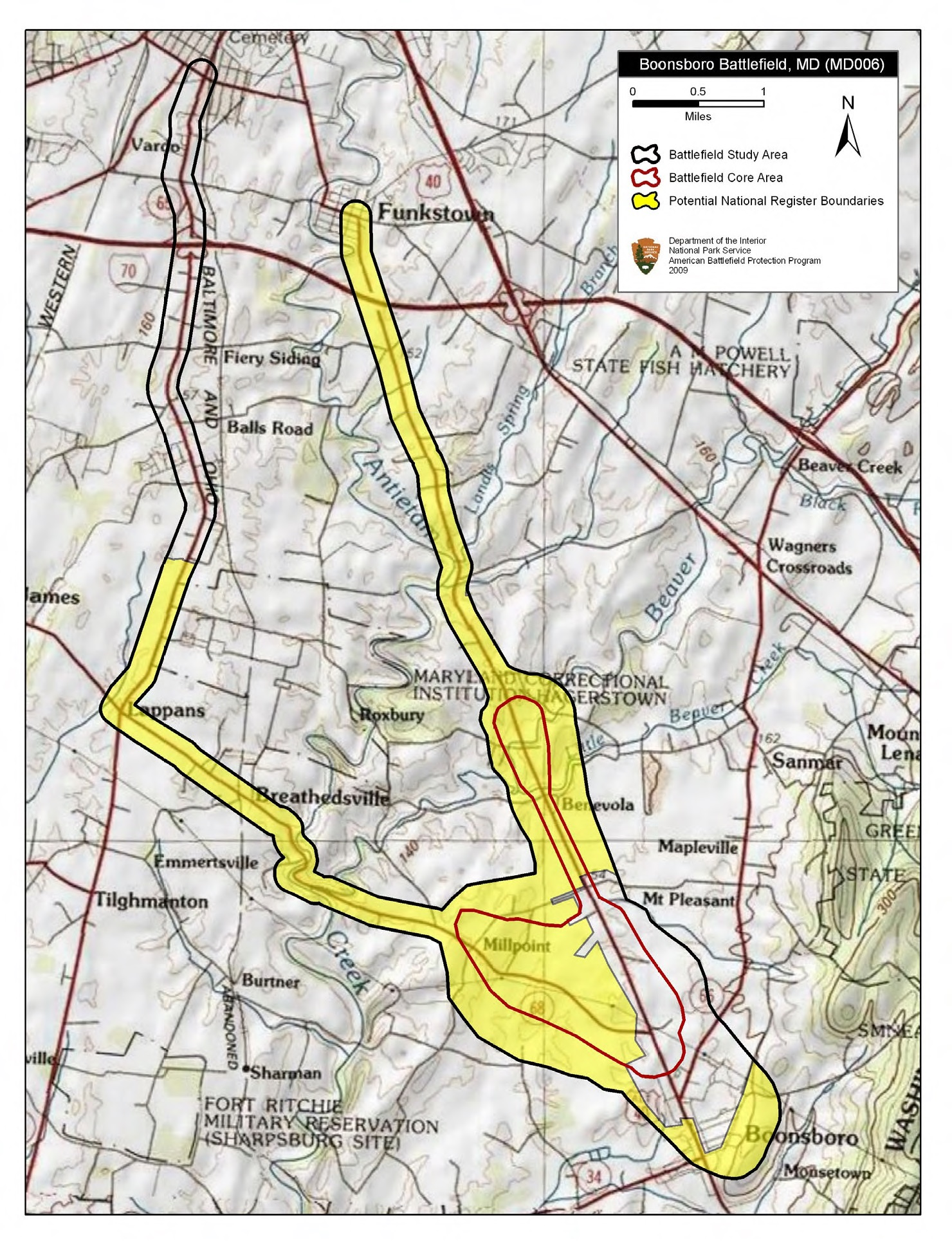
Map of Boonsboro Battlefield core and study areas by the American Battlefield Protection Program.

The Battle of Boonsboro took place on July 8, 1863, in Washington County, Maryland, as part of the Retreat from Gettysburg during the Gettysburg campaign of the American Civil War.

While Gen. Robert E. Lee's Army of Northern Virginia retreated toward Virginia following its defeat in the Battle of Gettysburg, Confederate cavalry held the South Mountain passes. The cavalry fought a rearguard action against elements of the Union 1st and 3rd Cavalry Divisions and supporting infantry. This action was one of a series of successive cavalry engagements around Boonsboro, Hagerstown, and Williamsport.

== Battle ==
Confederate Maj. Gen. J.E.B. Stuart faced a difficult assignment—locate the Union cavalry and prevent it from severing Gen. Lee's avenue of retreat to Williamsport and the Potomac River. The result was the biggest and most sustained cavalry battle in Maryland during the campaign. The Battle of Boonsboro occurred along the National Road on Wednesday, July 8, 1863.

Stuart, with five cavalry brigades, advanced from the direction of Funkstown and Williamsport. He first encountered Federal resistance at Beaver Creek Bridge, 4.5 miles (7.2 km) north of Boonsboro. By 11 a.m., the Confederate cavalry had pushed forward to several mud-soaked fields, where fighting on horseback was nearly impossible, forcing Stuart's troopers and Brig. Gens. H. Judson Kilpatrick's and John Buford's Union cavalry divisions to dismount and slug it out like infantry.

By mid-afternoon, the Union left under Kilpatrick crumbled as the Federals ran low on ammunition under increasing Confederate pressure. Stuart's advanced ended about 7 p.m., however, when Union infantry arrived—the first to engage in battle since Gettysburg. Stuart withdrew north to Funkstown, but he had gained another day for Lee's retreating army. Two days later, he would again delay the Federal pursuit at the Battle of Funkstown.
