= John Buford =

US Army cavalry officer (1826–1863)

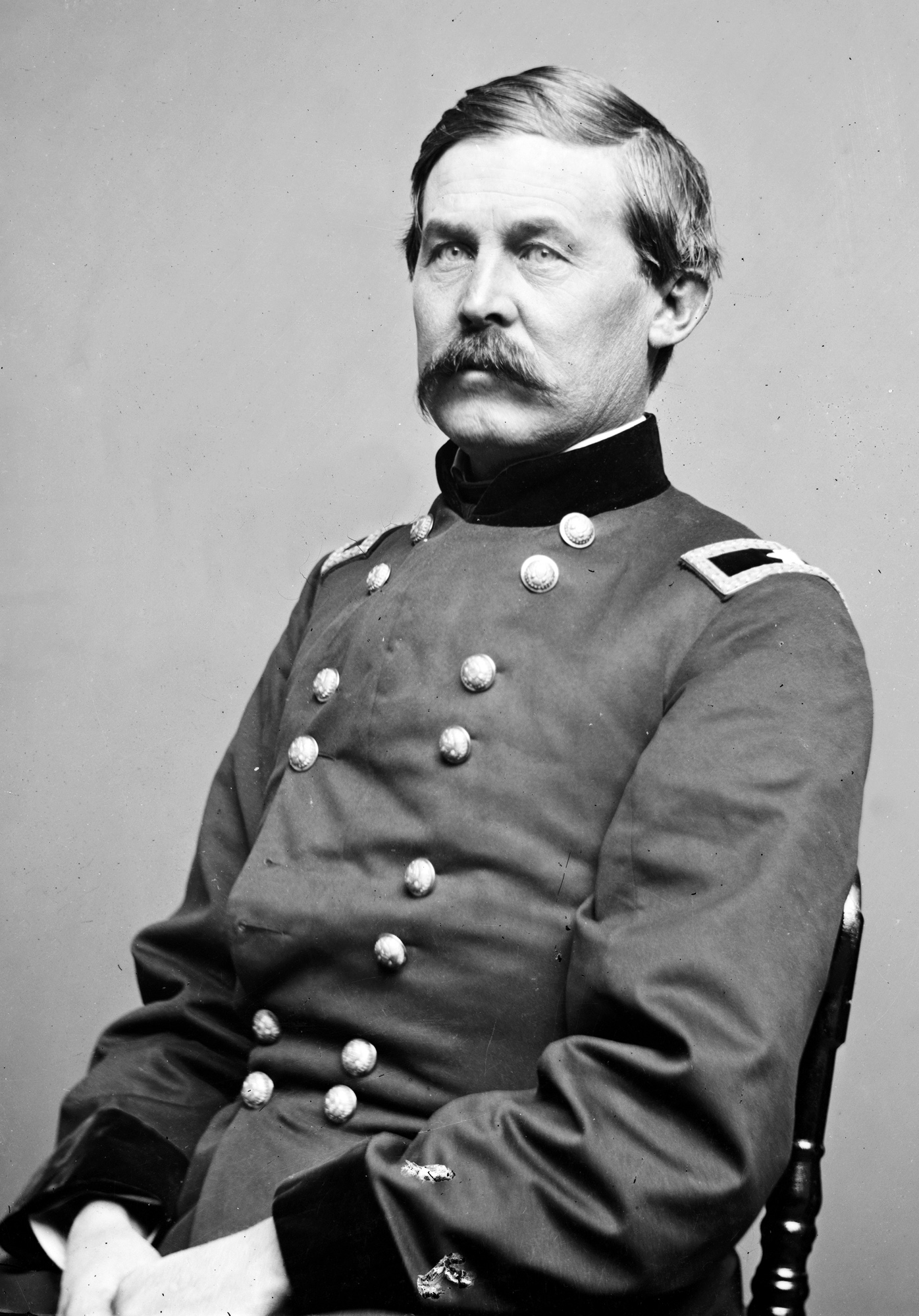
- Buford in 1863
- Born: John Buford Jr. March 4, 1826; Woodford County, Kentucky
- Died: December 16, 1863 (aged 37); Washington, D.C.
- Burial place: West Point Cemetery; United States Military Academy; West Point, New York
- Relatives: Napoleon Bonaparte Buford (half-brother); Abraham Buford (great-uncle); Abraham Buford II (cousin)
- Military career
- Allegiance: United States; Union
- Branch: United States Army; Union Army
- Service years: 1848–1863
- Rank: Major General
- Commands: Chief of Cavalry, Army of the Potomac
- Conflicts: First Sioux War; Battle of Ash Hollow; Utah War; American Civil War; Second Battle of Bull Run; Battle of South Mountain; Battle of Antietam; Battle of Brandy Station; Battle of Upperville; Battle of Gettysburg; Battle of Boonsboro; Battle of Funkstown; Battle of Williamsport; Bristoe Campaign

John Buford Jr. (March 4, 1826 – December 16, 1863) was a United States Army cavalry officer. He fought for the Union during the American Civil War, rising to the rank of major general. Buford is best known for his actions in the first day of the Battle of Gettysburg on July 1, 1863, by identifying Cemetery Hill and Cemetery Ridge as high ground that would be crucial in the impending battle, and by placing vedettes (the cavalry equivalent of "picket lines") to the west and north that delayed the enemy long enough for the Union Army to arrive.

Born in the divided border state of Kentucky, Buford graduated from West Point in 1848. He remained loyal to the United States when the Civil War broke out and fought against the Confederate Army of Northern Virginia as part of the Army of the Potomac. His first command was a cavalry brigade under Major General John Pope. He distinguished himself at Second Bull Run in August 1862, where he was wounded. He also saw action at Antietam in September and during Stoneman's Raid in spring 1863.

Buford's cavalry division played a crucial role in the Gettysburg campaign that summer. Arriving at the small town of Gettysburg, Pennsylvania, on June 30, before the Confederate troops, Buford set up defensive positions. On the morning of July 1, Buford's division was attacked by a Confederate division under the command of Major General Henry Heth. His men held just long enough for Union reinforcements to arrive. After a massive three-day battle, the Union troops emerged victorious. Later, Buford rendered valuable service to the Army, both in the pursuit of Robert E. Lee after the Battle of Gettysburg, and in the Bristoe Campaign that autumn, but his health started to fail, possibly from typhoid. Just before his death at age 37, he received a personal message from President Abraham Lincoln, promoting him to major general of volunteers in recognition of his tactical skill and leadership displayed on the first day of Gettysburg.

== Early years ==
Buford was born in Woodford County, Kentucky, but was raised in Rock Island, Illinois, at the age of eight. John, his father, was a prominent Democratic politician in Illinois and a political opponent of Abraham Lincoln. Buford was of English descent. His family had a long military tradition. John Jr.'s grandfather, Simeon Buford, served in the cavalry during the American Revolutionary War under Henry "Lighthorse" Lee, the father of Robert E. Lee. His great-uncle, Colonel Abraham Buford (of the Battle of Waxhaws), also served in a Virginia regiment. His half-brother, Napoleon Bonaparte Buford, would become a major general in the Union Army, while his cousin, Abraham Buford, would become a cavalry brigadier general in the Confederate States Army.

After attending Knox College in Galesburg, Illinois, for one year, Buford was accepted into the Class of 1848 at the United States Military Academy (West Point). Upperclassmen during Buford's time at West Point included Fitz-John Porter (Class of 1845), George B. McClellan (1846), Thomas J. Jackson (1846), George Pickett (1846), and two future commanders and friends, George Stoneman (1846) and Ambrose Burnside (1847). The Class of 1847 also included A. P. Hill and Henry Heth, two men Buford would face at Gettysburg on the morning of July 1, 1863. Buford and Heth fought together in the U.S. Army in 1855 during the Battle of Ash Hollow in the First Sioux War.

Buford graduated 16th of 38 cadets and was commissioned a brevet second lieutenant in the 1st U.S. Dragoons, transferring the next year to the 2nd U.S. Dragoons. He served in Texas and against the Sioux, including in the Battle of Ash Hollow (also known as the Harney Massacre), on peacekeeping duty in Bleeding Kansas, and in the Utah War in 1858. He was stationed at Fort Crittenden, Utah, from 1859 to 1861. He studied the works of General John Watts de Peyster, who urged that the skirmish line become the new line of battle.

== Civil War ==
Throughout 1860, Buford and his fellow soldiers had lived with talk of secession and the possibility of civil war, until the Pony Express brought word that Fort Sumter had been fired upon in April 1861, confirming secession as fact. As was the case with many West Pointers, Buford had to choose between North and South. Based on his background, Buford had ample reason to join the Confederacy. He was a native Kentuckian, the son of a slave-owning father, and the husband of a woman whose relatives would fight for the South, as would a number of his own. On the other hand, Buford had been educated in the North and come to maturity within the Army. His two most influential professional role models, Colonels William S. Harney and Philip St. George Cooke, were Southerners who elected to remain with the Union and the U.S. Army. He loved his profession and his time on the frontier had snapped the ties that drew other Southerners home.

John Gibbon, a North Carolinian facing the same dilemma, recalled in a post-war memoir the evening that John Buford committed himself to the Union:

One night after the arrival of the mail we were in his (Buford's) room, when Buford said in his slow and deliberate way "I got a letter from the Governor of Kentucky. He sent me word to come to Kentucky at once and I shall have anything I want." With a good deal of anxiety, I (Gibbon) asked "What did you answer, John?" And my relief was great when he replied "I sent him word I was a Captain in the United States Army and I intended to remain one!"

In November 1861, Buford was appointed Assistant Inspector General with the rank of major, and, in July 1862, after having served for several months in the defense of Washington, was raised to the rank of brigadier general of volunteers. In 1862, he was given his first position, under Major General John Pope, as commander of the II Corps Cavalry Brigade of the Union Army of Virginia, which fought with distinction at the Second Battle of Bull Run. Buford personally led a charge late in the battle, but was wounded in the knee by a spent bullet. The injury was painful, but not serious, although some Union newspapers reported that he had been killed. He returned to active service, and served as chief of cavalry to Major Generals George B. McClellan and Ambrose E. Burnside in the Army of the Potomac. Unfortunately, this assignment was nothing more than a staff position, and he chafed for a field command. In McClellan's Maryland Campaign, Buford was in the battles of South Mountain and Antietam, replacing Brigadier General George Stoneman on McClellan's staff. Under Major General Joseph Hooker in 1863, however, Buford was given the Reserve Brigade of regular cavalry in the 1st Division, Cavalry Corps of the Army of the Potomac.

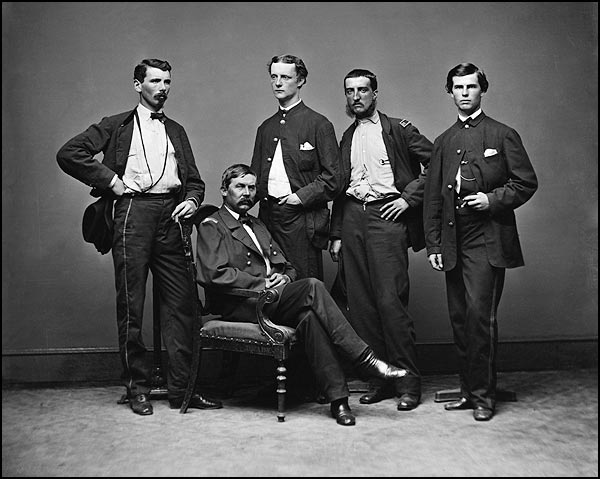
August 1863 – General Buford (seated) & staff

After the Battle of Chancellorsville, Major General Alfred Pleasonton was given command of the Cavalry Corps, although Hooker later agreed that Buford would have been the better choice. Buford first led his new division at the Battle of Brandy Station, which was virtually an all-cavalry engagement, and then again at the Battle of Upperville.

In the Gettysburg campaign, Buford, who had been promoted to command of the 1st Division, is credited with selecting the field of battle at Gettysburg. On June 30, Buford's command rode into the small town of Gettysburg. Very soon, Buford realized that he was facing a superior force of Confederates to his front and set about creating a defense against the advance. He was acutely aware of the tactical importance of holding the high ground south of Gettysburg, and so he did, beginning one of the most important battles in American military history. His skillful defensive troop dispositions, coupled with the bravery and tenacity of his dismounted men, allowed the I Corps, under Major General John F. Reynolds, time to come up in support and thus maintain a Union foothold in tactically important positions. Despite Lee's barrage attack of 140 cannons and a final infantry attack on the third day of the battle, the Union army won a strategic victory. The importance of Buford's leadership and tactical foresight on July 1 cannot be overstated in its contribution to this victory. Afterwards, Buford's troopers were sent by Pleasonton to Emmitsburg, Maryland, to resupply and refit, an ill-advised decision that uncovered the Union left flank.

In the Retreat from Gettysburg, Buford pursued the Confederates to Warrenton, Virginia, and was afterwards engaged in many operations in central Virginia, rendering particularly valuable service in covering Major General George Meade's retrograde movement in the October 1863 Bristoe Campaign.

The hero at Oak Ridge was John Buford ... he not only showed the rarest tenacity, but his personal capacity made his cavalry accomplish marvels, and rival infantry in their steadfastness ... Glorious John Buford!

— Maj. Gen. John Watts de Peyster on Buford's Dragoon tactics

Buford despised the false flourish and noisy parade of the charlatans of his service. He avoided too, perhaps, the proper praise due his glorious actions, his bravery and dash, without ostentation or pride, his coolness and able management and above all, the care of his men endeared him to all.

— Theo. F. Rodenbough, Brevet Brigadier General

== Death and legacy ==
By mid-December, it was obvious that Buford was sick, possibly from contracting typhoid, and he took respite at the Washington home of his good friend, General George Stoneman. On December 16, Stoneman initiated the proposal that Buford be promoted to major general, and President Abraham Lincoln assented, writing as follows: "I am informed that General Buford will not survive the day. It suggests itself to me that he will be made Major General for distinguished and meritorious service at the Battle of Gettysburg." Informed of the promotion, Buford inquired doubtfully, "Does he mean it?" When assured the promotion was genuine, he replied simply, "It is too late, now I wish I could live."

In the last hours, Buford was attended by his aide, future Battle of the Little Big Horn officer, Captain Myles Keogh, and by Edward, his black servant. Also present were Lieutenant Colonel A. J. Alexander and General Stoneman. His wife Pattie was traveling from Rock Island, Illinois, but would not arrive in time. Near the end, he became delirious and began admonishing Edward, but then, in a moment of clarity, called for the man and apologized: "Edward, I hear that I have been scolding you. I did not know what I was doing. You have been a faithful servant, Edward."

John Buford died at 2 p.m., December 16, 1863, while Myles Keogh held him in his arms. His final reported words were "Put guards on all the roads, and don't let the men run to the rear."

On December 20, memorial services were held at the New York Avenue Presbyterian Church, a church on the corner of H. Street and New York Avenue in Washington, D.C. President Lincoln was among the mourners. Buford's wife was unable to attend due to illness. The pallbearers included Generals Casey, Heintzelman, Sickles, Schofield, Hancock, Doubleday, and Warren. General Stoneman commanded the escort in a procession that included "Grey Eagle," Buford's old white horse that he rode at Gettysburg.

No more to follow his daring form
Or see him dash through the battle's storm
No more with him to ride down the foe
And behold his falchion's crushing blow
Nor hear his voice, like a rushing blast
As rider and steed went charging past ... Buford is dead!

— Philadelphia Inquirer, December 21, 1863

After the service, two of Buford's staff, Captains Keogh and Wadsworth, escorted his body to West Point, where he was buried alongside fellow Gettysburg hero Lieutenant Alonzo Cushing, who had died defending the "high ground" (Cemetery Ridge) that Buford had chosen. In 1865, a 25-foot obelisk style monument was erected over his grave, financed by members of his old division. The officers of his staff published a resolution that set forth the esteem in which he was held by those in his command:

... we, the staff officers of the late Major General John Buford, fully appreciating his merits as a gentleman, soldier, commander, and patriot, conceive his death to be an irreparable loss to the cavalry arm of the service. That we have been deprived of a friend and leader whose sole ambition was our success, and whose chief pleasure was in administering to the welfare, safety and happiness of the officers and men of his command.
... That to his unwearied exertions in the many responsible positions which he has occupied, the service at large is indebted for much of its efficiency, and in his death the cavalry has lost firm friend and most ardent advocate. That we are called to mourn the loss of one who was ever to us as the kindest and tenderest father, and that our fondest desire and wish will ever be to perpetuate his memory and emulate his greatness."

In 1866, a military fort established on the Missouri-Yellowstone confluence in what is now North Dakota, was named Fort Buford after the general. The community of Buford, Wyoming, was renamed in the general's honor. The town, nearly uninhabited, was sold at auction for $900,000 on April 5, 2012, to an unnamed Vietnamese buyer by its owner, who had served in the U.S. military in 1968–1969.

In 1895, a bronze statue of Buford designed by artist James E. Kelly was dedicated on the Gettysburg Battlefield.

The M8 Armored Gun System, an American light tank canceled in 1996, is sometimes referred to as the "Buford" in his honor.

== In popular media ==
Buford was portrayed by Sam Elliott in the 1993 film Gettysburg, based on Michael Shaara's novel The Killer Angels.

Buford is a character in the alternate history novel Gettysburg: A Novel of the Civil War, written by Newt Gingrich and William Forstchen.

== See also ==
- List of American Civil War generals (Union)
