= J. Johnston Pettigrew =

American Confederate general

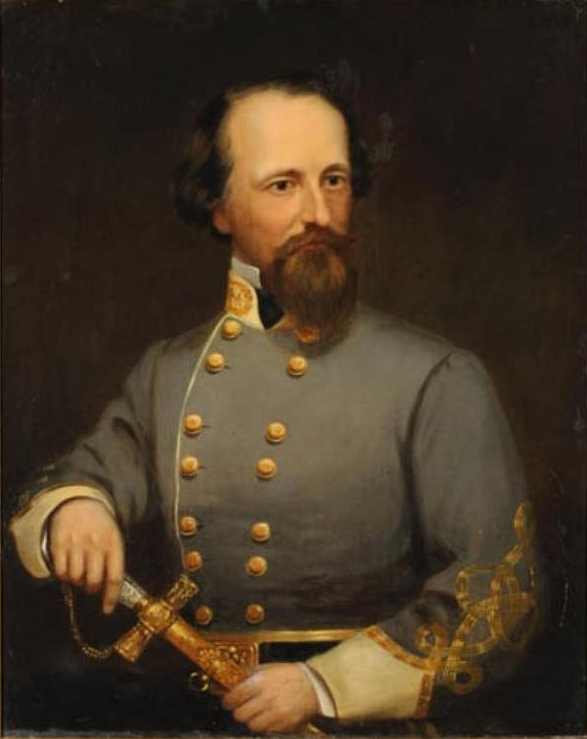
- Portrait by William Garl Browne, 1864.
- Born: July 4, 1828; Tyrrell County, North Carolina
- Died: July 17, 1863 (aged 35); Bunker Hill, West Virginia
- Education: University of North Carolina at Chapel Hill
- Relatives: James L. Petigru (uncle)
- Military career
- Allegiance: Confederate States
- Branch: Confederate States Army
- Service years: 1861–63
- Rank: Brigadier General
- Unit: Hampton's Legion
- Commands: 1st SC Militia Rifle Regiment; 22nd NC Infantry; Pettigrew's Brigade; Pettigrew's Division
- Conflicts: American Civil War; Battle of Seven Pines (WIA) (POW); Battle of Fort Anderson; Battle of Gettysburg; Battle of Williamsport (DOW)

James Johnston Pettigrew (July 4, 1828 – July 17, 1863) was an American writer, lawyer, and soldier. He served in the army of the Confederate States of America, fighting in the 1862 Peninsula Campaign and played a prominent role in the Battle of Gettysburg. Despite starting the Gettysburg campaign commanding a brigade, Pettigrew took over command of his division after the division's original commander, Henry Heth, was wounded. In this role, Pettigrew was one of three division commanders in the disastrous assault known as Pickett's Charge on the final day of Gettysburg. He was wounded, in the right hand, during the Pickett-Pettigrew Charge on July 3, 1863, and was later mortally wounded during the Union Confederate rearguard action while the Confederates retreated to Virginia near Falling Waters, Virginia (now West Virginia), on July 14, dying several days thereafter on July 17, 1863.

== Early years ==
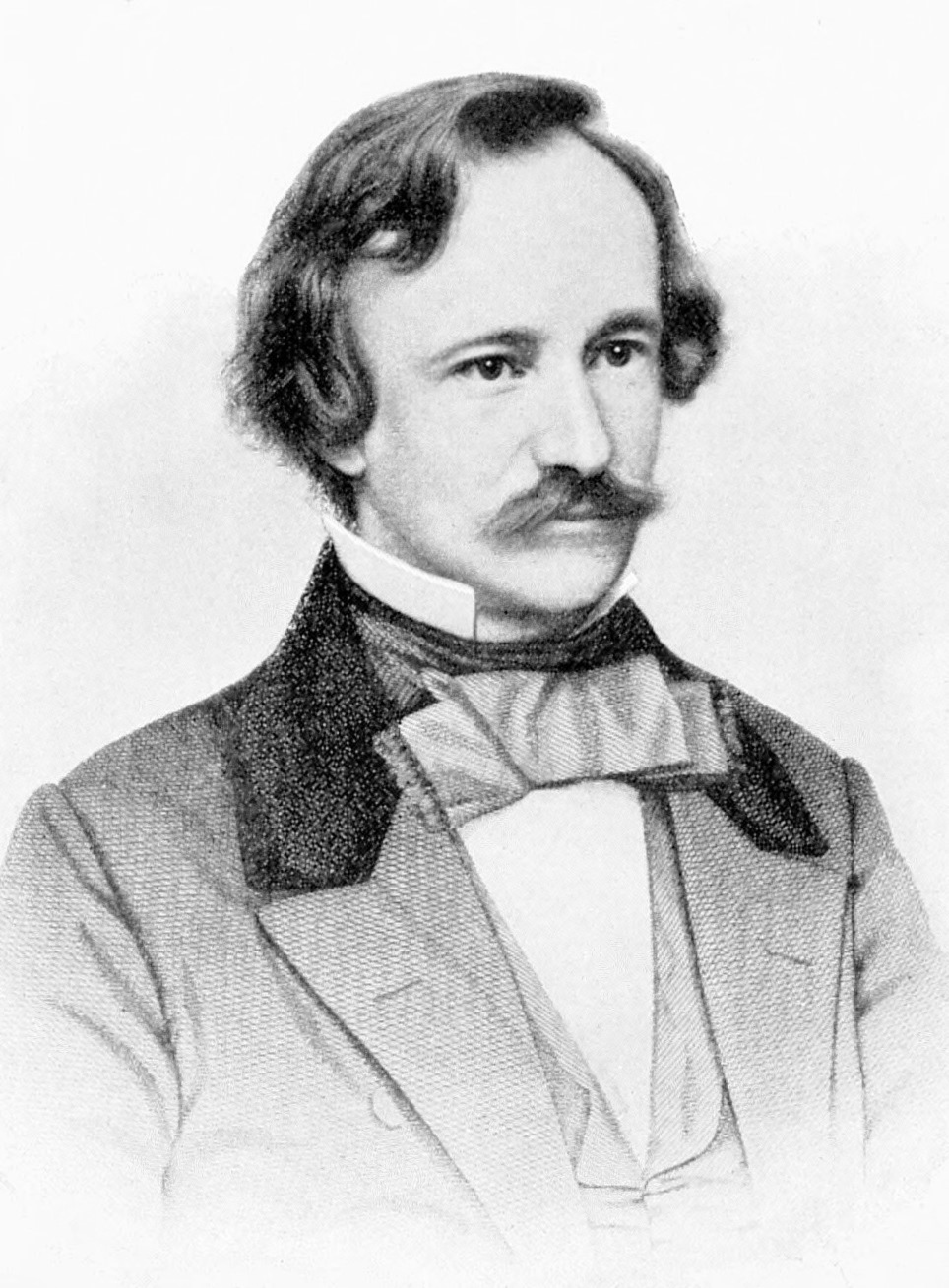
Pettigrew circa 1855

Johnston Pettigrew was born at his family's estate, "Bonarva," in Tyrrell County, North Carolina, on July 4, 1828. His father was from a wealthy family of French Huguenot background. One of Pettigrew's cousins, John Gibbon, would later become a major general for the Union during the Civil War. When he was fifteen, Pettigrew enrolled at the University of North Carolina at Chapel Hill, where he had a distinguished academic career. He earned praise for his achievements from President James K. Polk, who appointed him an assistant professor at the United States Naval Observatory. Pettigrew studied law, traveled to Europe, and eventually moved to Charleston, South Carolina, where he worked in the legal field with his uncle, James Louis Petigru. He was also an author, writing a book about the culture of Spain titled Notes on Spain and the Spaniards in the Summer of 1859, With a Glance at Sardinia.

Returning to the United States, Pettigrew was elected to the South Carolina House of Representatives in 1856. While in office, he presented a report opposing the resumption of the international slave trade, which, along with his participation as a second in a duel, lead to Pettigrew losing his reelection attempt. Believing that civil war in the United States was inevitable and that the war would be long, rather than short as most expected, Pettigrew was active in militia affairs. He also traveled to Europe in 1859 to participate in the Second Italian War of Independence but saw no combat. In November 1860, Pettigrew became a colonel in a South Carolina militia unit. After the secession of South Carolina, Pettigrew became a military aide to the state's governor. Pettigrew ordered the occupation of Castle Pinckney and was stationed with the South Carolina forces at Charleston Harbor through the Battle of Fort Sumter in April 1861.

== Civil War ==
When war began, Pettigrew joined the Hampton Legion as a private. In July 1861, he was elected colonel of the 22nd North Carolina Infantry Regiment. Confederate President Jefferson Davis urged him to accept higher command, but he declined because of his lack of military experience. Despite this inexperience, Pettigrew was promoted to brigadier general by Jefferson Davis during the lead-up to the Peninsula Campaign.

=== Peninsula Campaign ===
During the Peninsula Campaign in the summer of 1862, Pettigrew was severely wounded at the Battle of Seven Pines. He was hit by a Minié ball that damaged his throat, windpipe, and shoulder. Pettigrew nearly bled to death, and while lying wounded, he received another bullet wound in the arm and was bayoneted in the right leg. Believing his wounds to be fatal, Pettigrew refused to be taken from the field. However, he recovered consciousness as a Union prisoner of war. Exchanged two months later, the general recovered from his wounds, spent the fall commanding a brigade in Maj. Gen. Daniel Harvey Hill's division around Richmond, and in the winter commanded a brigade in North Carolina and southern Virginia. In mid-March 1863, Pettigrew led attacking Confederate troops in an unsuccessful assault in the Battle of Fort Anderson. He returned to his North Carolina brigade just in time to begin the Gettysburg campaign in June 1863.

=== Gettysburg Campaign ===
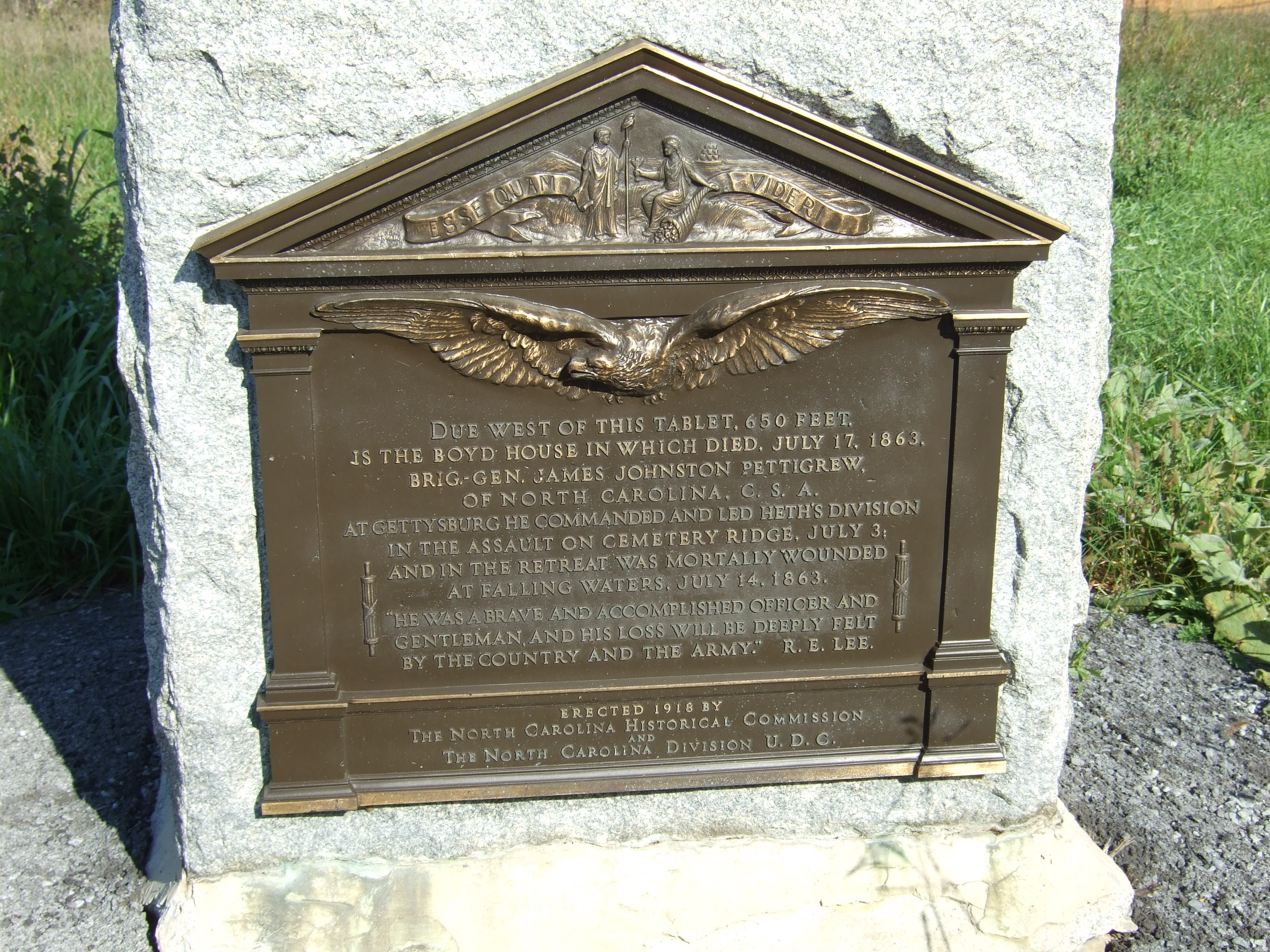
Bronze plaque commemorating the site of Pettigrew's death near Bunker Hill, West Virginia

The Confederate War Department had assigned Pettigrew's Brigade to Gen. Robert E. Lee's Army of Northern Virginia, and Pettigrew traveled northward to join Lee's army. Pettigrew's brigade, along with the brigades of James Jay Archer, John M. Brockenbrough, and Joseph R. Davis, was assigned to Major General Henry Heth's division of Lt. Gen. A. P. Hill's Third Corps. Both Heth's division and Hill's corps were new organizations, having been created as part of Lee's reorganization following the death of Stonewall Jackson. Pettigrew's Brigade was the strongest in Heth's division. Freshly uniformed and armed with rifles from state military depots, his regiments presented a fine military appearance during the march through Maryland and Pennsylvania. Some of his regimental officers were also members of the North Carolina planter aristocracy, including Colonel Collett Leventhorpe leading the 11th North Carolina Infantry and twenty-one-year-old Harry Burgwyn at the head of the 26th North Carolina Regiment, the largest Confederate regiment at Gettysburg. Not having been in serious combat for nearly a year, his brigade mustered a strength over 2,500 officers and men.

Pettigrew's Brigade tangled with the Iron Brigade on July 1, 1863, at the McPherson and Herbst farms to the west of Gettysburg, where all four of his regiments suffered devastating losses—over 40 percent—but were successful in driving the Union forces off of McPherson's Ridge. That afternoon, General Heth suffered a head wound that kept him out of action, and Pettigrew took over command of the battered division.

On July 3, 1863, Gen. Lee selected Pettigrew's division to march at the left of Maj. Gen. George Pickett's in the famous infantry assault popularly known as Pickett's Charge. Pettigrew's old brigade, now commanded by James K. Marshall, had been roughly handled on the first day of the battle, and was not in good condition for the charge.

Pettigrew's division ran into a heavy fire from Union general Alexander Hays' division, which was posted on Cemetery Ridge. Birkett Fry, now commanding James Archer's brigade was wounded, Marshall was killed. Pettigrew's division suffered heavy casualties and were unable to break Hays' line. The division was driven off, and Pettigrew had his horse shot out from under him, requiring him to lead his division on foot. Pettigrew also suffered a painful arm wound.

During the Confederate retreat from Gettysburg, Pettigrew remained in command until Heth recovered. Stopped by the flooded Potomac River at Falling Waters, West Virginia, Pettigrew's brigade (temporarily combined with Archer's former brigade) was deployed as a rear guard unit. Union cavalry probed the southern defenses throughout the night as Lee's army crossed the pontoon bridges into West Virginia. On the morning of July 14, 1863, Pettigrew's brigade was one of the last Confederate units still north of the Potomac River when the Union attacked his position. On foot and in the front line, Pettigrew was directing his soldiers when he was shot by a Union cavalryman from the Michigan Brigade at close range, the bullet striking him in the abdomen. He was immediately carried to the rear and across the Potomac, having refused to be left in federal hands. He died three days later at Edgewood Manor plantation near Bunker Hill, West Virginia, likely due to peritonitis. His brigade, which lost an estimated 56% casualties, had been ruined as an effective combat organization.

== Legacy ==
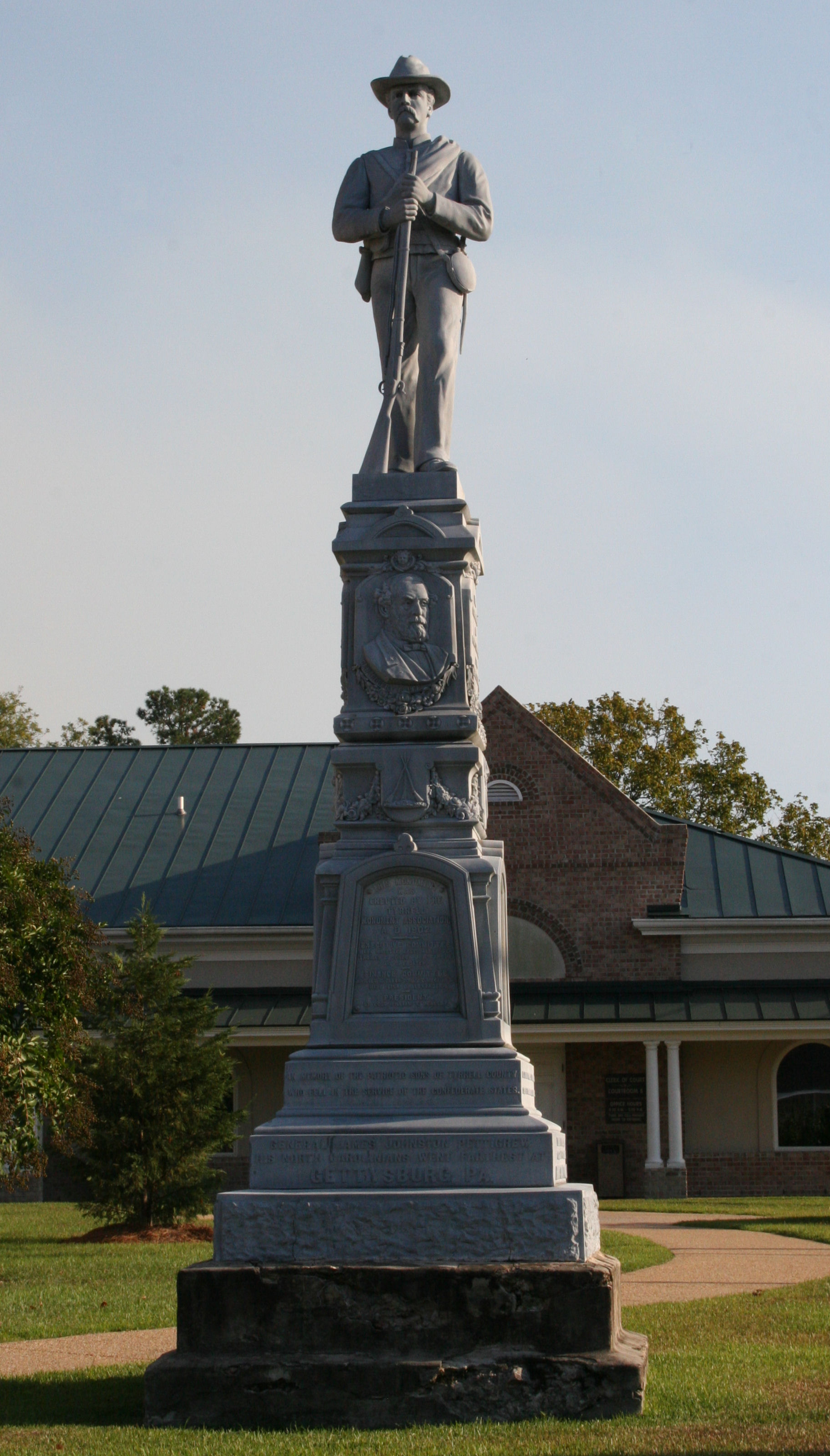
Tyrrell County Confederate Monument noting the death of General J. Johnston Pettigrew

An official day of mourning was held for him in North Carolina. His death also affected Lee, who remarked: "The army has lost a brave soldier and the Confederacy an accomplished officer." General Pettigrew's body was returned to North Carolina and interred at his family estate, "Bonarva", which is now part of Pettigrew State Park in Washington and Tyrrell Counties.

== See also ==
- List of American Civil War generals (Confederate)

== Bibliography ==
- Busey, John W., and David G. Martin. Regimental Strengths and Losses at Gettysburg. 4th ed. Hightstown, NJ: Longstreet House, 2005. ISBN 0-944413-67-6.
- Gottfried, Bradley M. Brigades of Gettysburg. New York: Da Capo Press, 2002. ISBN 0-306-81175-8.
- Hess, Earl J. (2002). Lee's Tar Heels: The Pettigrew-Kirkland-MacRae Brigade. Chapel Hill, North Carolina: University of North Carolina Press. ISBN 0-8078-2687-1.
- Sears, Stephen W. (2004). Gettysburg. Boston/New York: Mariner Books. ISBN 978-0-618-48538-3.
- Tagg, Larry. The Generals of Gettysburg. Campbell, CA: Savas Publishing, 1998. ISBN 1-882810-30-9.
- Trotter, William R. (1989). Ironclads and Columbiads: The Civil War in North Carolina: The Coast. Winston-Salem, North Carolina: John F. Blair. ISBN 0-89587-088-6.
- U.S. War Department. The War of the Rebellion: a Compilation of the Official Records of the Union and Confederate Armies. Washington, DC: U.S. Government Printing Office, 1880–1901.
- Warner, Ezra J. (1959). Generals in Gray: Lives of the Confederate Commanders (1st ed.). Baton Rouge: Louisiana State University Press. OCLC 445052.
- Welsh, Jack D. (1995). Medical Histories of Confederate Generals. Kent, Ohio: Kent State University Press. ISBN 0-8733-8505-5.

=== Further reading ===
- Wilson, Clyde N. Carolina Cavalier: The Life and Mind of James Johnston Pettigrew. Athens: University of Georgia Press, 1990. ISBN 978-0-8203-1201-9.
- Gragg, Rod. Covered With Glory: The 26th North Carolina Infantry at Gettysburg. New York: HarperCollins, 2000. ISBN 978-0-06-017445-3.
- Stewart, George R. (1959). Pickett's Charge: A Microhistory of the Final Attack at Gettysburg, July 3, 1863. Boston: Houghton Mifflin. LCCN 59-8864.
- Trescot, William Henry. Memorial of the Life of J. Johnston Pettigrew: Brigadier General of the Confederate States Army. Charleston, SC: J. Russell, 1870. OCLC 3557938.
