= Monterey Country Club =

Historic golf course in Pennsylvania

- Monterey Country Club postcard

- Location within Pennsylvania
- 39°44′02″N 77°28′17″W

Club information
- Location: 12579 Monterey Lane; Blue Ridge Summit, Pennsylvania, U.S.
- Established: Prior to 1885
- Owner: Monterey Country Club, Inc.

The Monterey Country Club, which was built before 1885, is home to one of the oldest golf courses in the United States. The club sits just below the peaks of 1,720 Mt. Dunlap and 1,365 Monterey Peak in Blue Ridge Summit, Pennsylvania and is less than one mile (1.6 km) from the Mason–Dixon line and about 8 miles (13 km) away from Camp David.

== History and notable features ==
This club has served as a summer retreat for many Washingtonians, and has golf, tennis, swimming, dining and clubhouse facilities. American Presidents Woodrow Wilson, Calvin Coolidge and Dwight D. Eisenhower all played the Monterey Country Club course. In 1896, Wallis Simpson was born in Square Cottage next to the old Monterey Inn directly across the road from first green. She later married Prince Edward, Duke of Windsor and became the Duchess of Windsor.

The Monterey Country Club sits upon 37 acres (150,000 m^{2}) that were once part of a mountain swamp that was the site of military action during the civil war. At the time of the Gettysburg campaign of 1863, there were several cavalry skirmishes in and around the area, including in or near Emmitsburg, Maryland, Fountaindale, and Monterey Pass, where the club sits.

On June 22, the first skirmish occurred along the Monterey Mountain pass near Blue Ridge Summit. An armed civilian militia encountered a detachment of Confederates under the command of General Albert G. Jenkins. The militia was forced to retreat after a very brief skirmish. General Jenkins and his Confederate troops withdrew toward Hagerstown joining General Richard S. Ewell, who was advancing with a larger force.

Following the Battle of Gettysburg, the Confederate Army retreated via Emmitsburg. On July 5, General J. E. B. Stuart's soldiers were engaged in some small skirmishes with General George Armstrong Custer's Federal soldiers as he made his way back to General Robert E. Lee's army. The mountain swamp at Monterey Pass bogged down Stuart and the Army of Northern Virginia as they retreated. The Monterey Country Club sits upon 37 acres (150,000 m^{2}) that were once part of that swamp.
