= Battle of Williamsport =

Battle of the American Civil War

Coordinates: 39°38′N 77°43′W

- Part of the American Civil War
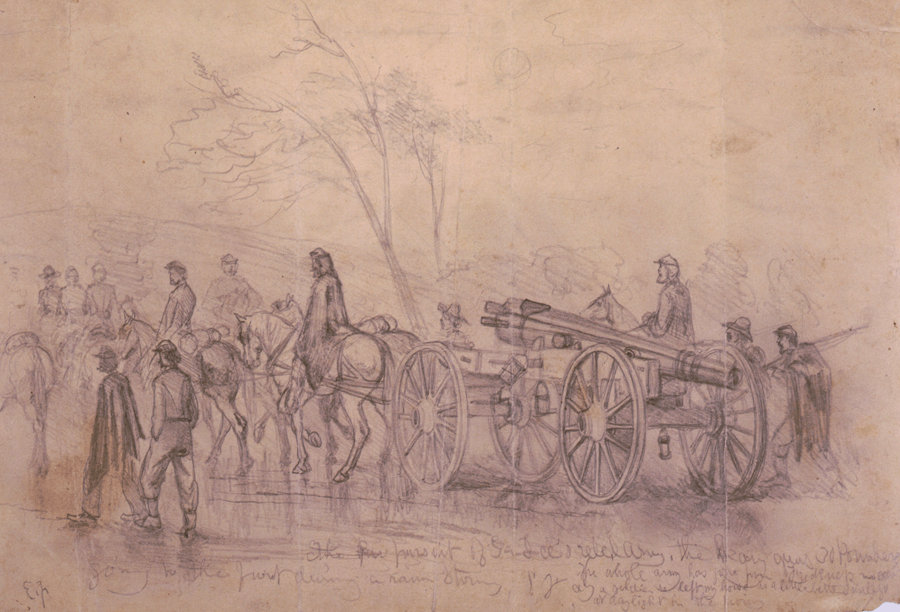
- The pursuit of Gen. Lee's rebel army by Edwin Forbes
Date	July 6–16, 1863
Location	Washington County, Maryland
Result	Inconclusive

Belligerents
United States (Union)	(Confederate States of America) CSA (Confederacy)

Commanders and leaders
George G. Meade	Robert E. Lee

Units involved
Army of the Potomac	Army of Northern Virginia

Strength
Divisions	Divisions

Casualties and losses
- 1,760

The Battle of Williamsport, also known as the Battle of Hagerstown or Falling Waters, took place from July 6 to July 16, 1863, in Washington County, Maryland, as part of the Gettysburg campaign of the American Civil War. It is not to be confused with the fighting at Hoke's Run which was also known as the Battle of Falling Waters.

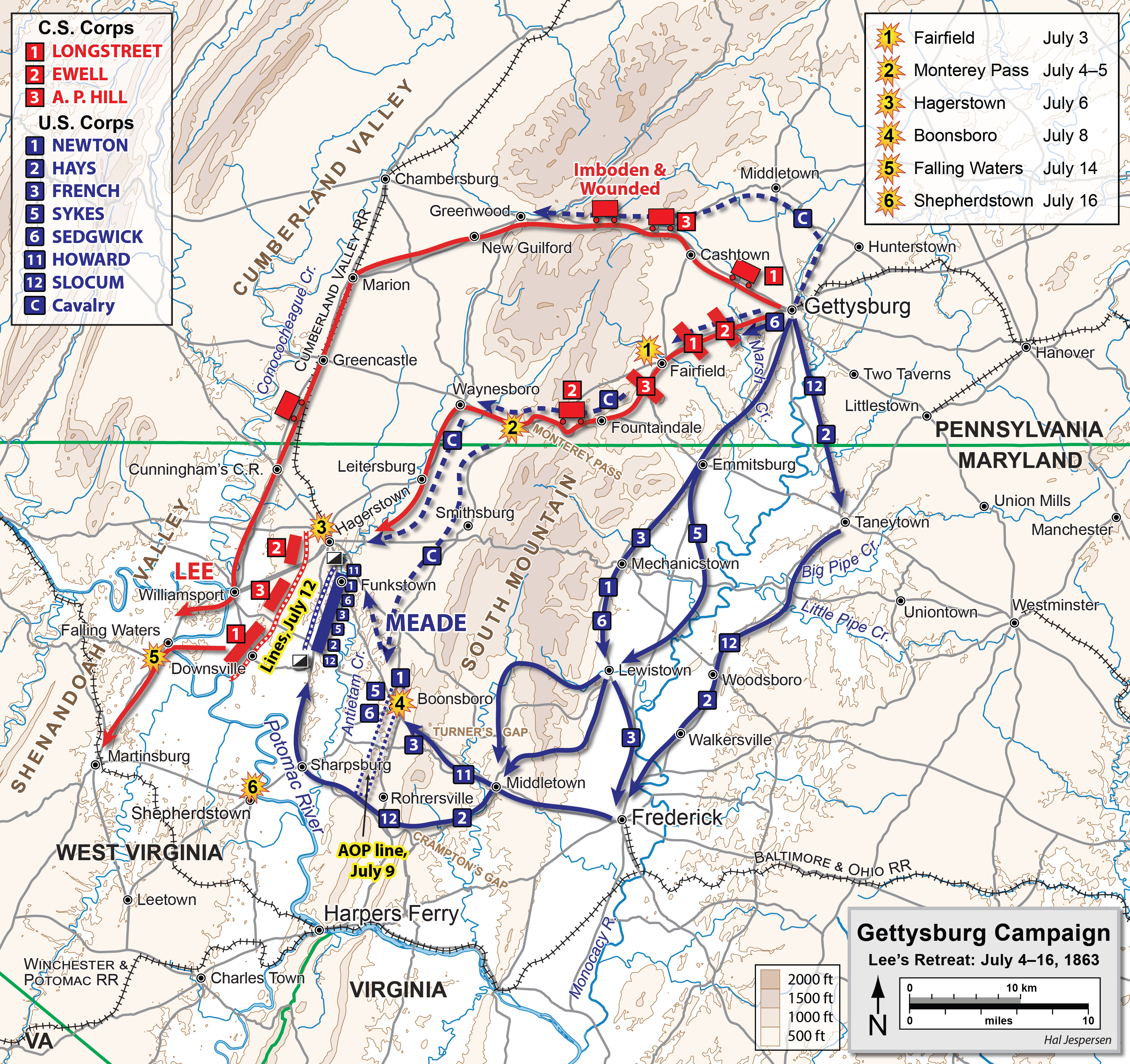
Gettysburg Campaign (July 5–14, 1863) Confederate Union

During the night of July 4–July 5, Gen. Robert E. Lee's battered Confederate army began its retreat from Gettysburg, moving southwest on the Fairfield Road toward Hagerstown and Williamsport, screened by Maj. Gen. J.E.B. Stuart's cavalry. The Union infantry followed cautiously the next day, converging on Middletown, Maryland.

By July 7, Brig. Gen. John D. Imboden stopped Brig. Gen. John Buford's Union cavalry from occupying Williamsport and destroying Confederate trains. On July 6, Brig. Gen. Judson Kilpatrick's cavalry division drove two Confederate cavalry brigades through Hagerstown before being forced to retire by the arrival of the rest of Stuart's command. Lee's infantry reached the rain-swollen Potomac River but could not cross, the pontoon bridge having been destroyed by a cavalry raid.

On July 11, Lee entrenched in a line protecting the river crossings at Williamsport and waited for Maj. Gen. George G. Meade's Army of the Potomac to advance. On July 12, Meade reached the vicinity and probed the Confederate line. On July 13, skirmishing was heavy along the lines as Meade positioned his forces for an attack. In the meantime, the river fell enough to allow the construction of a new bridge, and Lee's army began crossing the river after dark on the 13th.

On the morning of July 14, Kilpatrick's and Buford's cavalry divisions approached from the north and east respectively. Before allowing Buford to gain a position on the flank and rear, Kilpatrick attacked the rearguard division of Maj. Gen. Henry Heth, taking more than 500 prisoners. Confederate Brig. Gen. J. Johnston Pettigrew was mortally wounded in the fight.

On July 16, Brig. Gen. David McM. Gregg's cavalry approached Shepherdstown where the brigades of Brig. Gens. Fitzhugh Lee and John R. Chambliss, supported by Col. Milton J. Ferguson's brigade, held the Potomac River fords against the Union infantry. Fitzhugh Lee and Chambliss attacked Gregg, who held out against several attacks and sorties, fighting sporadically until nightfall, when he withdrew.

== Preservation ==
The American Battlefield Trust and its partners have preserved 3.5 acres of the battlefield at Williamsport through mid-2023.

== Gallery ==
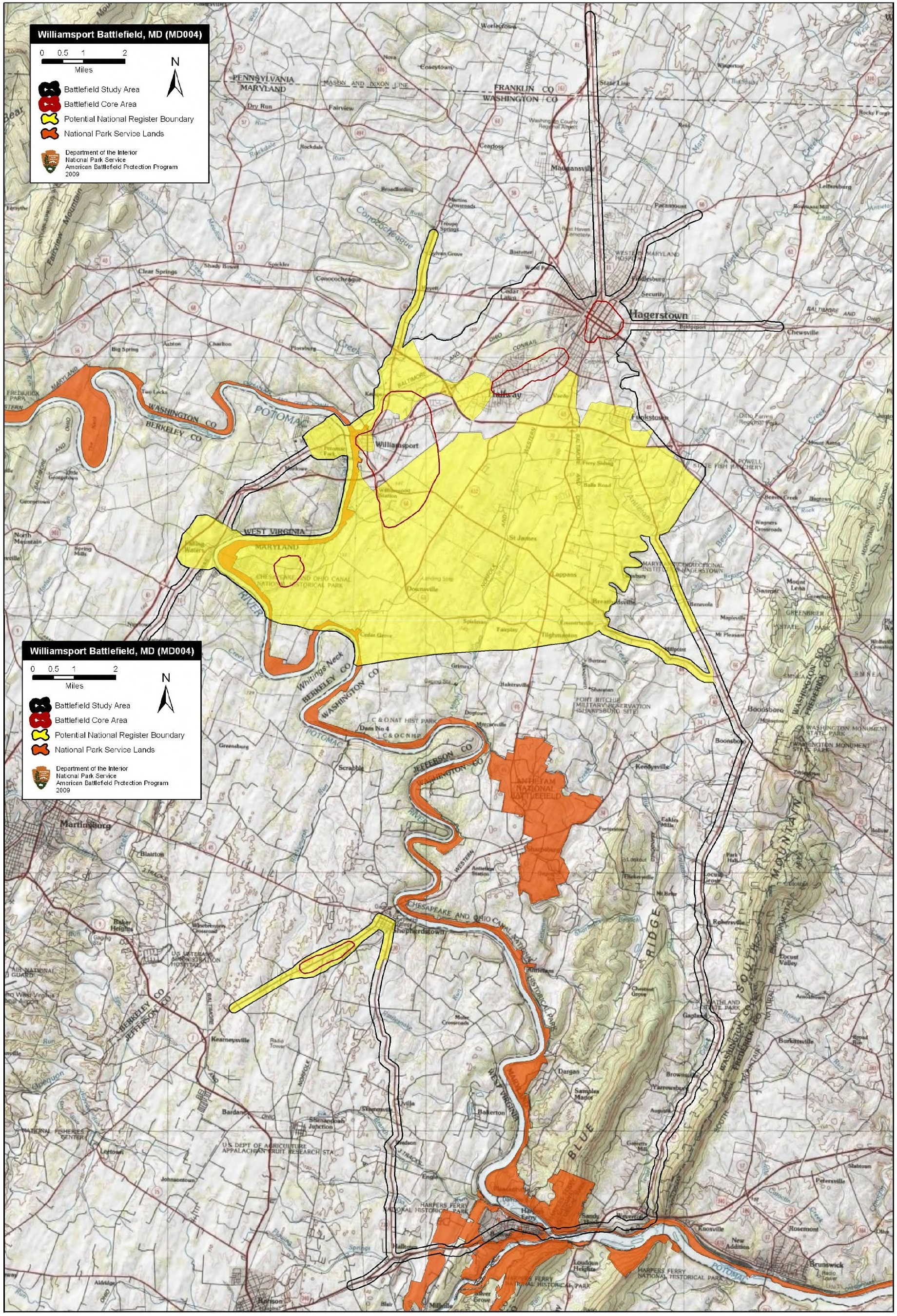
Battlefield core and study areas by the ABPP.
