= Battle of Funkstown =

Battle of the American Civil War

Coordinates: 39.60592°N 77.700462°W

Second Battle of Funkstown
- Part of the American Civil War
| Date | July 10, 1863 |
| Location | Funkstown, Maryland |
| Result | Confederate victory |

Belligerents
| United States (Union) | (Confederate States of America) CSA (Confederacy) |

Commanders and leaders
| John Buford | J.E.B. Stuart |

Strength
| 1 cavalry division 1 infantry brigade | 1 cavalry division 1 infantry brigade |

Casualties and losses
- 479 (both sides)

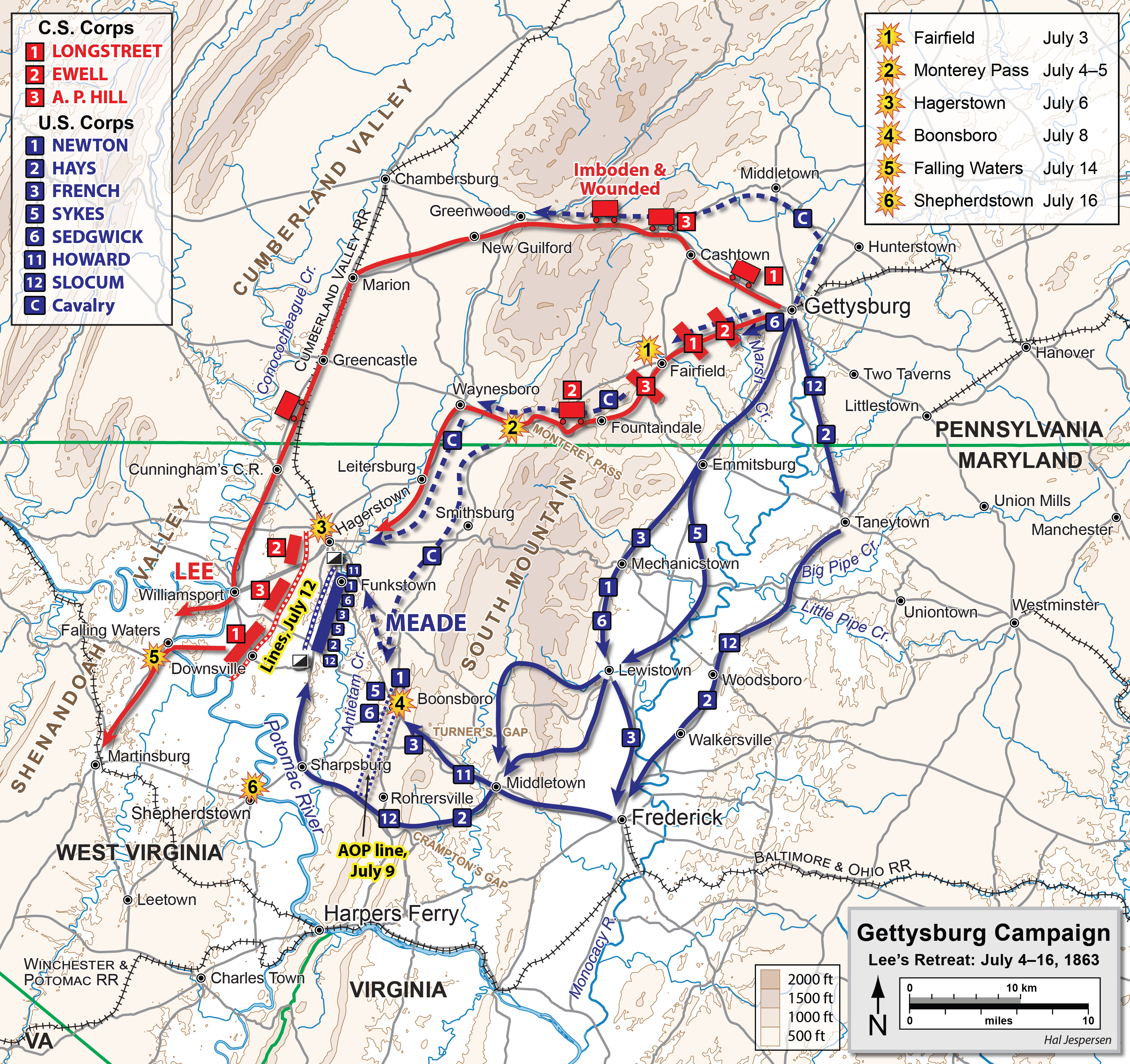
Gettysburg Campaign (July 5– July 14) Confederate Union

The Second Battle of Funkstown (more commonly simply referred to as the Battle of Funkstown) took place near Funkstown, Maryland, on July 10, 1863, during the Gettysburg campaign of the American Civil War. Union forces of the Army of the Potomac attacked the rear guard of the Confederate Army of Northern Virginia during its retreat from Pennsylvania following the Battle of Gettysburg.

A strong Confederate presence at Funkstown threatened any Union advance against Gen. Robert E. Lee’s position near Williamsport and the Potomac River as he retreated to Virginia after the Battle of Gettysburg. Maj. Gen. J.E.B. Stuart’s cavalry, posted at Funkstown, posed a serious risk to the Federal right and rear if the Union army lunged west from Boonsboro. Stuart, meanwhile, determined to wage a spirited defense to ensure Lee time to complete fortifications protecting his army and his avenue of retreat.

As Brig. Gen. John Buford’s Federal cavalry division cautiously approached Funkstown via the National Road on Friday morning July 10, 1863, it encountered Stuart's crescent-shaped, three-mile-long battle line. It was Stuart's first defensive battle since reentering Maryland. The high ground constituted Stuart's extreme right, held by Preston Chew's horse artillery. A nearby stone barn and barnyard wall proved a superb defensive position for the 34th Virginia Battalion's dismounted cavalry.

Col. Thomas C. Devin’s dismounted Union cavalry brigade attacked about 8:00 a.m. By mid-afternoon, with Buford's cavalrymen running low on ammunition and gaining little ground, Col. Lewis A. Grant’s First Vermont Brigade of infantry arrived and jabbed at the Confederate center less than one mile away. Unbeknownst to the Vermonters, Gen. George T. Anderson’s Confederate brigade now faced them, the first time opposing infantry had clashed since the Battle of Gettysburg.

By early evening, the Union Army began withdrawing south towards Beaver Creek, where the Union I, VI, and XI Corps had concentrated. Stuart had kept the Federals at bay for yet another day.

The day-long battle east of the road resulted in 479 casualties. The Chaney house served as a hospital. At the Keller home, Confederate Major Henry D. McDaniel, later the governor of Georgia, survived his wounds. He would spend the rest of the war in a Union prisoner-of-war camp.

A smaller engagement took place near Funkstown on July 7, three days prior to the Battle of Funkstown.
