= Embassy of the United States, Beirut =

American embassy in Lebanon

Embassy of the United States, Lebanon
- Location: Beirut, Lebanon
- Address: U.S. Embassy, Mazraat El Hdaira, Lebanon
- Coordinates: 33°56′6″N 35°35′53″E
- Jurisdiction: Lebanon
- Website: https://lb.usembassy.gov

The Embassy of the United States, Beirut is the diplomatic mission of the United States of America located in the capital city of Beirut, Lebanon. A new embassy complex under construction is anticipated to grow to be the second-largest in the world and occupy a 44 acres (18 ha) site.

== History ==
The United States formally recognized the sovereignty of Lebanon on September 8, 1944. Diplomatic relations were established when George Wadsworth II presented his credentials as Envoy Extraordinary and Minister Plenipotentiary on November 16, 1944. The diplomatic mission was elevated from a Legation to an Embassy on October 3, 1952, when Harold B. Minor was appointed as Ambassador Extraordinary and Plenipotentiary.

In April 1983, the embassy was the target of a suicide bombing perpetrated by Hezbollah with support from Iran which resulted in the death of 63 people including 17 Americans. Hezbollah, again with Iranian support, followed this with the 1984 US embassy bombing in Beirut which resulted in 23 deaths including two Americans.

As the Lebanese Civil War continued, due to increasing danger to personnel, the American Embassy was closed and all staff, including Ambassador John Thomas McCarthy, were evacuated on September 6, 1989. The closure occurred following the besieging of the embassy by supporters of a civil war faction, compromising its security and disrupting its operations. The Embassy was reopened on November 29, 1990, with Ryan Crocker presenting his credentials as the new Ambassador.

On 5 June 2024, it was reported that a shooting took place at the embassy.

== New building ==
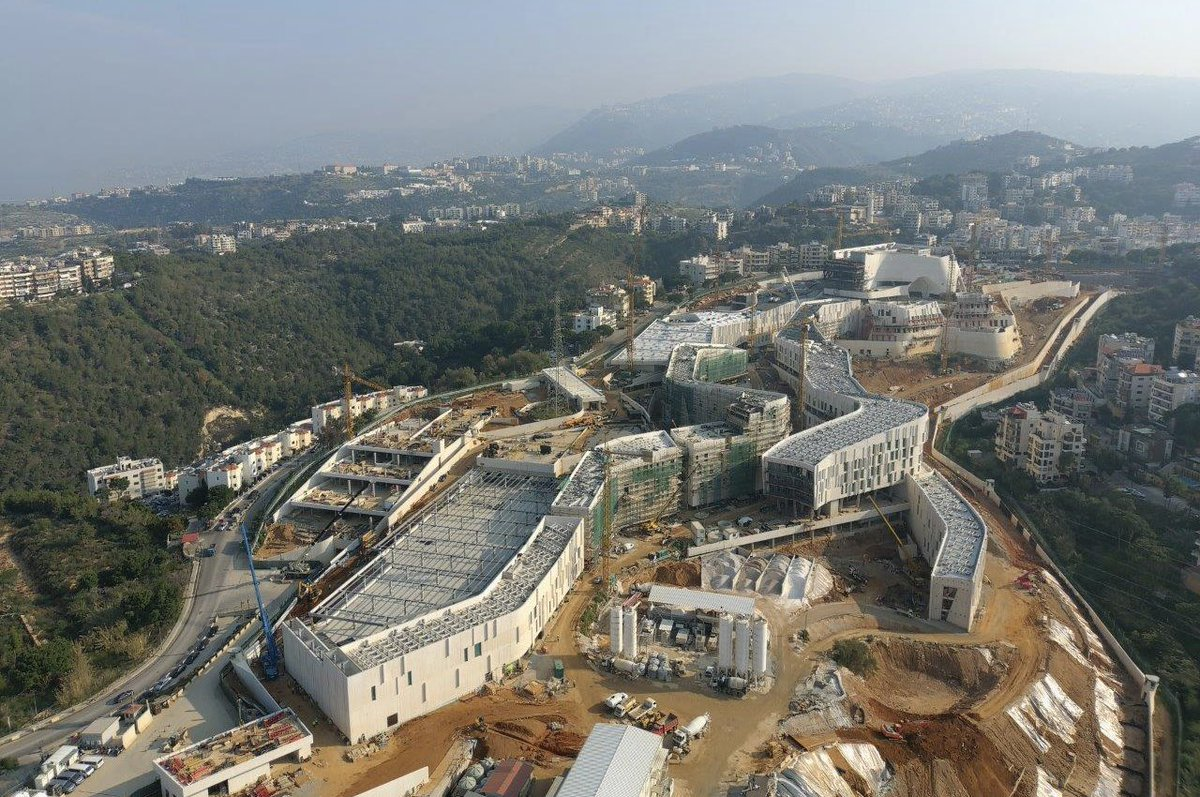
The new embassy complex under construction in 2023

In 2013, the designer of a new embassy complex in Beirut was announced as Morphosis Architects. Construction started in 2017 on a 43.87 acres (17.75 ha) site in Awkar, near the existing embassy, about 9 miles (14 km) northwest of central Beirut. The project budget was $1.03 billion with completion expected in 2022.

The new U.S. embassy complex has been the subject of a significant building project. The embassy is being constructed with multi-story buildings with tall glass windows, recreational spaces, and a swimming pool surrounded by vegetation and offering views of the Lebanese capital. The compound contains a chancery, staff housing, facilities for the community, and related support facilities.

The embassy complex is being built under the supervision of the Bureau of Overseas Building Operations (OBO). The construction of numerous additional US embassies across the world was overseen by the OBO. One of the biggest U.S. diplomatic buildings in the world, the new embassy complex is scheduled to be finished soon.

The new embassy complex is anticipated to grow to be the second-largest in the world, after the American embassy in Baghdad.

== Controversy ==
Particularly given that Lebanon is going through a financial crisis, the scale and price of the new U.S. embassy complex in Lebanon have generated debate and criticism. Some question why the U.S. needs such a sizable embassy in a nation with barely six million inhabitants. The complex will be surrounded by concrete walls and barbed-wire fences, leading to comparison with a military base.

== See also ==
- Embassy of Lebanon, Washington, D.C.
- Lebanon–United States relations
- List of ambassadors of the United States to Lebanon
- United States Ambassador to Lebanon
