= Lebanon–United States relations =

- Lebanon: United States

Diplomatic mission
- Embassy of Lebanon, Washington, D.C.: Embassy of the United States, Beirut

Lebanon–United States relations (Arabic: العلاقات الأمريكية اللبنانية) are the bilateral relations between Lebanon and the United States.

Formal relations between the two countries began in 1944, when US diplomat George Wadsworth presented his credentials as Envoy. Ties between Lebanon and the US have been historically close; the US has sent financial aid to Lebanon in multiple instances. Lebanese public opinion of the US is generally split, with around 40 to 45% of the population having a positive view. Opinion varies based on religion, with Lebanese Shias generally being more anti-American, and Lebanese Christians and Lebanese Sunnis more pro-American.

== History ==
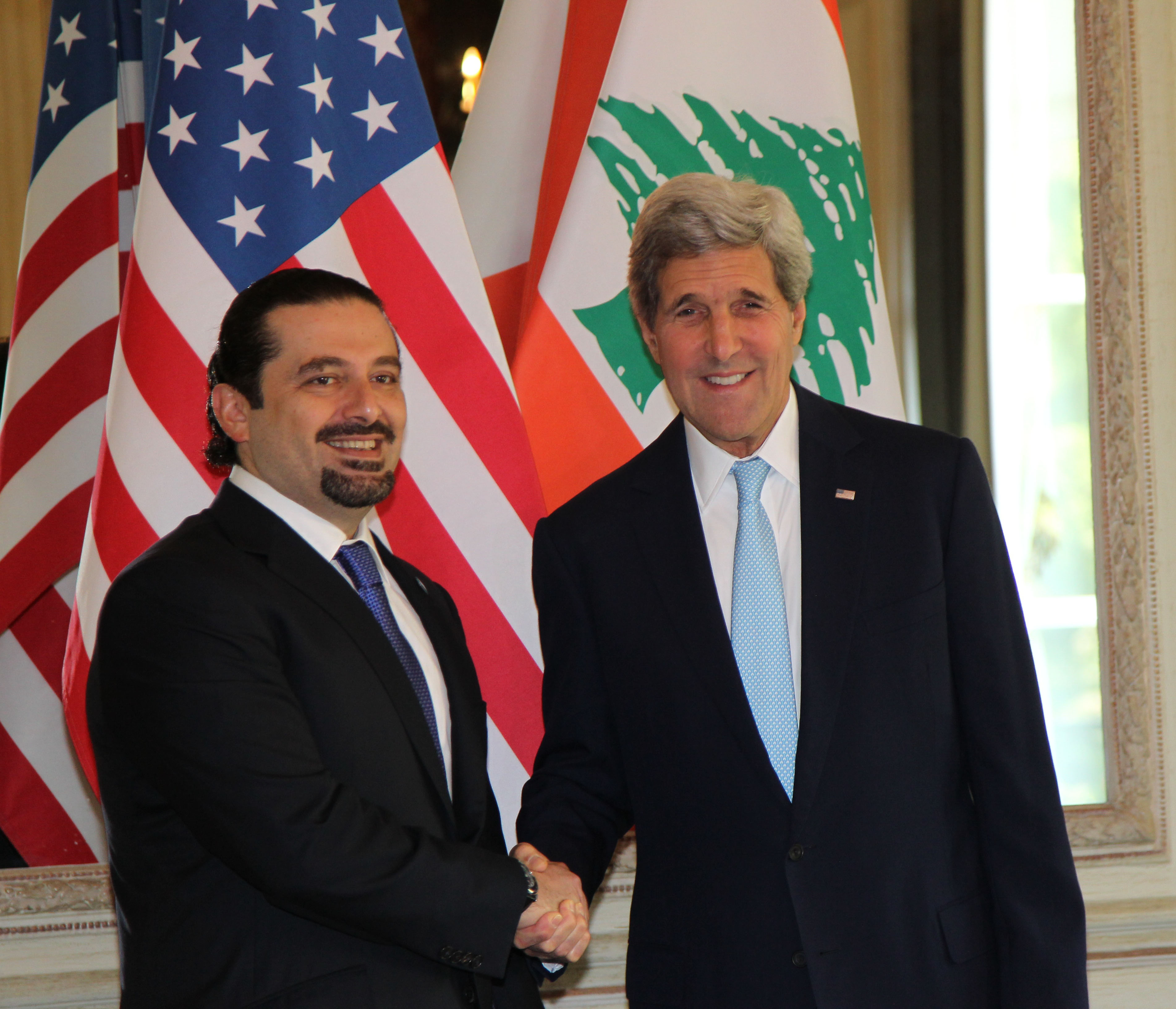
US Secretary of State John Kerry shakes hands with Lebanese Future Movement leader Saad Hariri in 2014

The United States sent diplomat George Wadsworth to Lebanon in October 1942 as an "Agent and Consul General" while Lebanon was still part of a French-ruled international mandate. The United States recognized Lebanon as an independent country on September 8, 1944. Formal relations were established on November 16, 1944, as Wadsworth presented his credentials as Envoy. The first ambassador of the United States was Harold B. Minor who was appointed to the post in October 1952.

The United States seeks to maintain its traditionally close ties with Lebanon, and to help preserve its independence, sovereignty, national unity, and territorial integrity. The United States, along with the international community, supports full implementation of UN Security Council Resolution 1559, including the disarming of all militias and the deployment of the Lebanese Armed Forces throughout Lebanon. The United States believes that a peaceful, prosperous, and stable Lebanon can make an important contribution to comprehensive peace in the Middle East.

One measure of U.S. concern and involvement has been a program of relief, rehabilitation, and recovery that from 1975 through 2005 totaled more than $400 million in aid to Lebanon. For relief, recovery, rebuilding, and security in the wake of the 2006 war, the U.S. government substantially stepped up this program, pledging well over $1 billion in additional assistance for the 2006 and 2007 fiscal years. This support reflects not only humanitarian concerns and historical ties but also the importance the United States attaches to sustainable development and the restoration of an independent, sovereign, unified Lebanon. Some of current funding is used to support the activities of U.S. and Lebanese private voluntary organizations engaged in rural and municipal development programs nationwide, improve the economic climate for global trade and investment, and enhance security and resettlement in south Lebanon. The U.S. also supports humanitarian demining and victims' assistance programs.

Over the years, the United States also has assisted the American University of Beirut (AUB) and the Lebanese American University (LAU) with budget support and student scholarships. Assistance also has been provided to the American Community School at Beirut (ACS) and the International College (IC).

In 1993, the U.S. resumed the International Military Education and Training program in Lebanon to help bolster the Lebanese Armed Forces (LAF)—the country's only nonsectarian national institution—and reinforce the importance of civilian control of the military. Sales of excess defense articles (EDA) resumed in 1991 and have allowed the LAF to enhance both its transportation and communications capabilities, which were severely degraded during the civil war. Security assistance to both the LAF and the Internal Security Forces (ISF) increased significantly after the 2006 war, in order to support the democratically elected Government of Lebanon as it carries out the requirements of UNSCR 1701 and asserts its sovereignty over the whole of Lebanese territory.

On October 24, 2012, five days after the deadly car bombing in Beirut that killed Lebanese chief of intelligence Wissam Al-Hassan, U.S. State Department spokeswoman Victoria Nuland announced that the American government will back the Lebanese political opposition coalition's call for a new cabinet free of Syrian influence as well as assist Lebanon in the investigation of the bombing.

In early November 2018, the United States Treasury Department put four key members of Lebanon's Hezbollah on the list of Specially Designated Global Terrorists program. They included Yusuf Hashim, Adnan Hussein Kawtharani, and Muhammad 'Abd-Al-Hadi Farhat and also Shibl Muhsin 'Ubayd Al-Zaydi who was a link between Hezbollah, Iran's Islamic Revolutionary Guard Corps and their supporters in Iraq.

In June 2019, the Trump administration imposed sanctions on three senior Hezbollah officials in Lebanon, Wafiq Safa, Muhammad Hasan Ra'd, and Amin Sherri. These officials were added to the U.S. Treasury Department's sanctions list and were accused of having a "malign agenda" to support the Iranian government.

In October 2023, unconfirmed information circulated that the U.S. would close its embassy in Beirut during the Gaza war. The information later turned out to be false, and the U.S. embassy in Beirut stated that the office "is open and operating normally". The news came after Israel reported that Hezbollah had possibly infiltrated Israel from southern Lebanon. The U.S. warned Hezbollah in Lebanon to not get involved in the fighting between Hamas and Israel.

In June 2024, the Lebanese army reported that a gunman attacked the U.S. embassy in Beirut. The assailant, described as a Syrian national, was shot by soldiers and subsequently taken to a hospital. According to local media reports, a gunfight ensued for nearly half an hour near the U.S. diplomatic mission in a northern suburb of Beirut.

On June 22, 2025, following Operation Midnight Hammer, sources reported that the U.S. State Department has ordered the departure of family members and non-emergency U.S. government personnel from Lebanon.

In April 2026, Michel Issa, American ambassador to Lebanon, informed Lebanese officials they will have to designate Hezbollah as a terrorist organization, both politically and militarily.

== Lebanese public opinion of the United States ==
According to polling by the Pew Research Center, from 2002 to 2017, on average 44% of Lebanese people expressed a positive opinion of the United States (lowest in 2003 at 27%, highest in 2009 at 55%), while on average 55% expressed a negative opinion (highest in 2003 at 71%, lowest in 2009 at 45%). Views of the United States are heavily slanted by religion in Lebanon, with Lebanese Christians and Sunnis being more pro-American and Lebanese Shias being more anti-American.

In 2005 (a year where 42% of Lebanese as a whole approved of the U.S.), "only 22% of Muslims had a favorable opinion of the U.S.—a level consistent with anti-American sentiments found throughout much of the Muslim world. However, nearly three-in-four Christians (72%) had a favorable view of the U.S."

According to 2022 polling, 55% of Lebanese Sunnis believed it was important to have good relations with the United States, compared to 43% of Lebanese Christians and 5% of Lebanese Shias. Conversely, when asked which country can best help protect Lebanon from foreign enemies, 51% of Lebanese Sunnis and 45% of Lebanese Christians chose the United States, in contrast to 4% of Lebanese Shias.

== See also ==
- 2023 American–Middle East conflict
- Foreign relations of the United States
- Foreign relations of Lebanon
- 1958 Lebanon crisis § Operation Blue Bat
- Lebanese Americans
