= 2024 attack on the United States embassy in Beirut =

Shooting in Beirut, Lebanon

2024 Beirut US embassy shooting
- Location: 33°56′6″N 35°35′53″E; Beirut, Lebanon
- Date: 5 June 2024
- Attack type: Mass shooting
- Weapon: Type 56 assault rifle
- Deaths: 0
- Injuries: 2 (including the perpetrator)
- Perpetrator: Islamic State Islamic State – Syria Province

On 5 June 2024, at 8:34 am, a shooting took place at the US embassy in Beirut, Lebanon. An armed assailant opened fire on the embassy located in the Awkar area in Beirut, lightly injuring a security guard. The attacker was wounded and detained by the Lebanese Armed Forces.

== Shooting ==
According to reports, a lone gunman, identified as a Syrian national, attempted to carry out an attack on the US embassy. The gunman, who wore a military-style black vest and helmet, was armed with an assault rifle. He opened fire at a military vehicle approaching the embassy, leading to a shootout. The embassy reported small arms fire near its entrance at around 8:34 am. According to an eyewitness, 15 to 20 gunshots were fired during the attack.

The Lebanese military intervened promptly, engaging the attacker in a gunfight that lasted for approximately thirty minutes. The military later released a statement confirming that soldiers had shot and captured the assailant. A member of the embassy's security team sustained injuries. The suspect was shot on the stomach and leg, and was later treated at a military hospital in Beirut.

In response to the attack, the US embassy issued a statement affirming that none of its staff members were harmed during the assault. The embassy's security personnel, in collaboration with Lebanese troops, mobilized to ensure the safety and security of the premises.

Following the attempted attack, the Lebanese military implemented heightened security measures in the vicinity of the embassy and surrounding areas. Additional troops were deployed to reinforce security protocols and prevent any further security breaches.

== Investigation ==
Lebanese media reported that the attacker wore a vest with the words "Islamic State" in Arabic alongside the initials "IS", however the organization did not claim responsibility for the attack. According to Reuters, the Arabic writing on the vest read "Islamic". An investigation was launched by Lebanese authorities and the US State Department's Diplomatic Security Service to determine the motives and to assess any potential security vulnerabilities. A Lebanese judicial official said that the attacker admitted to carrying out the attack in support of Gaza in the Gaza war. LBCI confirmed that the individual responsible for the attack acted independently and was not part of any organized cell. On 2 July 2024, a military court charged the gunman with being affiliated with the Islamic State. Two people who sold firearms to the gunman were charged with illicitly selling unlicensed weapons.

Islamic State – Syria Province did not officially claim responsibility for the armed attack near the U.S. Embassy in Lebanon.

The Lebanese army raided Majdal Anjar and Suweiri and arrested five people, including three of the gunman's relatives and a citizen suspected of having a relationship with him. The number of arrests rose to 20 by 8 June.

== Reaction ==
The Ministry of Foreign Affairs of the United Arab Emirates issued a statement condemning the attack on the embassy. Qatar's foreign ministry and GCC Secretary-General, Jassim Mohammed Al-Badawi, condemned the attack as well.

== See also ==
- Attacks on the United States
- 1983 US embassy bombing in Beirut
- 1984 US embassy bombing in Beirut
- 1983 Beirut barracks bombings
