= Attacks on the United States =

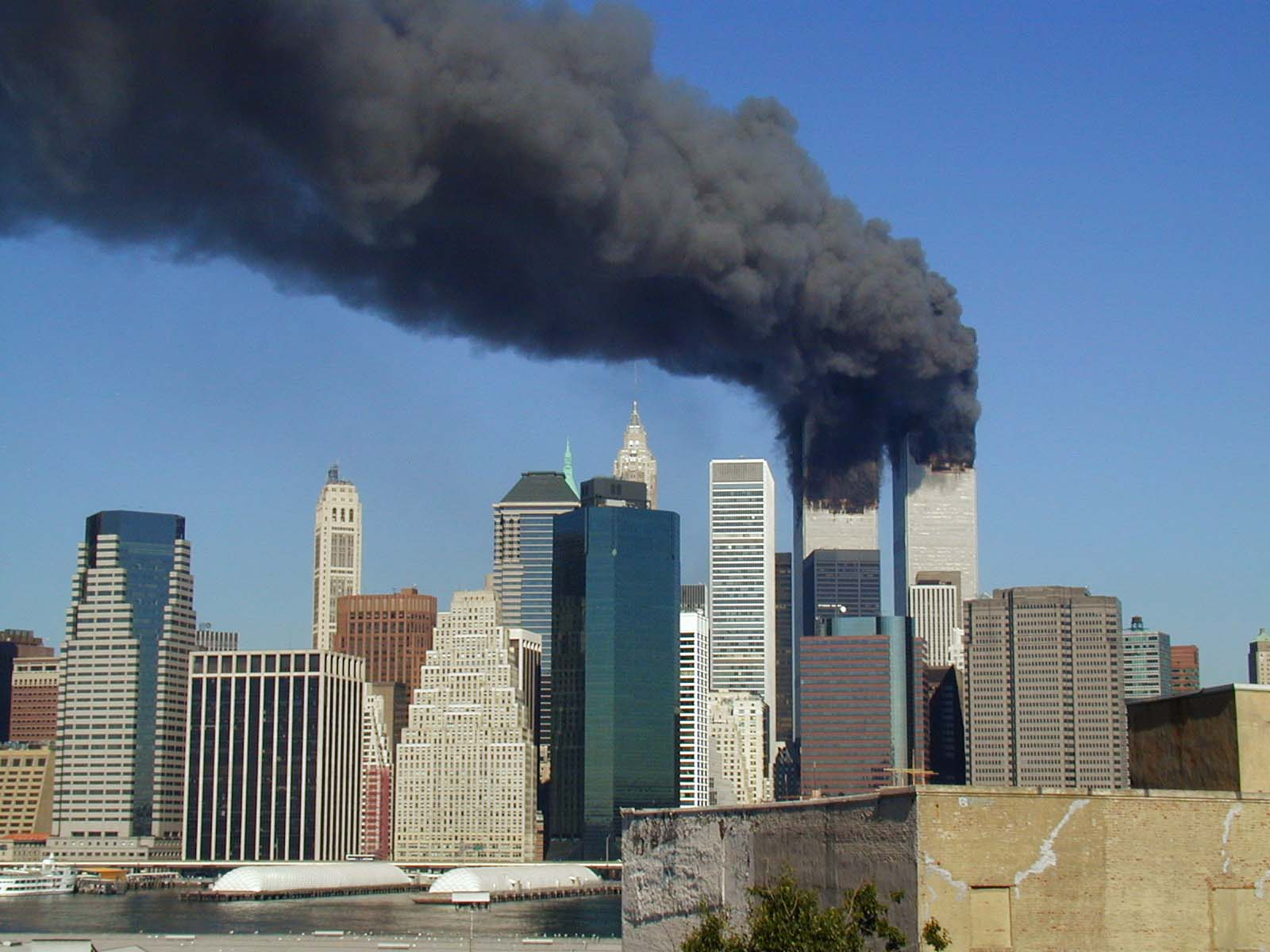
The Twin Towers burning after the September 11 attacks, the deadliest terrorist attack in history

The United States has been attacked numerous times throughout its history, including attacks on its states and territories, embassies and consulates, and its military. Attacks against the United States include invasions, military offensives, raids, bombardment and airstrikes on its military, non-domestic terrorist attacks, destruction of infrastructure, and any other deliberate act of violence against the United States government or military.

Territory controlled by the United States was invaded by British forces during the American Revolutionary War and War of 1812 and by Mexican forces during the Mexican–American War. During the American Civil War, the Confederate States of America, an unrecognized de facto breakaway country from the United States, launched numerous attacks and invasions of the United States, commonly referred to for the war as the "Union". Between 1900 and 1945 the United States was attacked numerous times during World War I and World War II, six times along the Mexico–United States border from various conflicts in Mexico, and once each in Nicaragua and in Iran.

Following the conclusion of World War II, the United States engaged in a rivalry with the Soviet Union during the Cold War, between 1947 and 1991. During this time, several proxy wars occurred, with the United States and Soviet Union sponsoring wars against each other. These proxy wars, such as the Vietnam War and the Lebanese Civil War, often led to attacks against American embassies and consulates as well as American troops in the proxy war regions. In the 21st century, al-Qaeda conducted the September 11 attacks, which began the US-led Global War on Terror, particularly in the Middle East. During the war on terror, numerous attacks occurred against American embassies and consulates as well as American troops. During the Middle Eastern Crisis, which began in October 2023, over 170 attacks occurred against the United States across the entire Middle East.

The most recent attack against the United States was by Iran on July 17, 2026, amid the 2026 Iran war’s Iranian strikes on Jordan. Two Iranian ballistic missiles struck the Muwaffaq Salti Air Base in Jordan, killing two American service members, injuring more than four others, and left one missing. The missiles targeted troop housing on the base, and caused a fire large enough to be detected by NASA’s FIRMS fire detection satellites. On July 18, an American service member was killed during a "controlled detonation" of unexploded ordnance from a downed Iranian drone after being struck by shrapnel.

== 1776–1899 ==
=== American Revolutionary War (July 1776 – September 1783) ===
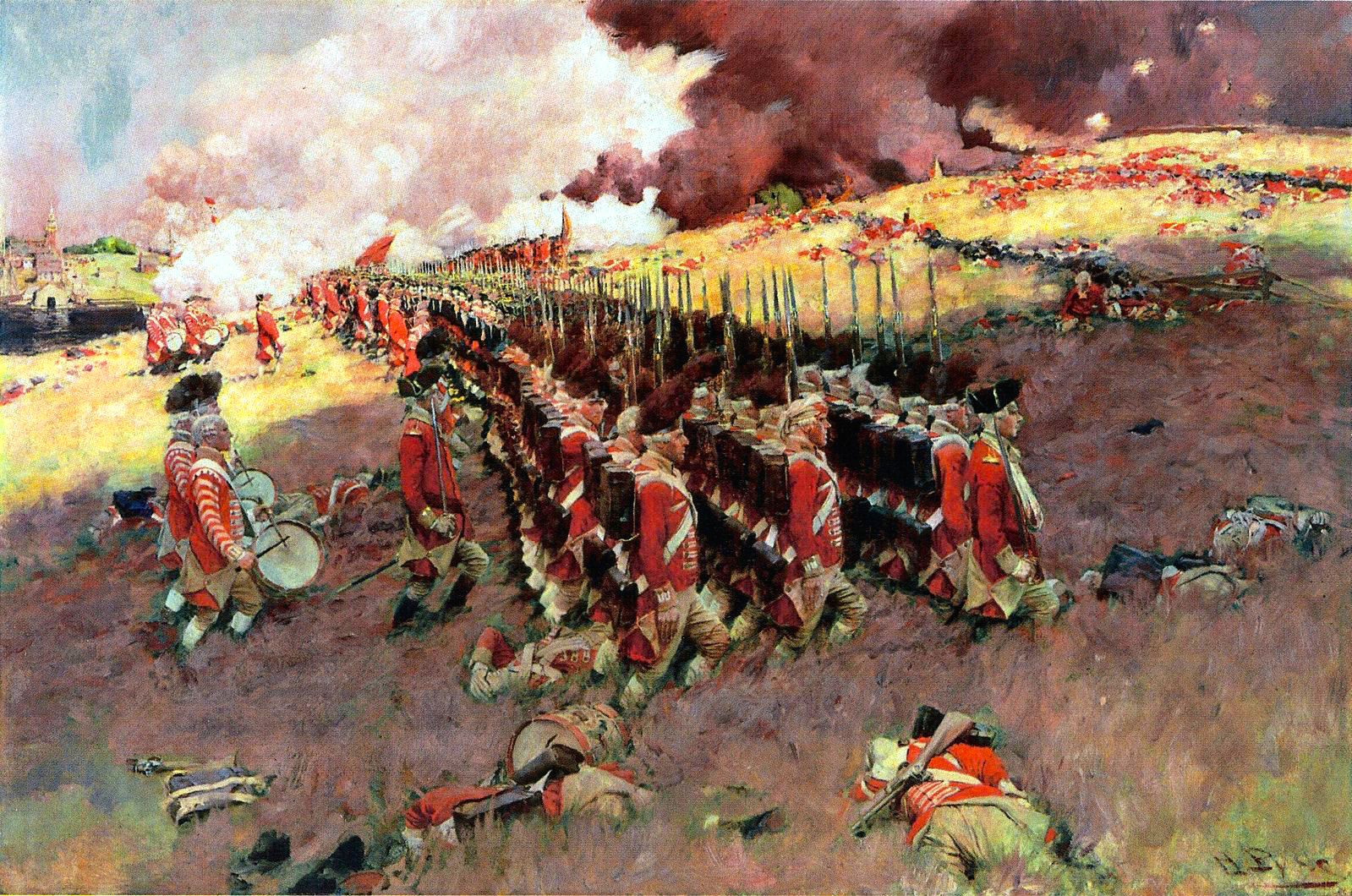
The Battle of Bunker Hill by Howard Pyle in 1897

Following the ratification of the Declaration of Independence on July 4, 1776, which formally formed the United States, Patriot forces organized as the Continental Army and, commanded by George Washington, fought against British forces and secured American independence from Britain. Following the Treaty of Paris in 1783, which formally ended the war, Great Britain ceded all mainland territories east of the Mississippi River, south of the Great Lakes, and north of the Floridas to the United States and recognized the independence of the United States. Until the end of the war, the United States had no internationally recognized territory (besides France after the 1777 Battle of Saratoga), and was considered part of the First British Empire.

=== Northwest Indian War ===
==== Battle of the Wabash ====
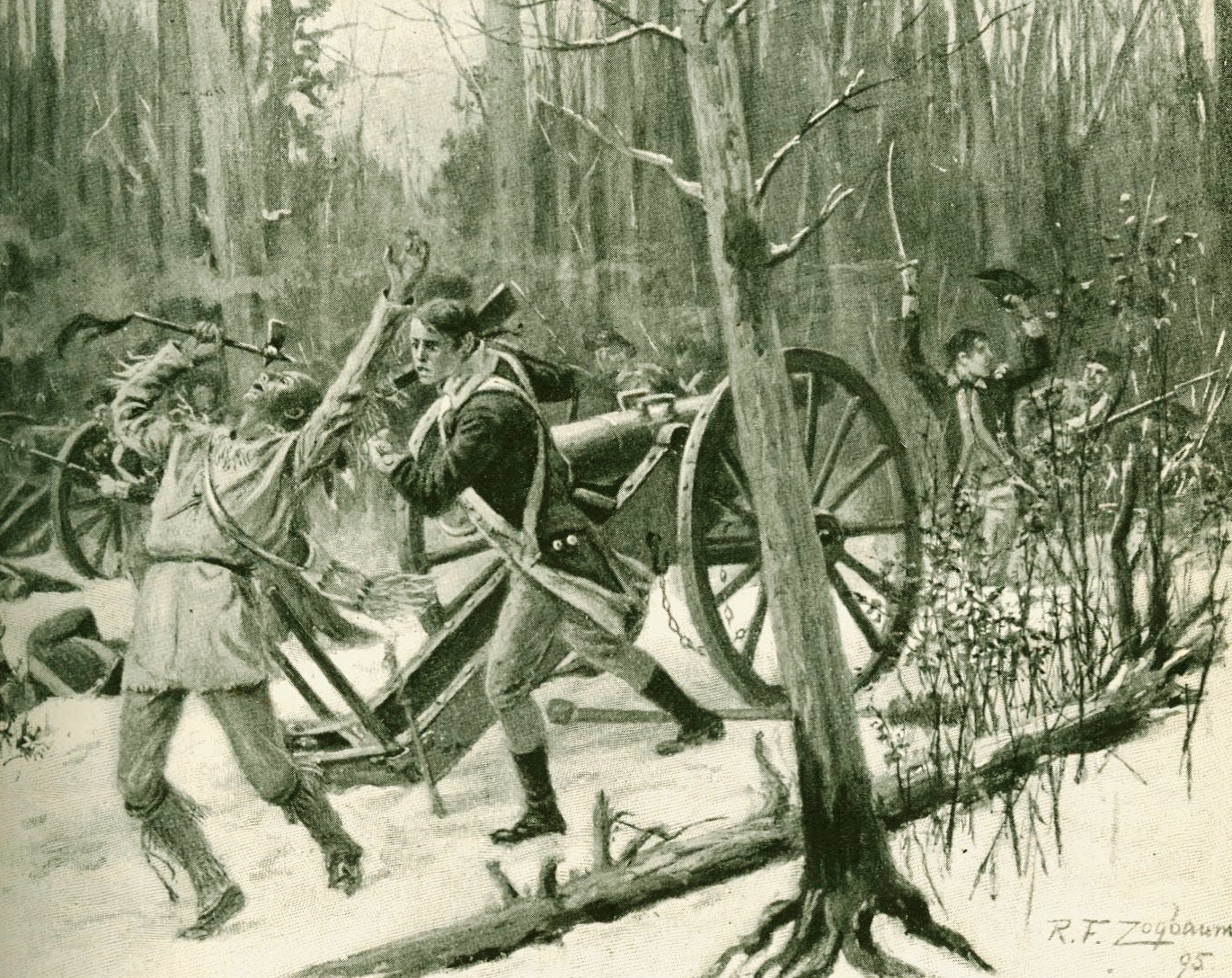
1895 illustration of the battle by Rufus Fairchild Zogbaum

==== Little Turtles' attack on Fort St. Clair ====
In November 1792, following the decision of a Native American Grand Council at the mouth of the Auglaize River, Little Turtle led a force of 200 Miami and Shawnee past United States outposts of Fort Jefferson and Fort St. Clair, and reached Fort Hamilton on 3 November with the intention of an attack near the United States settlements on the anniversary of St. Clair's Defeat. They captured two prisoners and learned that a large convoy of packhorses had left for Fort Jefferson and was due back in a matter of days. Little Turtle moved North and found the convoy, nearly 100 horses and 100 members of the Kentucky Militia (the predecessor to the Kentucky National Guard), led by Major John Adair, camped just outside Fort St. Clair. On November 6, Little Turtle attacked at dawn, just as Major Adair recalled his sentries. The Militia conducted an organized retreat to the fort, with six killed (considered the first Kentucky Guardsman killed in action), four missing, and five wounded. Major Adair later criticized Fort St. Clair's commandant, Captain Bradley, for his failure to come to their aid. Little Turtle's force lost two warriors, but captured the camp and all provisions. All horses were killed, wounded, or driven off; only 23 were later recovered. Wilkinson considered the horses to be a loss that would make the advanced forts un-defendable.

=== Quasi-War (July 1798 – September 1800) ===
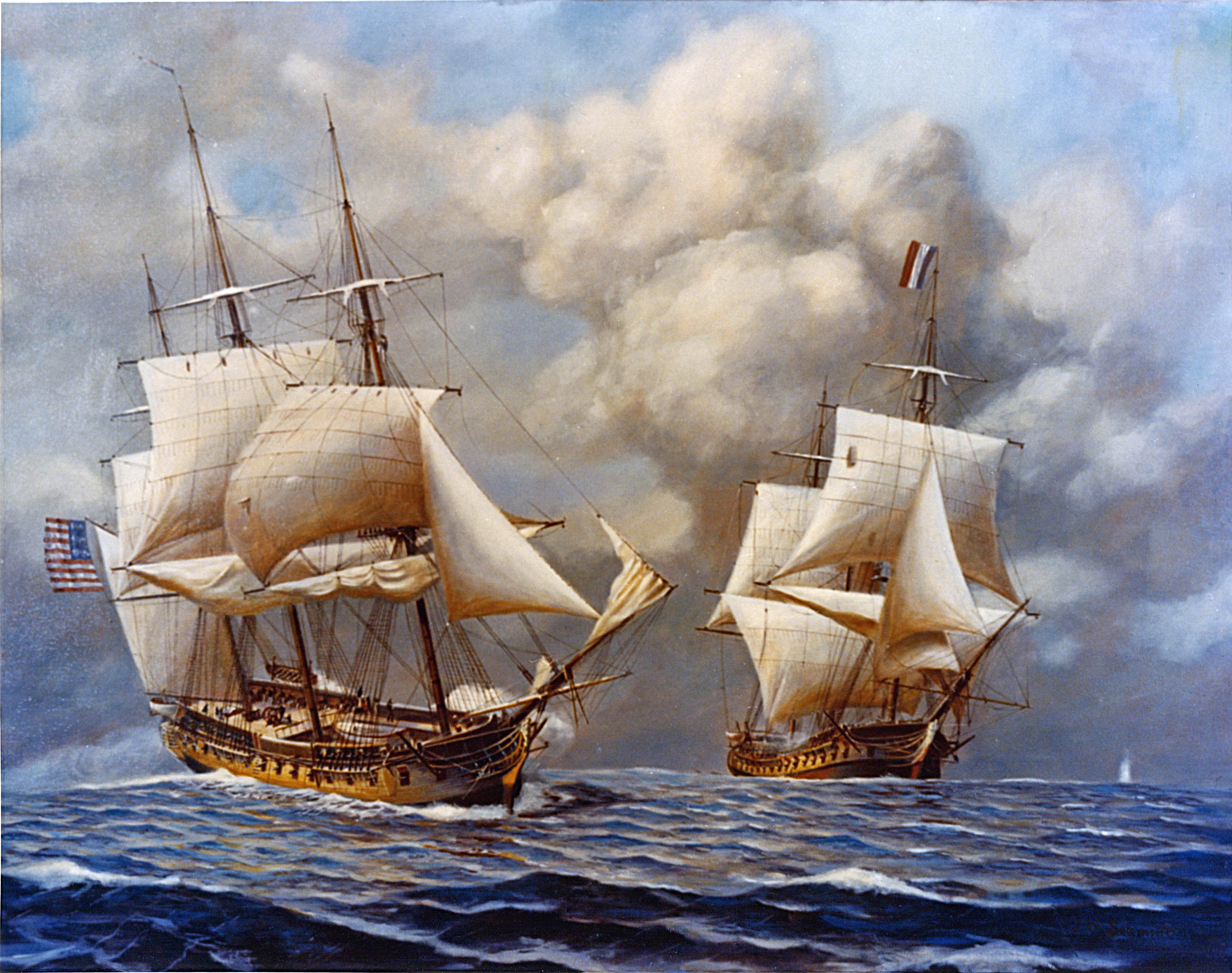
The USS Constellation in combat with French Insurgente

The Quasi-War was an undeclared naval conflict between the United States and France, arising from French resentment of the Jay Treaty between Great Britain and the United States, during the French Revolutionary Wars. French privateers and naval vessels targeted American shipping in the Caribbean and Atlantic, capturing hundreds of merchant vessels and disrupting trade. On February 9, 1799, the French frigate L'Insurgente fought against the American frigate USS Constellation. The Convention of 1800 ended the undeclared war between France and the United States.

=== War of 1812 (June 1812–1815) ===
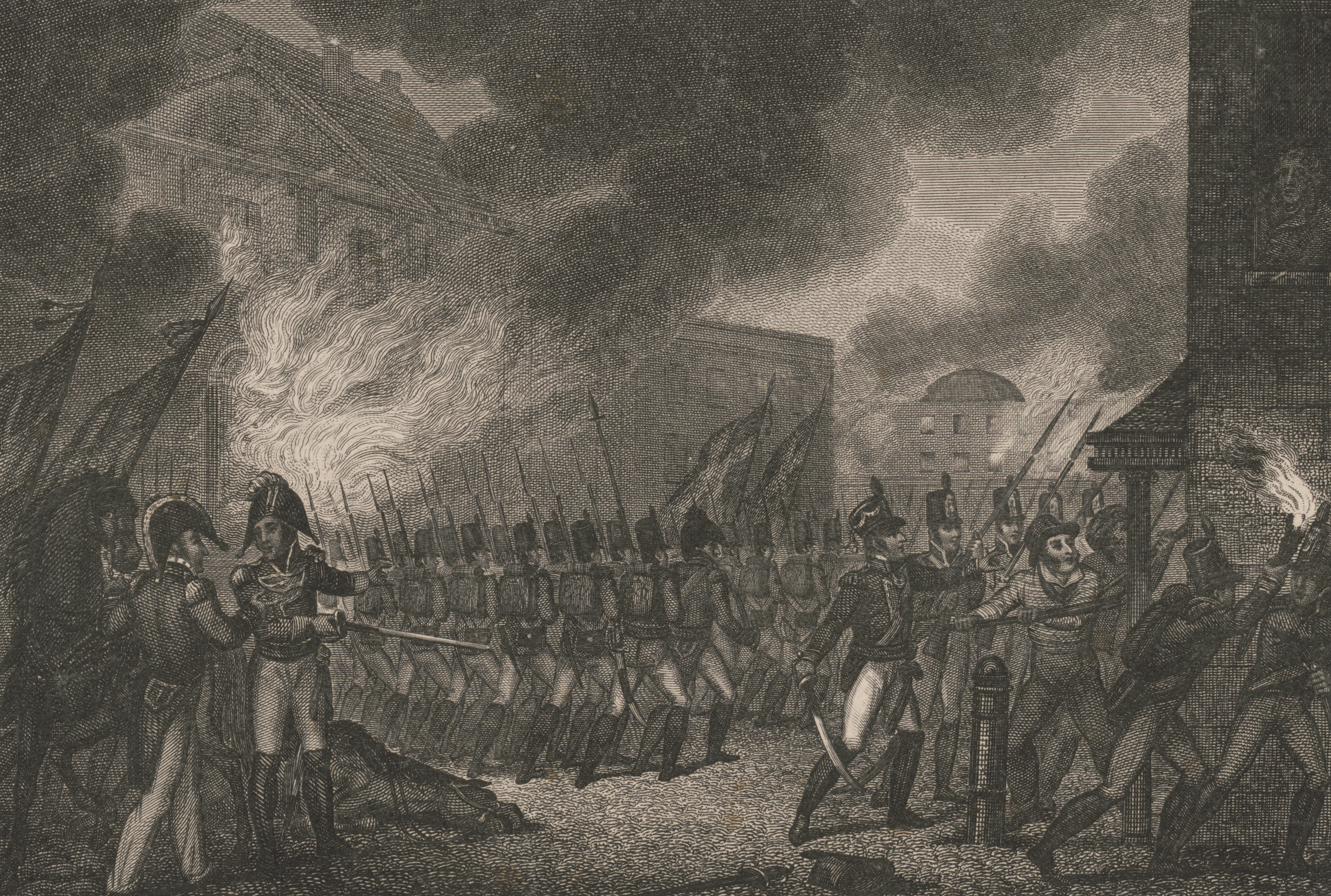
1815 illustration of the Burning of Washington on August 24, 1814

The Chesapeake campaign during the War of 1812 was a military naval and land invasion by British forces along the East Coast of the United States. In April 1813, British forces launched raids on the Rappahannock River, capturing four American privateer schooners. A month later, in May, they attacked Havre de Grace, burning much of the town after routing its defenders. The campaign saw a key defensive victory for the Americans at the battle of Craney Island in June 1813, where American forces repelled a British assault aimed at capturing Norfolk, Virginia and its naval yard. Two days later, the British captured and briefly occupied Hampton, Virginia after routing 400 defending Virginia militia. In July 1813, British forces disrupted American shipping off the coast of North Carolina by capturing the town of Ocracoke and nearby Portsmouth.

In August 1814, the British launched a fresh campaign aimed at capturing Washington. After routing American forces at the Battle of Bladensburg, where unprepared militia scattered under fire, the British marched into Washington and carried out the burning of Washington, torching the Capitol, White House, and other federal buildings in retaliation for American atrocities during their invasions of Canada. They then turned their attention to Baltimore, but were checked at the Battle of Baltimore, particularly at Fort McHenry, where American defenders withstood a hours-long bombardment and where Francis Scott Key wrote "The Star-Spangled Banner". The campaign culminated in the raid of Alexandria, which was occupied by the British for three days.

=== Mexican–American War (April 1846 – June 1848) ===
==== Texas Campaign ====
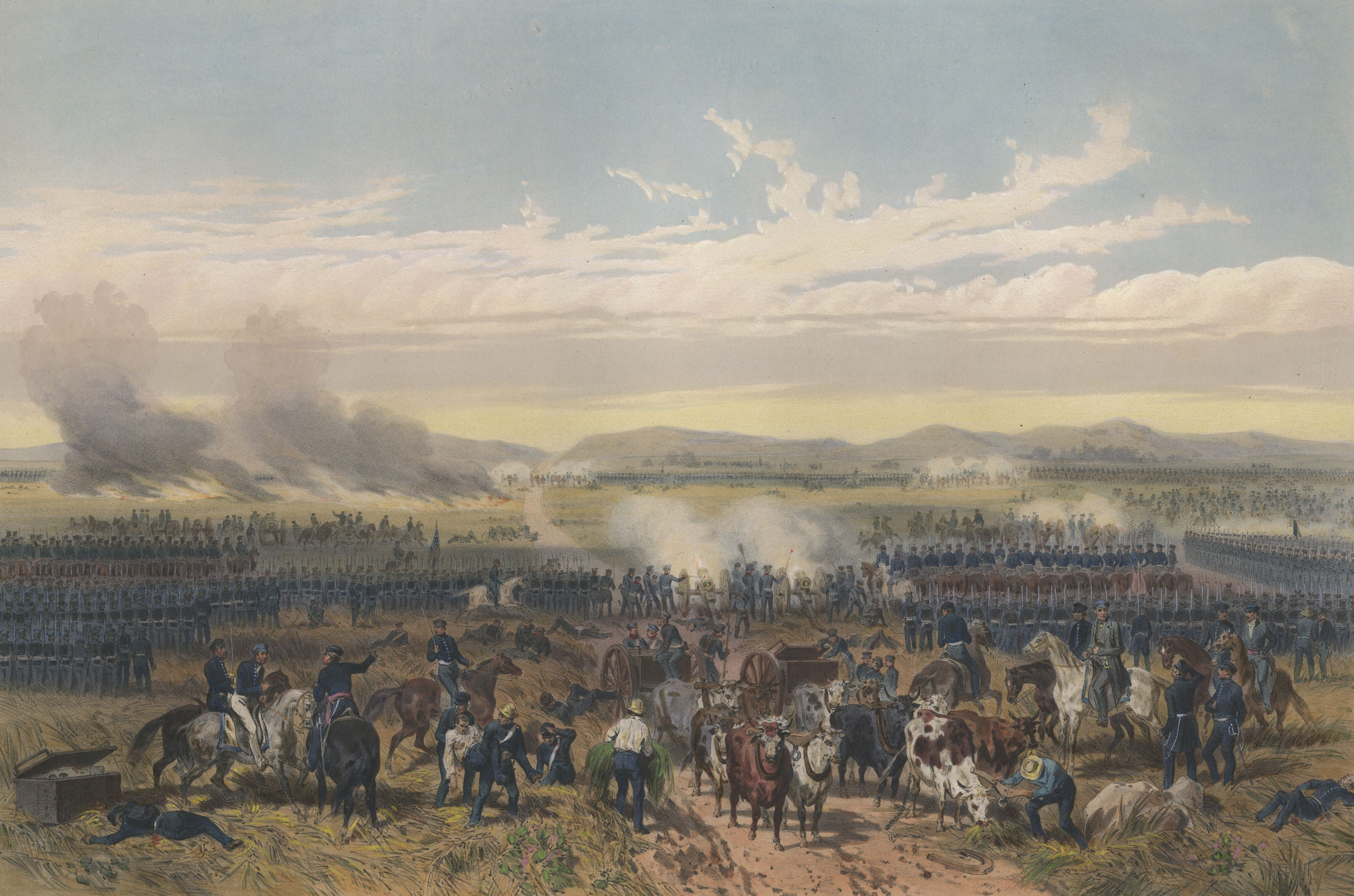
The Battle of Palo Alto during the Texas Campaign

Following the United States' annexation of Texas in 1845, the Mexican government claimed they still owned the portion of Texas between the Nueces River and the Rio Grande. On April 25, 1846, approximately 1,600 Mexican soldiers, under the command of General Mariano Arista, crossed the border into the United States and began an invasion, with the goal to hold and occupy the territory claimed by Mexico. American Captain Seth B. Thornton was sent to investigate a report of Mexican soldiers crossing the border, which led him and his 80 men into an ambush. With the Mexican forces still occupying part of Texas, American General Zachary Taylor took the Army of Occupation to fight the now reinforced Mexican Army of The North. Between May 3–9, the Mexican forces attempted to siege to the American "Fort Texas". Following the Mexican defeats during the Battle of Palo Alto on May 8 and the battle of Resaca de la Palma on May 9, the Mexican forces withdrew from American territory, ending the brief invasion. In total, 60 Americans died during the Texas Campaign.

==== United States occupation of Mexico City ====
Following the fall of Mexico City in September 1847, the United States began a military occupation of the city and surrounding area. During the eight-month occupation under John A. Quitman, the named Military Governor of Mexico City, several attacks by Mexican resistance took place against the occupation forces, especially in the first three days which involved "intense and bloody street fighting". In total, 4,356 Americans died as a result of the occupation of Mexico City.

=== American Civil War (October 1859 – May 1865) ===
Following the secession of South Carolina, Mississippi, Florida, Alabama, Georgia, Louisiana, and Texas, the Confederate States of America was formed on February 8, 1861. The Confederate States of America was an unrecognized de facto breakaway country from the United States, primarily due to no European power desiring to get involved in the conflict.

==== John Brown's raid on Harpers Ferry ====
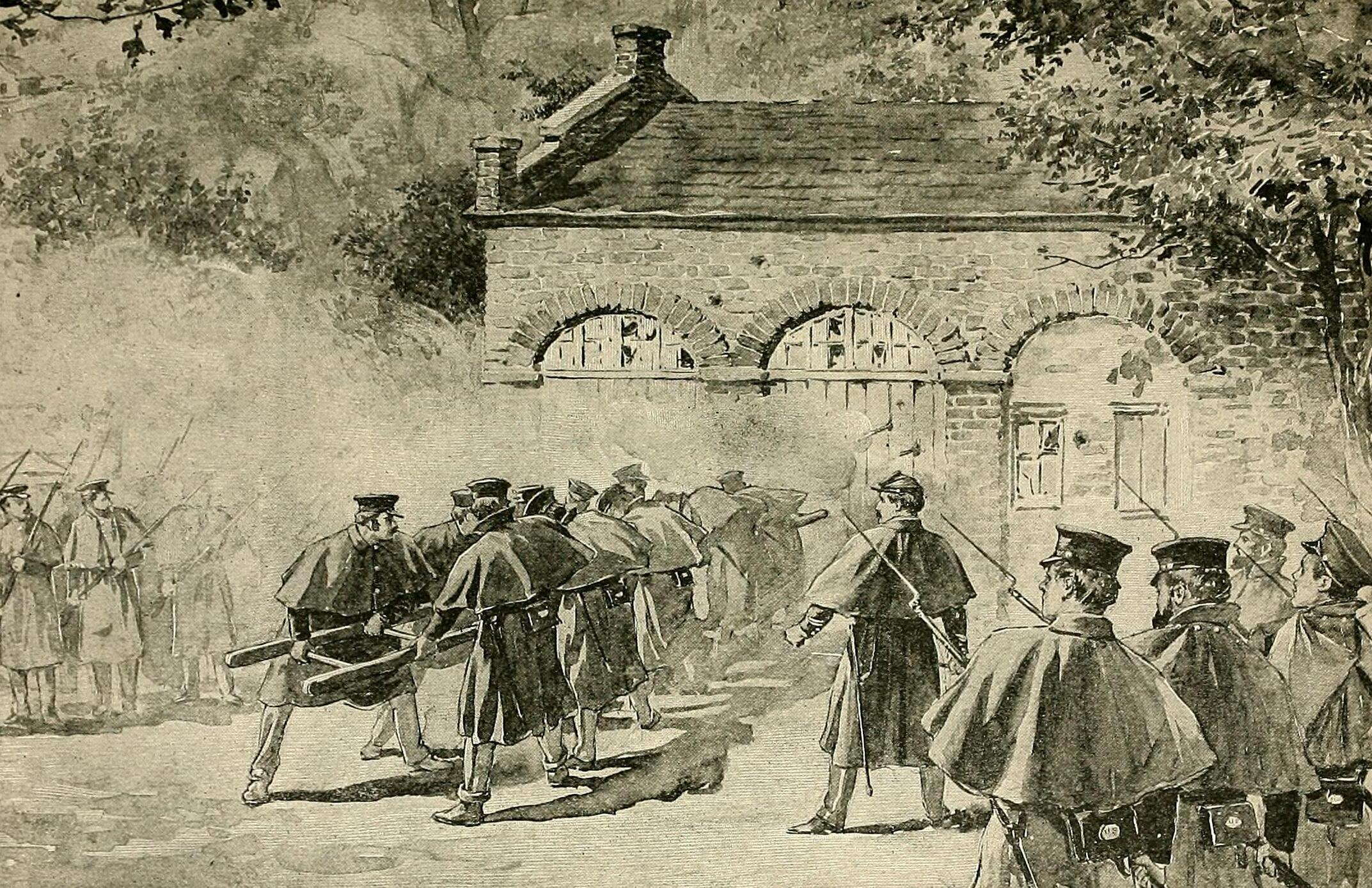
1897 illustration of U.S. Marines attacking "John Brown's Fort"

John Brown, a radical abolitionist, sought to ignite a slave uprising by seizing the federal armory and arsenal at Harpers Ferry, Virginia (now West Virginia). With a small force of 21 men, including five African Americans, Brown aimed to distribute the captured weapons to enslaved people in the region, sparking a broader rebellion against slavery. On the night of October 16, 1859, Brown and his men easily captured the United States Armory and Arsenal at Harpers Ferry and briefly held hostages, including prominent local citizens. However, the town's residents and local militia quickly mobilized, surrounding the raiders and cutting off their escape. The situation escalated when a company of U.S. Marines, under the command of then-Colonel Robert E. Lee, stormed the armory on October 18, killing most of Brown's men and capturing him alive. The raid failed to achieve its immediate objectives, as no large-scale slave rebellion materialized and Brown was later executed for treason.

==== Battle of Fort Sumter ====
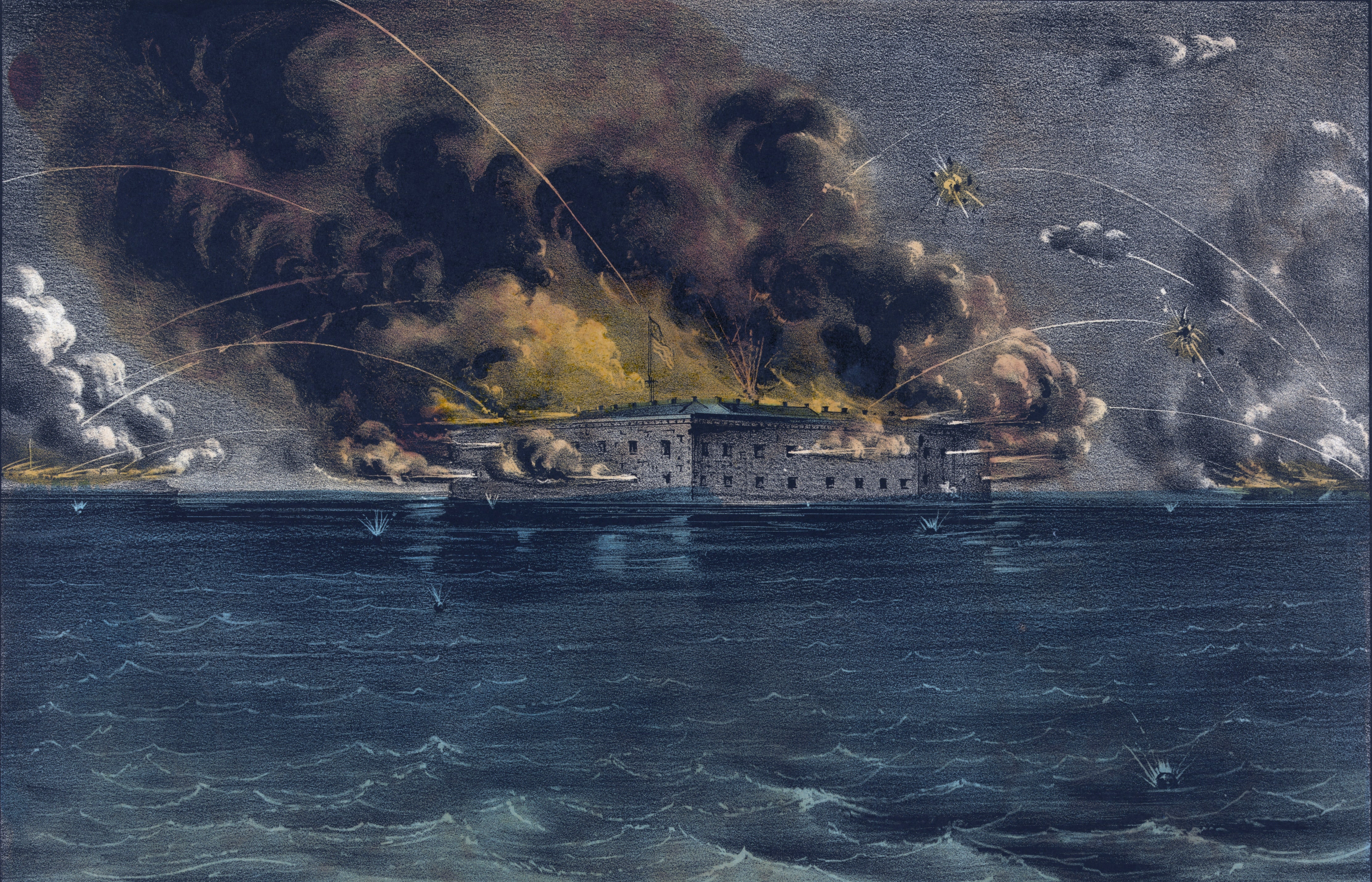
Bombardment of Fort Sumter, a portrait by Currier and Ives

On the morning of April 12, Confederate forces under General P. G. T. Beauregard opened fire on the United States' Fort Sumter, South Carolina, after the Union commanding officer Major Robert Anderson refused to surrender. For 34 hours, Confederate artillery bombarded the fort, while Union forces, outgunned and outmatched, offered only limited resistance. On April 13, with supplies dwindling and the fort heavily damaged, Anderson agreed to surrender. Remarkably, there were no fatalities during the bombardment, though one Union soldier was killed during a ceremonial cannon salute after the surrender. The Battle of Fort Sumter is regarding as the formal start of the American Civil War.

==== New Mexico campaign ====
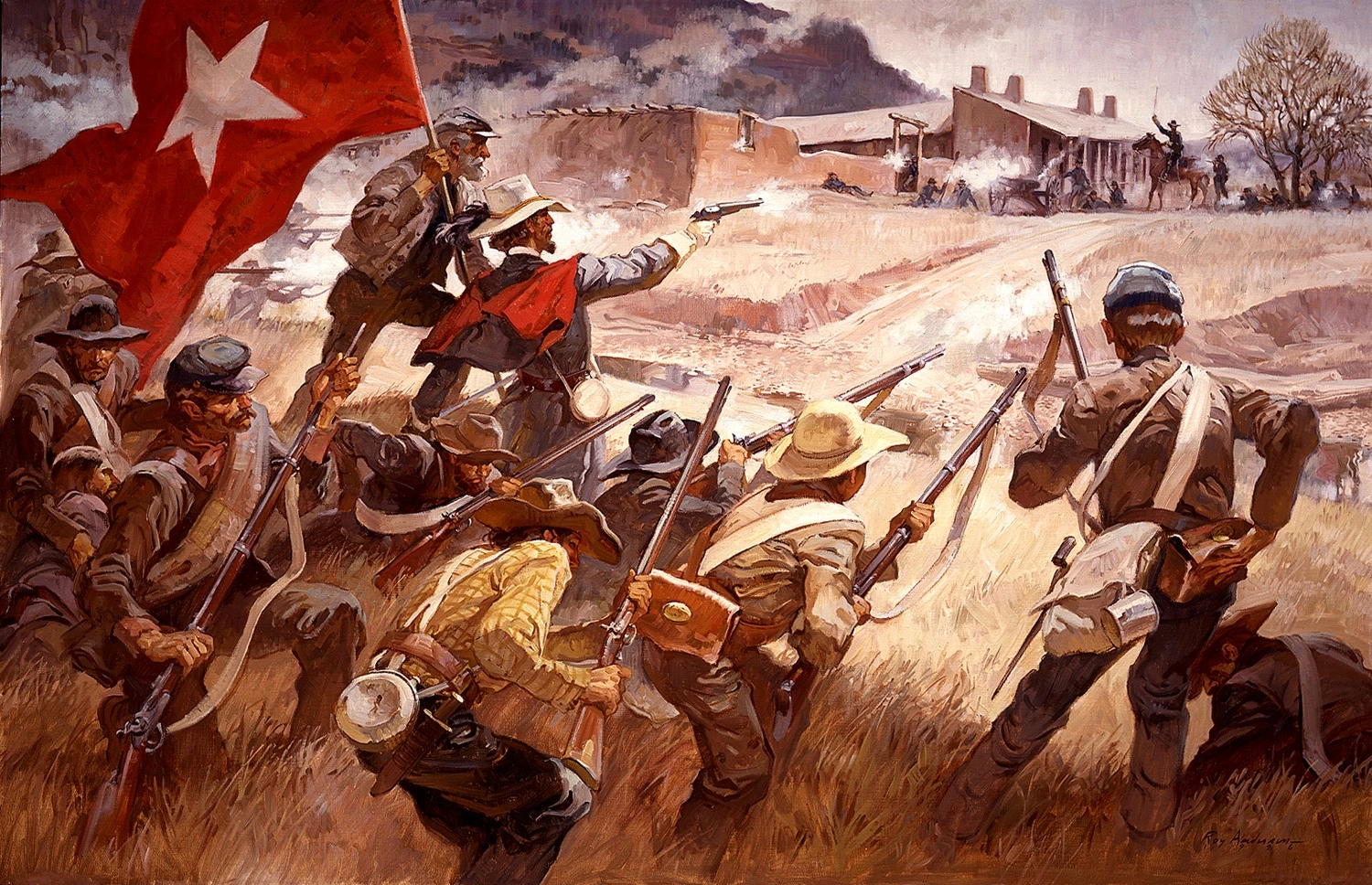
Depiction of the Battle of Glorieta Pass during the campaign, dubbed the "Gettysburg of the West"

In February 1862, Confederate forces under General Henry Hopkins Sibley invaded the New Mexico Territory, aiming to capture key areas and push into Colorado and California. The campaign began with the battle of Valverde on February 21, where Confederate troops defeated Union forces near Fort Craig but failed to capture the fort, leaving a Union stronghold in their rear. Sibley's forces continued north, seizing Albuquerque and Santa Fe with little resistance. The turning point came at the Battle of Glorieta Pass between March 26–28, where Union troops destroyed the Confederate supply train in a flanking attack, crippling Sibley's campaign. Forced to retreat, the Confederates faced further harassment during the skirmishes at Albuquerque on April 8 and at Peralta on April 15. These setbacks, combined with severe logistical challenges, forced the Confederates to abandon their ambitions in the Southwest. The campaign's failure secured Union control of the New Mexico Territory and Confederate Arizona for the remainder of the Civil War and marked the end of Confederate expansion westward.

==== Jackson's Valley campaign ====
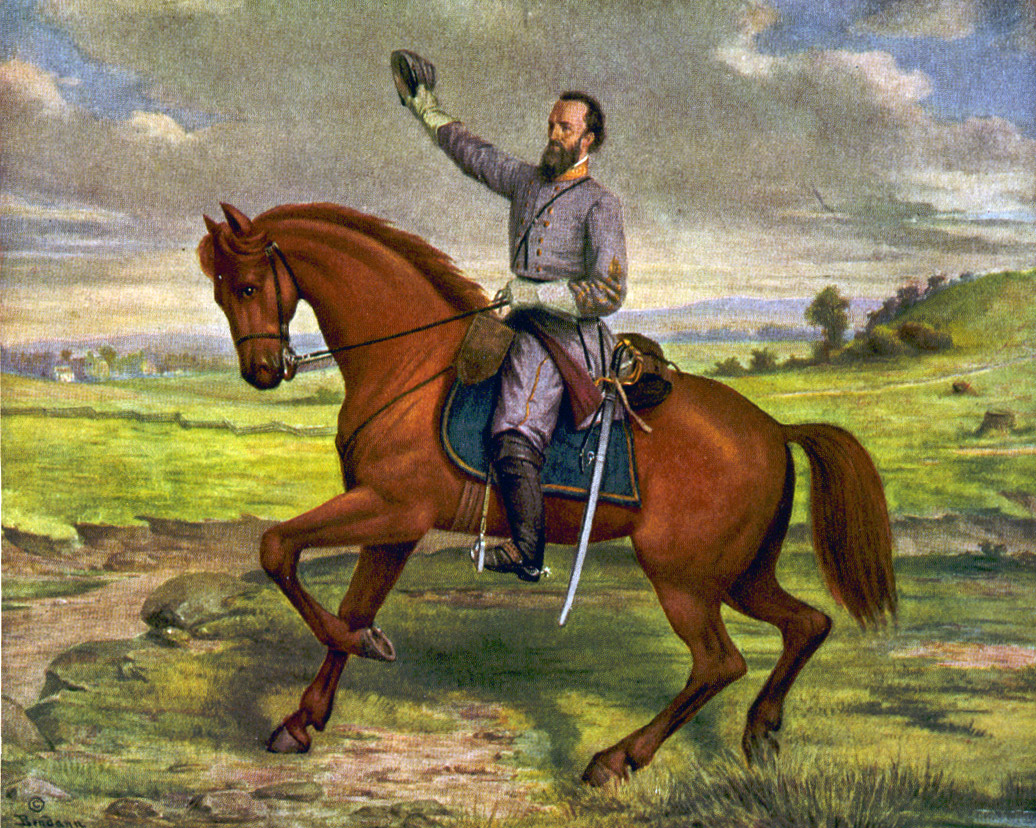
Maj. Gen. Thomas J. "Stonewall" Jackson, commander of the Confederate forces in the Shenandoah Valley campaign of 1862

The Confederate operation in the Shenandoah Valley between March–June 1862 was led by General Thomas "Stonewall" Jackson. The campaign began with the First Battle of Kernstown on March 23, where Jackson suffered a tactical defeat but succeeded in alarming Union leaders, prompting them to reinforce their forces in the region. In May, Jackson struck back at the Battle of McDowell on May 8, defeating Union General Robert H. Milroy and securing the western approaches to the Valley. Jackson's rapid movements continued with the Battle of Front Royal on May 23, where his forces overwhelmed a smaller Union garrison, forcing General Nathaniel P. Banks to retreat to Winchester, Virginia. At the First Battle of Winchester on May 25, Jackson routed Banks, capturing supplies and driving Union forces out of the Valley. In June, Union generals John C. Frémont and Erastus B. Tyler attempted to trap Jackson, but he skillfully divided his forces, defeating Fremont at the Battle of Cross Keys on June 8 and Tyler at the Battle of Port Republic on June 9. These victories secured Confederate control of the Shenandoah Valley and forced Union commanders to withdraw their forces.

==== Seven Days Battles ====
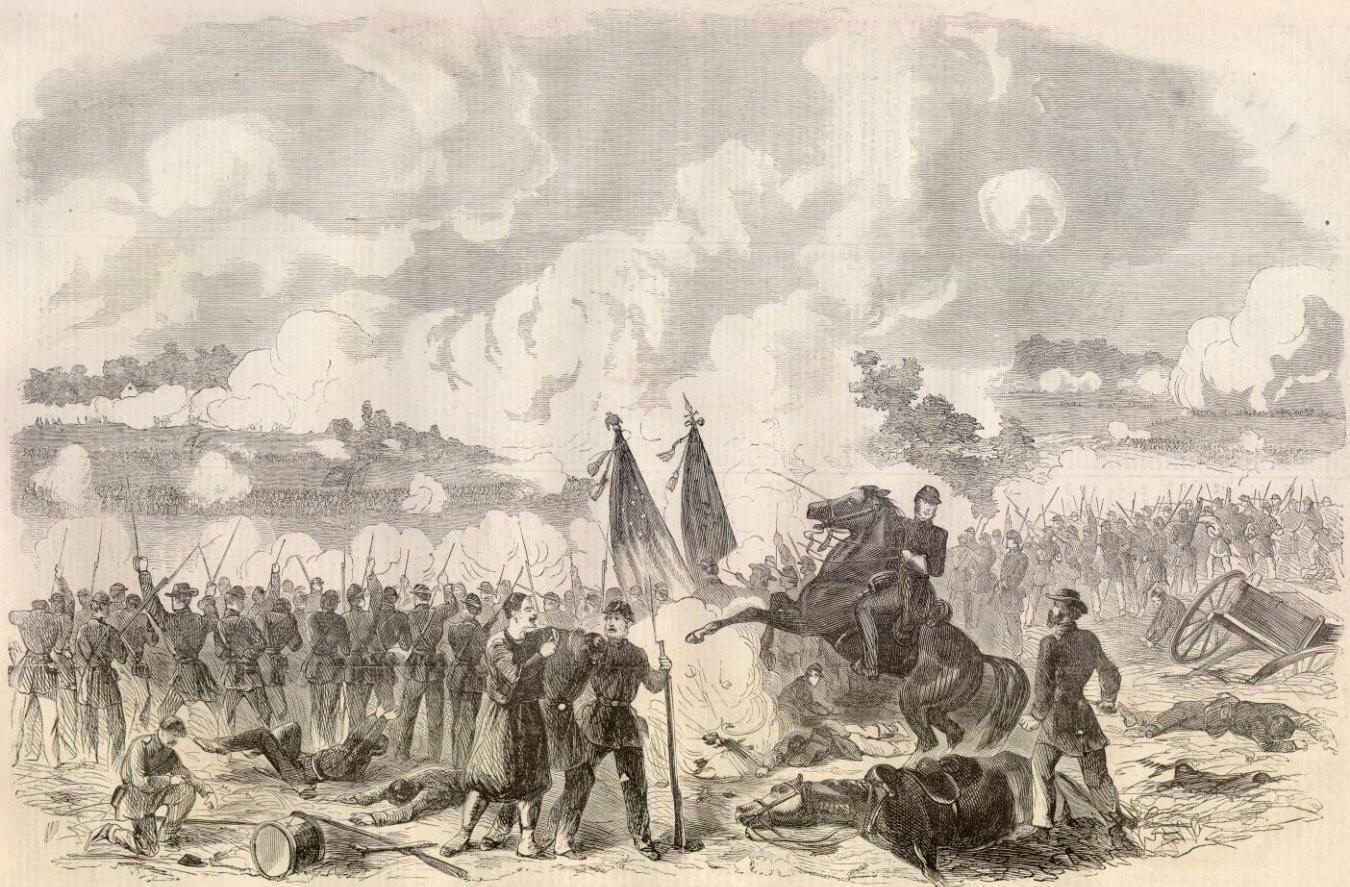
Battle of Friday on the Chickahominy Alfred R. Waud, artist, June 27, 1862. Newspaper illustration after the original sketch

The Seven Days Battles were a series of counteroffensive engagements in which Confederate General Robert E. Lee drove Union General George B. McClellan's Army of the Potomac away from Richmond, Virginia, ending the Union's Peninsula Campaign. McClellan's forces had advanced to the outskirts of Richmond, threatening the Confederate capital, but Lee launched aggressive counteroffensives to turn the tide. The campaign began with the Battle of Oak Grove on June 25, a minor Union attack that failed to gain ground, followed by Lee's first major assault at the Battle of Beaver Dam Creek on June 26, which resulted in heavy Confederate losses but forced McClellan to reconsider his position. Lee's strategy unfolded in the battle of Gaines' Mill (also known as the battle of Chickahominy River) on June 27, where a coordinated Confederate assault broke the Union right flank, compelling McClellan to retreat southward. Over the next several days, Lee pursued the Union army, engaging in the Battle of Savage's Station on June 29 and the battles at Glendale and at White Oak Swamp on June 30, where fierce fighting prevented Lee from cutting off McClellan's retreat. The campaign culminated in the Battle of Malvern Hill on July 1, where Union forces repelled repeated Confederate attacks with devastating artillery fire. Despite the Union victory at Malvern Hill, McClellan continued his retreat to the James River, effectively abandoning the campaign.

==== Northern Virginia campaign ====
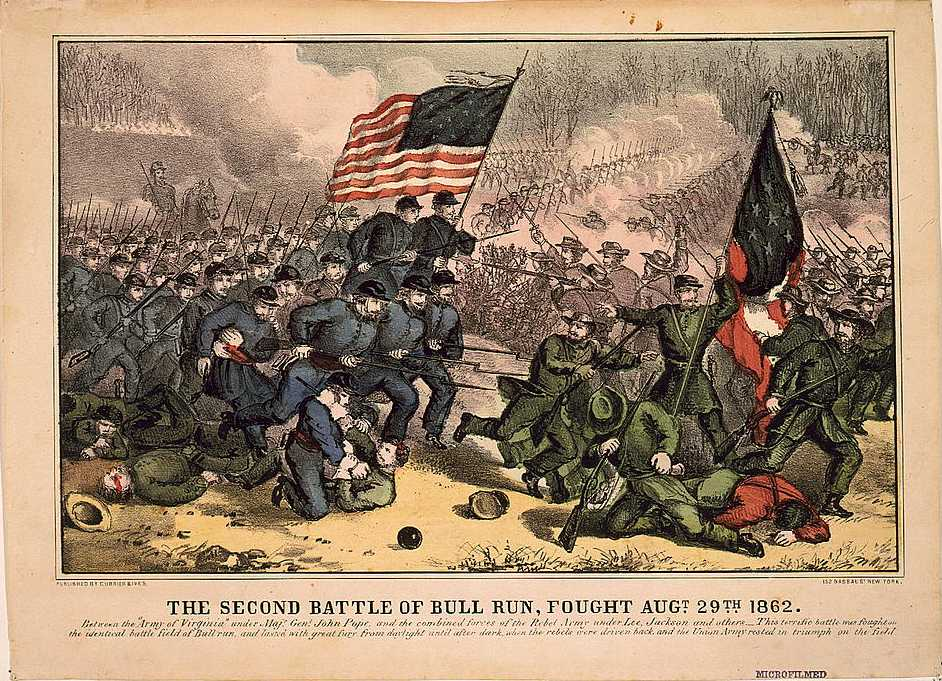
The Second Battle of Bull Run, fought Augt. 30th 1862, 1860s lithograph by Currier and Ives

The Northern Virginia campaign in August 1862, was a major Confederate offensive led by General Robert E. Lee aimed at driving Union forces under General John Pope away from central and northern Virginia. The campaign started with the Battle of Cedar Mountain on August 9, where Confederate General "Stonewall" Jackson defeated Union forces under General Nathaniel P. Banks, forcing Pope to consolidate his army near the Rappahannock River. For several days, both armies skirmished at the First Battle of Rappahannock Station (August 22–25), with no decisive outcome, as Lee maneuvered to flank Pope's army. Jackson executed a daring raid in the Battle of Manassas Station Operations (August 25–27), capturing Union supply depots at Manassas Junction, crippling Pope's logistics. Meanwhile, Lee's other corps under General James Longstreet forced its way through the Battle of Thoroughfare Gap on August 28, allowing the Confederate army to reunite. This set the stage for the Second Battle of Bull Run (Manassas) between August 28–30, where Jackson's forces held a strong defensive line while Longstreet launched a massive counterattack, crushing Pope's army and forcing a Union retreat toward Washington, D.C. As the Union army fell back, Lee pursued aggressively. The campaign concluded with the Battle of Chantilly on September 1, where Union forces under generals Philip Kearny and Isaac Stevens fought a desperate rearguard action but were ultimately forced to withdraw after both commanders were killed.

==== Confederate Heartland Offensive ====
A modern mural depicting the "Squirrel Hunters" crossing the Ohio River for the defense of Cincinnati

The Confederate Heartland Offensive (also known as the Kentucky Campaign) between April–October 1862, was a major Confederate invasion aimed at securing Kentucky and expanding Confederate control into the Union's heartland. The offensive began with the Great Locomotive Chase on April 12, a daring Union raid to disrupt Confederate railroads in Georgia that failed. Confederate General John Hunt Morgan's cavalry launched raids throughout Kentucky, including a victory at the Battle of Lebanon on May 5. General Braxton Bragg led another Confederate army into Tennessee, seizing the strategic Cumberland Gap and occupying the city of Chattanooga without a significant fight in early June. In August 1862, Confederate forces under General Edmund Kirby Smith advanced into eastern Kentucky, defeating Union troops at the Battle of Richmond (August 29–30), inflicting one of the Union's most lopsided defeats. Bragg advanced into central Kentucky, capturing Munfordville (September 14–17) after a strong Union defense, while Morgan's cavalry disrupted Union communications at Riggins Hill. At the Battle of Perryville on October 8, Bragg's forces clashed with Union General Don Carlos Buell's army. Though Bragg tactically won part of the field, he failed to achieve a decisive victory and retreated from Kentucky, abandoning hopes of securing the state. Meanwhile, Confederate forces launched a symbolic raid on Cincinnati in Ohio.

==== Maryland campaign ====
Depiction of the Battle of Antietam by Thure de Thulstrup

The Maryland campaign in September 1862 was Confederate General Robert E. Lee's first major invasion of the Union. The campaign began with a Confederate victory at the Battle of Mile Hill on September 2, where Confederate cavalry under Colonel Thomas T. Munford drove back Union forces near Leesburg, Virginia. As Lee's army moved into Maryland, he divided his forces, sending General "Stonewall" Jackson to capture the critical federal arsenal at Harpers Ferry, Virginia. After a three-day siege which ended on September 15, Jackson forced the surrender of over 12,000 Union troops, securing Lee's supply lines.

Meanwhile, Union General George B. McClellan pursued Lee, fighting with Confederate defenders at Crampton's Gap and at South Mountain on September 14. Despite strong resistance, Union forces secured both mountain passes, forcing Lee to consolidate his army near Sharpsburg, Maryland. On September 17, the Union forces under McClellan fought against Lee's army in the Battle of Antietam, the bloodiest single-day battle in American history, with over 22,000 casualties. The Union victory at Antietam halted Lee's invasion. After retreating across the Potomac River, Lee's rear guard fought a delaying action at the Battle of Shepherdstown (September 19–20), repelling Union forces and securing the Confederate withdrawal, formally ending Lee's invasion. During the Confederate withdrawal, J. E. B. Stuart's cavalry conducted a raid on Chambersburg, Pennsylvania (October 10–12), disrupting Union supply lines in Pennsylvania, followed by a raid on Unison, Virginia (October 31 – November 2).

==== Gettysburg campaign ====
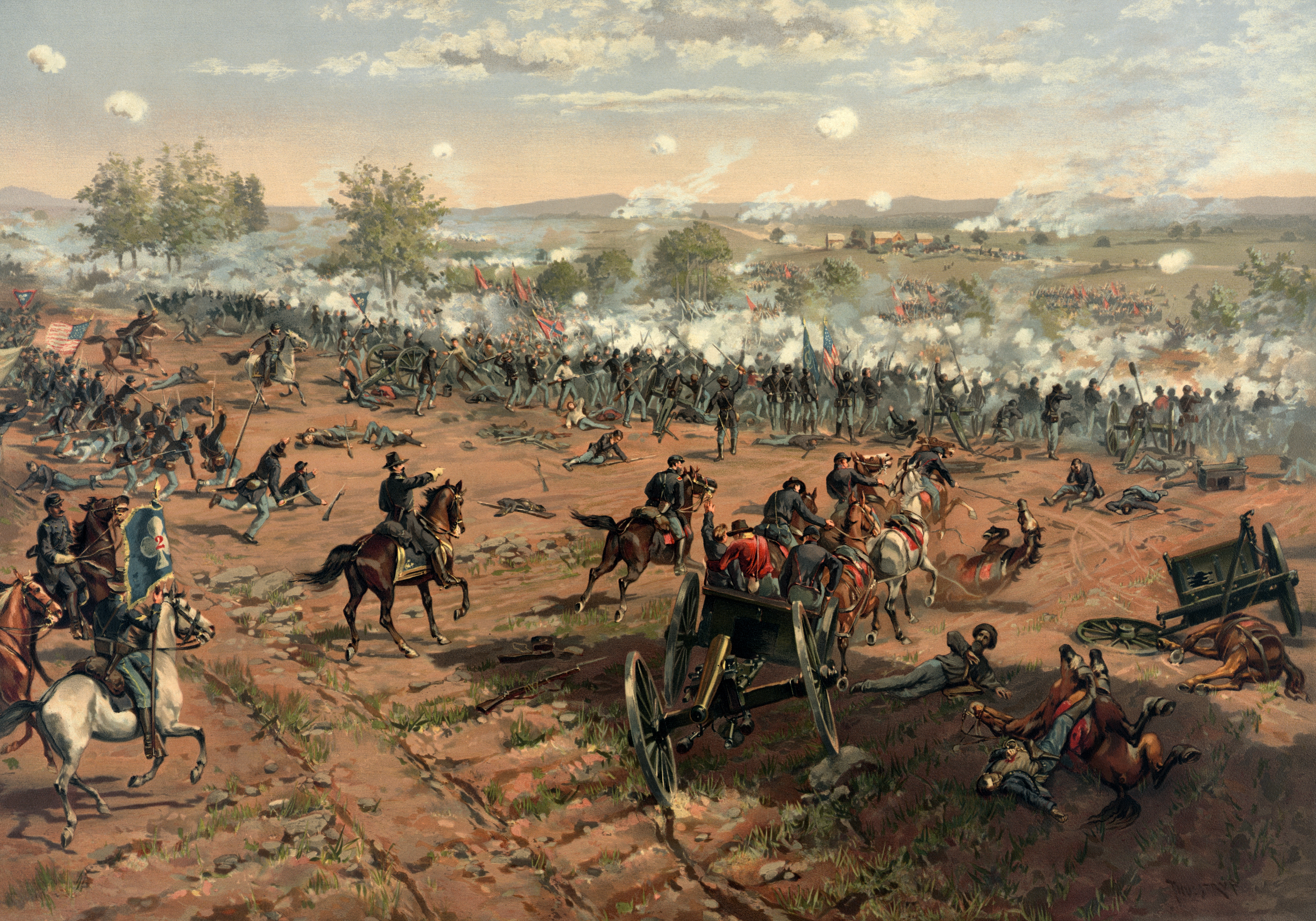
The Battle of Gettysburg

The Gettysburg campaign in June–July 1863, was Confederate General Robert E. Lee's second invasion of the North. The campaign opened with the Battle of Franklin's Crossing on June 5, where Union forces probed Confederate defenses near Fredericksburg, Virginia. As Lee's army advanced, Union cavalry clashed with Confederate horsemen at the Battle of Brandy Station on June 9, the largest cavalry engagement of the war, ending in a tactical draw but boosting Union cavalry confidence. Lee's forces then swept into the Shenandoah Valley, securing a decisive victory at the Second Battle of Winchester (June 13–15), capturing the town of Winchester, Virginia, and thousands of Union troops. As Confederate forces crossed into Pennsylvania, cavalry skirmishes erupted at Aldie, Virginia on June 17, at Middleburg, Virginia on June 19, and at Upperville on June 21, delaying Confederate advances and providing critical intelligence to Union General Joseph Hooker. Meanwhile, Confederate cavalry under Major General J.E.B. Stuart fought at Fairfax Court House on June 27 and at Corbit's Charge on June 29, where outnumbered Union troopers delayed the Confederate advance near Westminster, Maryland.

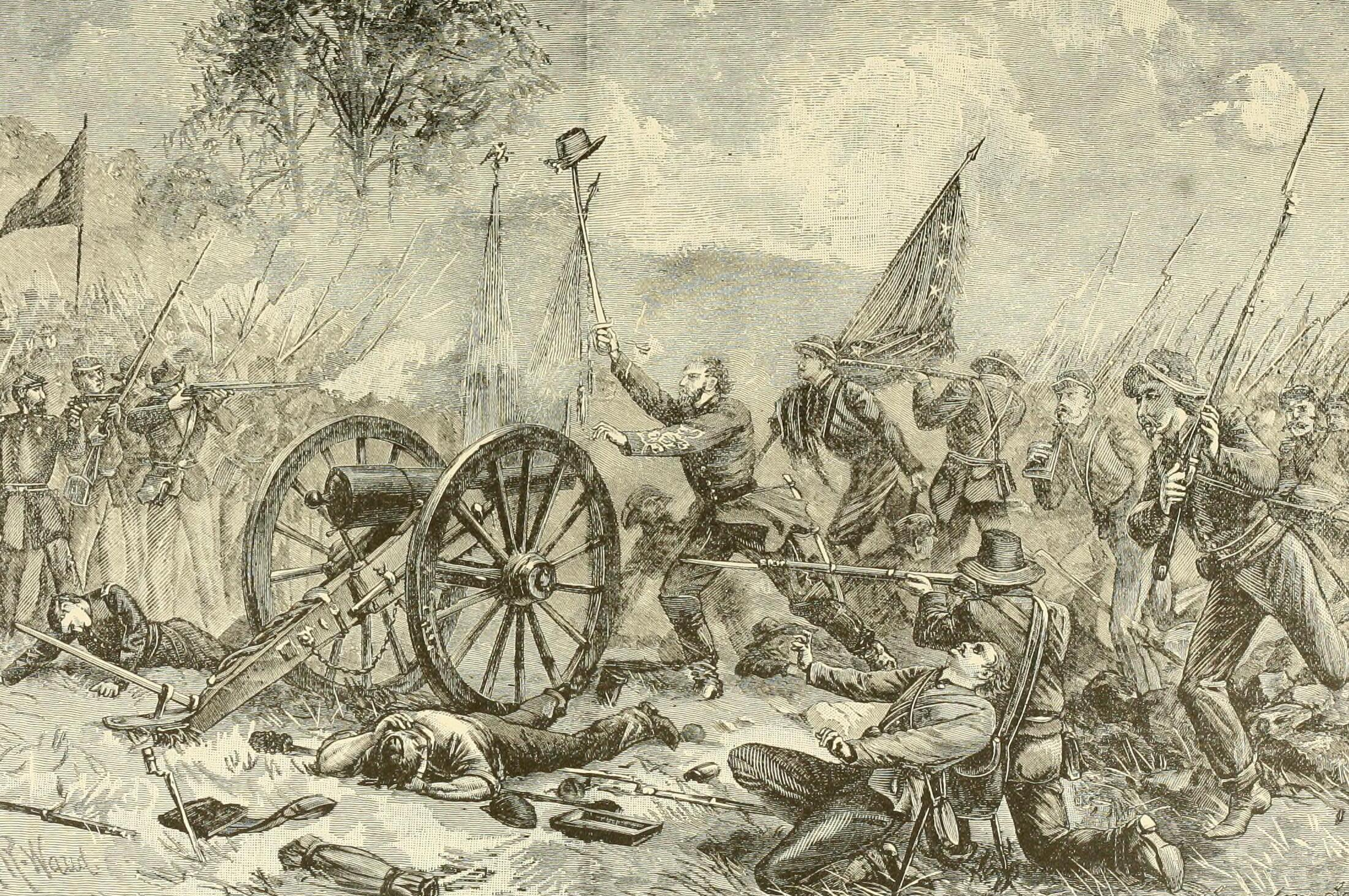
Pickett's Charge

As Lee's forces approached key Northern cities, they skirmished with Union militia at Hanover, Pennsylvania on June 30, at Sporting Hill on June 30, and at Carlisle, Pennsylvania on July 1, burning parts of Carlisle in retaliation for Union resistance. The campaign reached its turning point at the Battle of Gettysburg between July 1–3, where Lee's army suffered a crushing defeat after three days of intense fighting, culminating in Pickett's Charge. Lee retreated back to Virginia under heavy Union pursuit. The retreat from Gettysburg was marked by fierce rear-guard actions. Confederate forces defended key mountain passes at Fairfield, Pennsylvania on July 3, at Monterey Pass on July 4–5, and at Williamsport, Maryland (July 6–14), holding off Union forces while securing river crossings at the Potomac. Additional clashes at Boonsboro, Maryland on July 8, at Funkstown, Maryland on July 10, and at Manassas Gap in Virginia on July 23 ensured Lee's escape.

==== Morgan's Raid ====
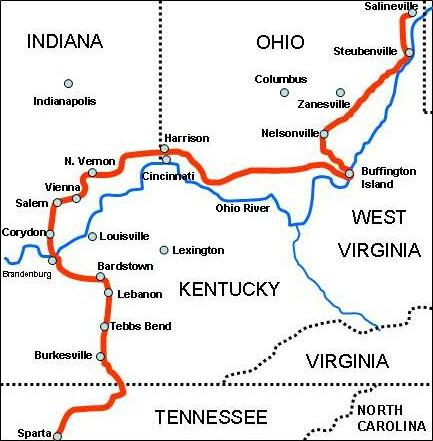
A map of Morgan's Raid route

Morgan's Raid (June–July 1863) was a Confederate cavalry operation led by General John Hunt Morgan, aimed at disrupting Union supply lines and spreading panic in the North. Starting in Tennessee, Morgan's force moved into Kentucky, clashing with Union troops at the Battle of Tebbs Bend on July 4, where they were repulsed but continued advancing. At the Battle of Lebanon, Kentucky on July 5, Morgan captured the town after fierce resistance but suffered heavy casualties, including the death of his brother. Crossing into Indiana, Morgan's men overwhelmed local militia at the Battle of Corydon on July 9, marking the only Civil War battle fought in Indiana. Pushing into Ohio, Morgan's exhausted force was intercepted at the Battle of Buffington Island on July 19, where Union troops under General Edward H. Hobson and gunboats dealt a crushing defeat, capturing hundreds of Confederates. Morgan and a small group managed to escape but were finally surrounded at the Battle of Salineville on July 26, where he and his remaining men were captured.

==== Battle of Chickamauga ====
The Battle of Chickamauga (September 19–20, 1863) was a major Confederate victory in northern Georgia, which ended the Chickamauga campaign, a Union invasion of Georgia. After Union General William Rosecrans forced Confederate General Braxton Bragg from the city of Chickamauga, Georgia, Bragg, reinforced by General James Longstreet, counterattacked near Chickamauga Creek. A Union miscommunication on September 20 created a gap in their line, allowing Longstreet to rout much of the Union army. Despite the collapse, Union General George Henry Thomas held Snodgrass Hill, enabling a Union retreat to Chattanooga, Tennessee and earning the nickname "Rock of Chickamauga."

==== Price's Missouri Expedition ====
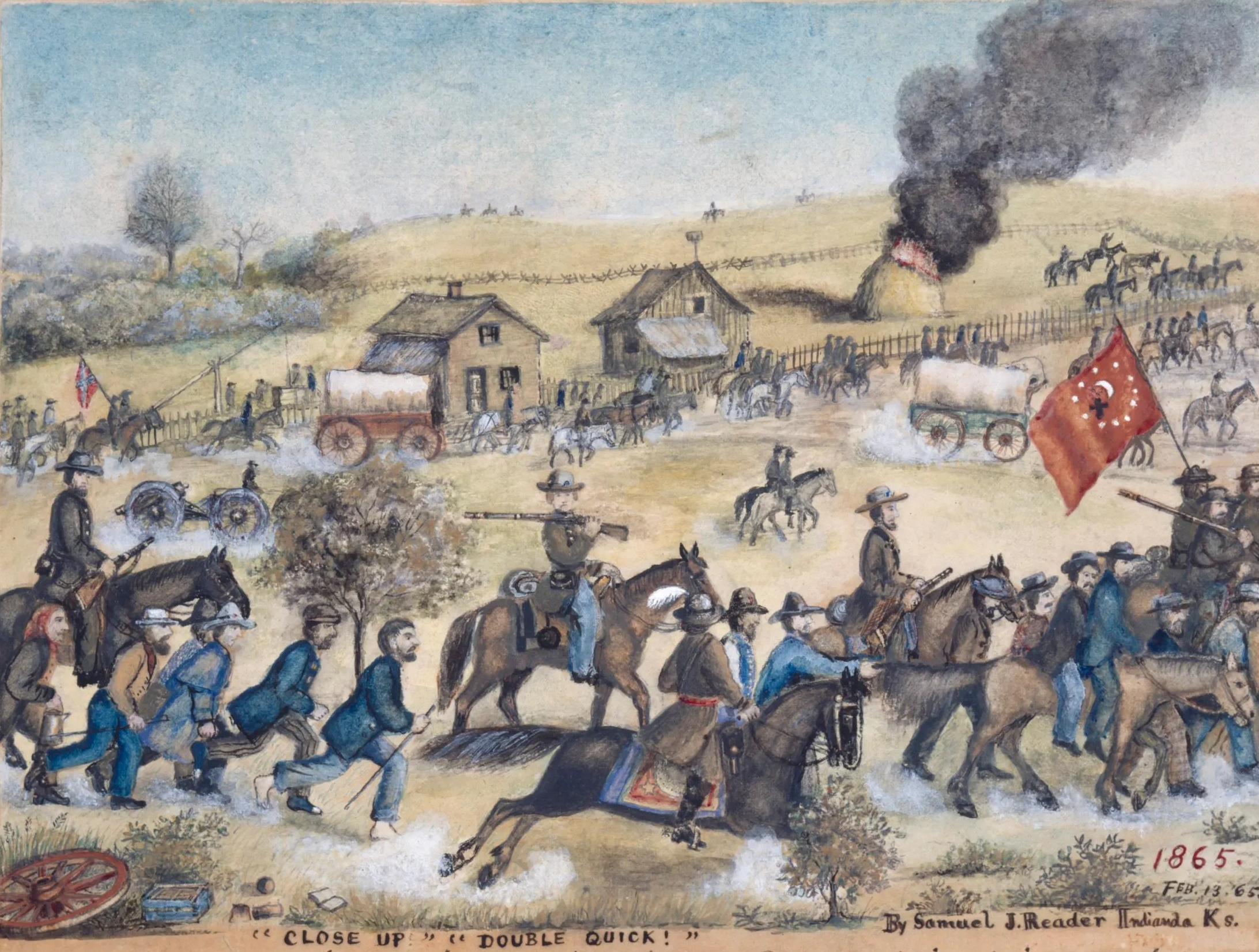
The Price Raid by Samuel J. Reader

Price's Missouri Expedition (September–October 1864) was a Confederate military campaign led by Major General Sterling Price, aiming to reclaim Missouri for the Confederacy, disrupt Union supply lines, and influence the 1864 U.S. presidential election. The campaign began with the Battle of Fort Davidson on September 27, where Price's forces won a costly victory but failed to destroy the fort's Union garrison, forcing him to continue his raid deeper into Missouri. Price advanced northward, capturing the town of Glasgow, Missouri on October 15 after a day of fighting, seizing much-needed supplies. He then moved west, engaging Union forces at Sedalia, Missouri and winning a minor skirmish. At the second battle of Lexington, Missouri on October 19, Price's army overwhelmed the Union garrison under the command of General James G. Blunt, opening the path toward Kansas City, Missouri. However, Price's advance was briefly halted at the Battle of Little Blue River on October 21, where Union forces mounted a strong resistance before retreating to fortified positions at Independence. The Second Battle of Independence on October 22 saw Price's forces take the town but at significant cost. Union forces launched a counteroffensive at Byram's Ford between October 22–23, forcing Price into a full-scale confrontation at the Battle of Westport on October 23, located in modern-day Kansas City. Outnumbered and outmaneuvered, Price's army suffered a decisive defeat, forcing a retreat southward. His retreat turned into a desperate running battle, with clashes at Marais des Cygnes and at Mine Creek on October 25, where Union cavalry captured hundreds of Confederate soldiers, including two Confederate generals. Price's battered army made a final stand at the battle of Marmiton River later in the day on October 25, but Union forces inflicted further losses. The expedition ended after the Second Battle of Newtonia on October 28, where Price's rear guard briefly held off pursuing Union troops before retreating into Arkansas.

==== Assassination of Abraham Lincoln ====
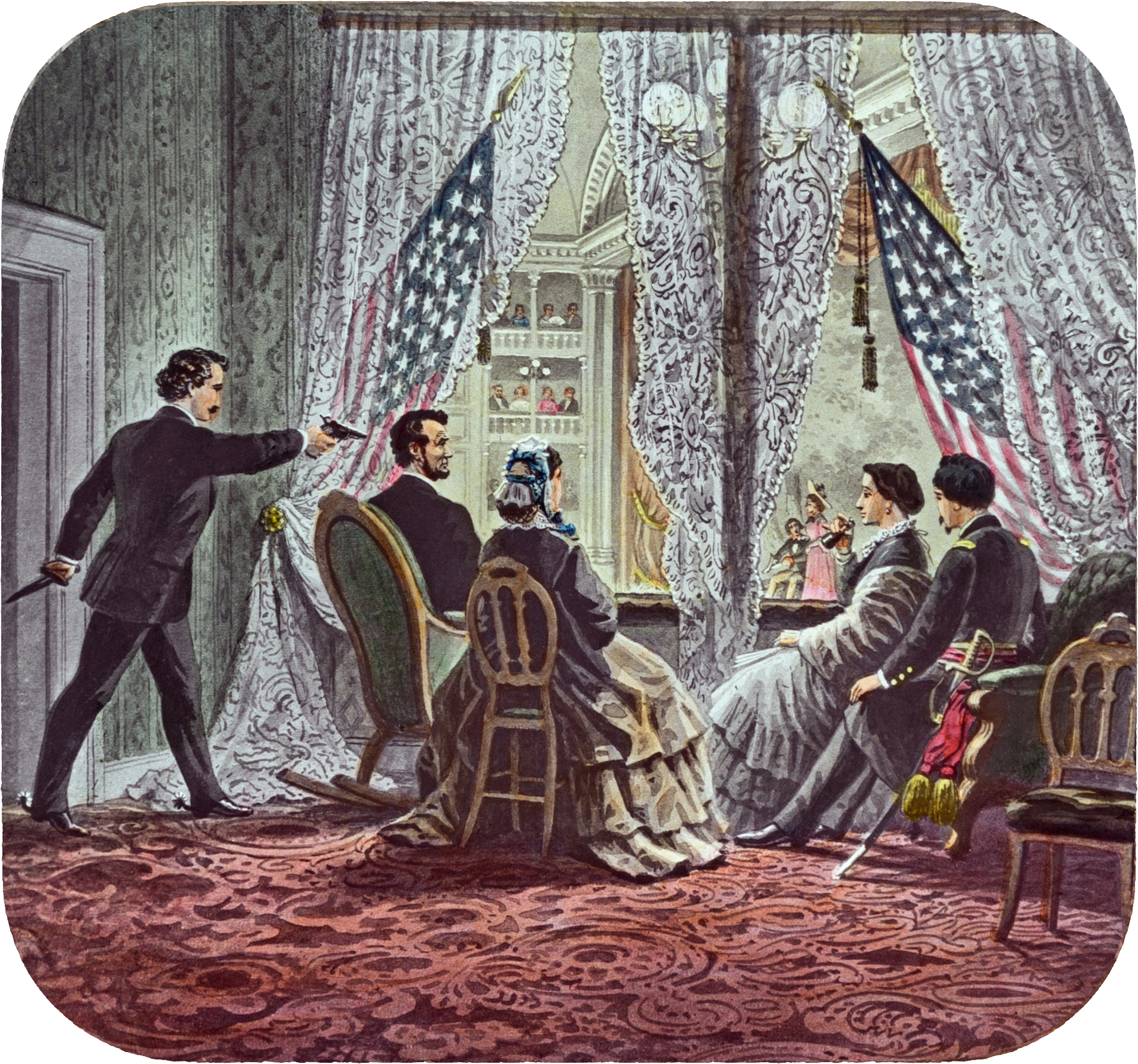
John Wilkes Booth assassinating Abraham Lincoln in Ford's Theatre. Drawing from glass-slide depiction c. 1865–75.

The assassination of Abraham Lincoln occurred on April 14, 1865, just days after the Civil War's end. John Wilkes Booth, a Confederate sympathizer, shot United States President Abraham Lincoln in the back of the head while he attended Our American Cousin at Ford's Theatre in Washington, D.C. Booth fled the scene, shouting "Sic semper tyrannis" and escaping despite breaking his leg. The assassination was part of a broader conspiracy targeting top U.S. officials. Secretary of State William H. Seward was severely wounded in an attack, while Vice President Andrew Johnson's would-be assassin failed. Lincoln died the following morning, plunging the nation into mourning. Booth was killed 12 days later, and the surviving conspirators were captured, tried, and executed.

=== Expedition to Korea (June–July 1871) ===
The United States expedition to Korea in 1871, known as the Shinmiyangyo in Korea, aimed to secure trade, diplomatic ties, and protect shipwrecked sailors after the General Sherman incident. The American expedition consisted of about 650 men, more than 500 sailors and 100 Marines, as well as five warships: Colorado, Alaska, Palos, Monocacy, and Benicia. Embarked aboard Colorado was Rear Admiral John Rodgers, and Frederick F. Low, the United States Ambassador to China. On June 1, Korean forces fired at the unprovoking U.S. fleet as it sailed up the Ganghwa Straits near Ganghwa Island. Following being fired upon, Rear Admiral John Rodgers launched a military assault against the Korean forces. In the Battle of Ganghwa between June 10–11, U.S. Marines and sailors captured key Korean forts, including Fort Seonghwan, despite fierce resistance led by General Eo Jae-yeon. The Americans secured a military victory but failed to achieve diplomatic concessions as Korea maintained its isolationist stance. This changed with the Joseon–United States Treaty of 1882, Korea's first treaty with a Western power. It established trade relations, recognized Korean sovereignty, and ensured mutual protection for shipwrecked sailors.

=== Spanish–American War (February 1898 – August 1898) ===
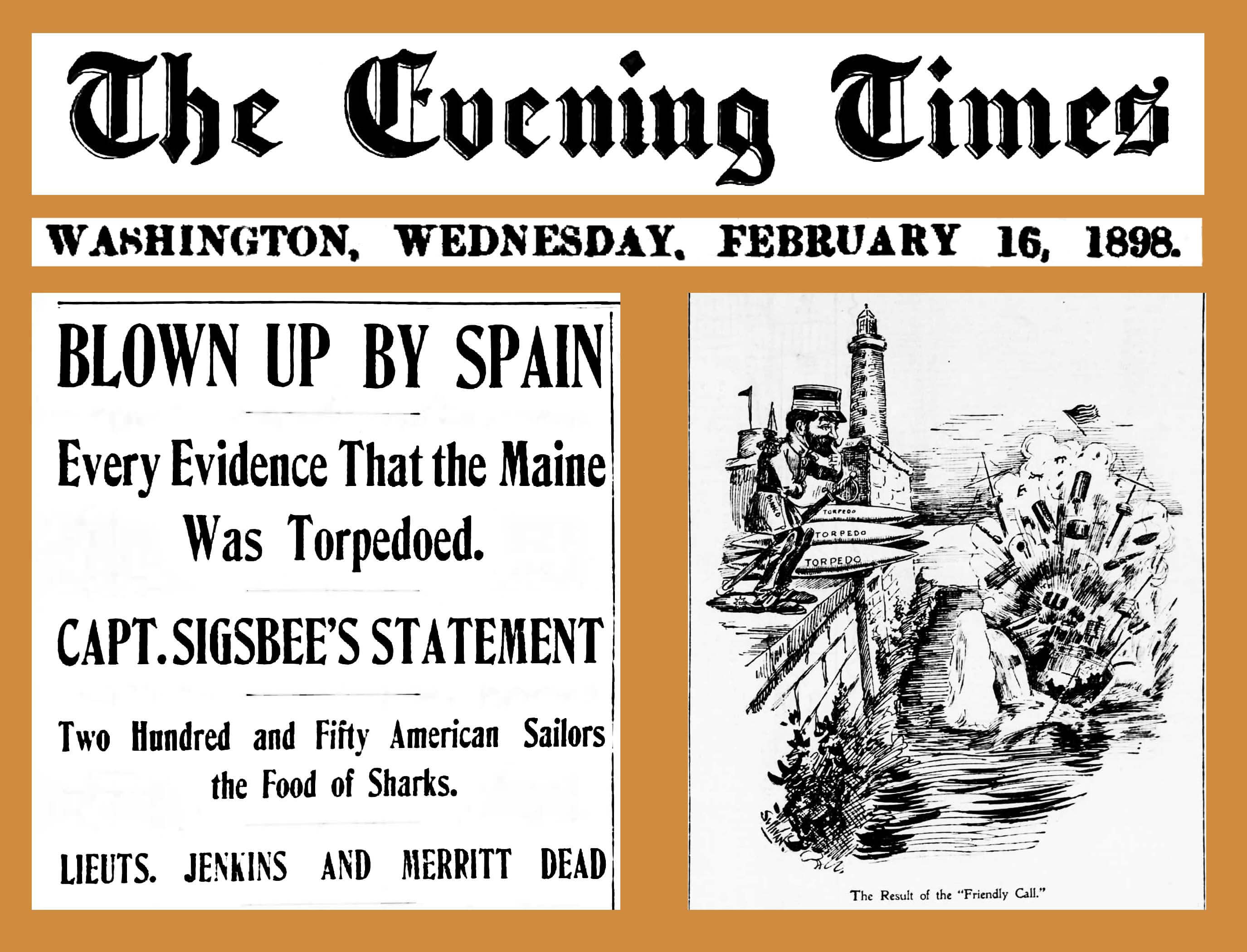
The headline and image of The Evening Times in Washington, D.C. reporting sinking of the USS Maine on February 16, 1898

The Sinking of the USS Maine on February 15, 1898, was a key event that preluded the Spanish–American War. The USS Maine, a United States Navy battleship, had been sent to Havana Harbor, Cuba, to protect American interests during a period of intense unrest as Cuban rebels fought for independence from the Spanish Empire. While anchored in the harbor, a massive explosion tore through the ship, killing 261 of its 355 crew members. The cause of the explosion was unclear at the time, but sensationalist U.S. newspapers, led by William Randolph Hearst's New York Journal and Joseph Pulitzer's New York World, blamed Spain for the destruction of the USS Maine, fueling public outrage. The rallying cry "Remember the Maine! To Hell with Spain!" swept across the United States, pressuring the American government to take action. Although a naval investigation initially concluded that a mine caused the explosion, later investigations suggested that an internal fire in a coal bunker may have triggered the blast.

== 1946–1999 ==
=== May 24 incident (1957) ===
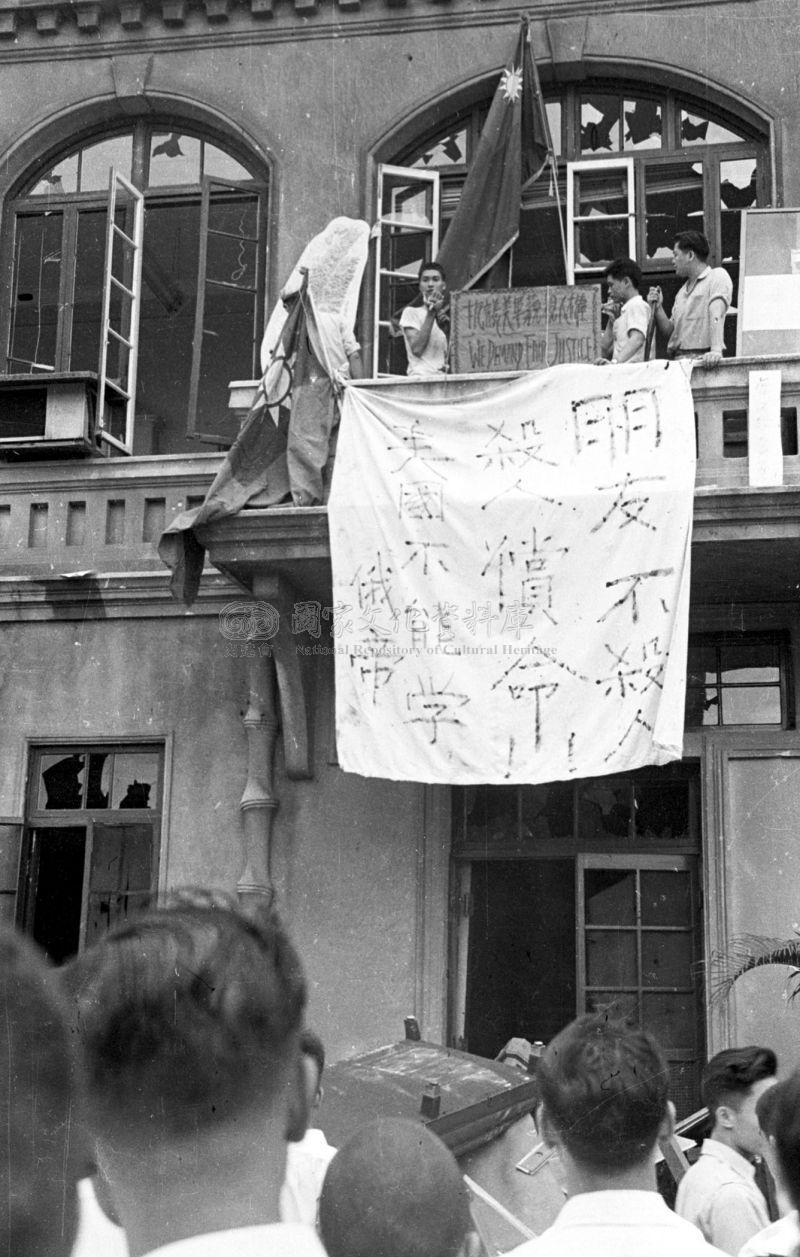
Crowds gathered and attacked the U.S. embassy on May 24. The label reads, "Friends shall note kill (to their friends)! A murderer shall pay with his life! The United States shall not learn from Soviet imperialism."

On May 24, 1957, riots and mob attacks occurred at the then-American embassy in Taipei, Taiwan. The riots and mob attacks started over the killing of an ROC national by an American military officer and the subsequent acquitted court-martial conducted by U.S. military personnel in Taiwan. On March 20, 1957, U.S. Sgt. Robert G. Reynolds, confronted Liu Ziran, purportedly a Republic of China Army Major and staff member at the Institute of Revolutionary Practice in Taiwan, outside Reynolds' home. Reynolds claimed that Liu had been peeping through the bathroom window while his wife took a bath. According to Reynolds, Liu approached him with a long object and Reynolds fired two shots at Liu, killing him. Investigations by the U.S. and ROC led to the conclusion that Reynolds lied and should be charged with involuntary manslaughter. On May 20, 1957, a U.S. military court-martial convened in Taipei, and on May 23, the jury acquitted Reynolds of all charges. The not-guilty verdict angered ROC citizens who viewed the trial as rigged and could not understand how a person could kill another and not receive some type of punishment. Taiwanese were also outraged that an American could claim self-defense in a situation in which there was no evidence that Liu possessed any weapon.

On May 24, a mob of at least 6,000 gathered outside the embassy, chanting anti-American slogans and demanding justice for Liu. In the afternoon, waves of rioters entered the embassy doing damage including smashing vehicles and furniture and destroying the American flag. Eight Americans hiding in a basement bomb shelter were driven out, some with serious injuries. Separately, a mob surrounded the Sugar Building, headquarters for MAAG-Taiwan, while another mob wrecked two USIS buildings. Eventually, protesters surrounded the Taipei Municipal Police building and wreaked destruction. When a police officer was shot, other officers opened fire on the mob. Although the ROC government ordered military forces into Taipei to restore order, rioters continued to do damage to the embassy into the evening. By the end of what became known as Black Friday, 11 Americans, 62 police officers, and 11 rioters were injured and 1 rioter was dead. The police arrested 111. The damage to the U.S. Embassy and USIS buildings totaled over $500,000 (equivalent to $5.7 million in 2025).

=== Embassy in Ankara bombing (January 1958) ===
At 12:00 am local time on January 27, 1958, a bomb went off at a warehouse inside the U.S. Embassy compound. A second bomb went off and destroyed the nearby American Publication Stores private bookshop. The United States released later that day it was believed both bombs were thrown from cars passing the Embassy compound. The Associated Press and The New York Times jointly published that the bombing was attempting to tarnish America's prestige before the opening of the Baghdad Pact Conference later that day.

=== U-2 incident (May 1960) ===
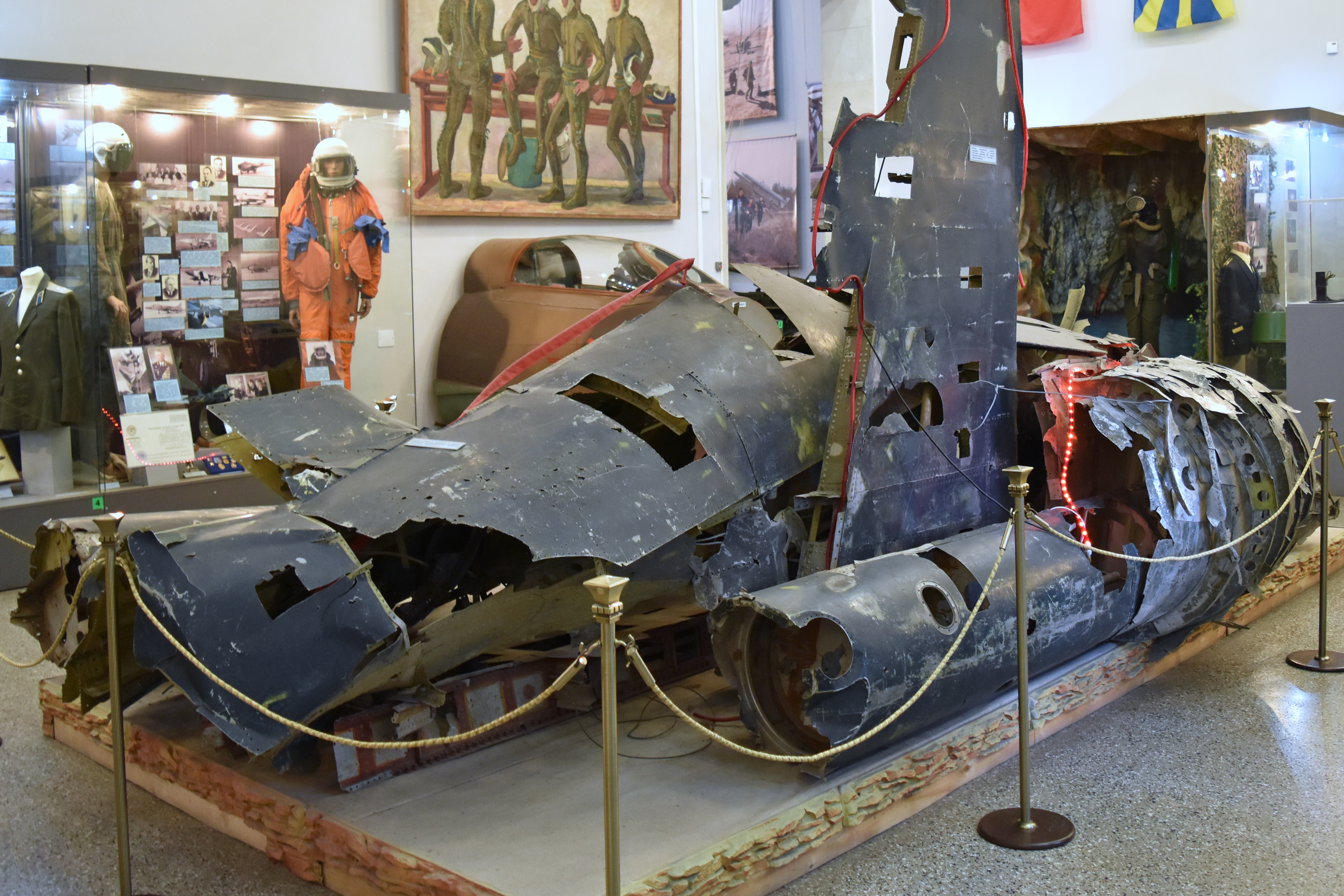
The wreckage of the American Lockheed U-2 on display at the Central Armed Forces Museum in Moscow

On May 1, 1960, an American U-2 spy plane was shot down by the Soviet Air Defence Forces while conducting photographic aerial reconnaissance deep inside Soviet territory. Flown by American pilot Francis Gary Powers, the aircraft had taken off from Peshawar, Pakistan, and crashed near Sverdlovsk (present-day Yekaterinburg), after being hit by a surface-to-air missile. Powers parachuted to the ground and was captured. Initially, American authorities acknowledged the incident as the loss of a civilian weather research aircraft operated by NASA, but were forced to admit the mission's true purpose a few days later after the Soviet government produced the captured pilot and parts of the U-2's surveillance equipment, including photographs of Soviet military bases.

The incident occurred during the tenures of American president Dwight D. Eisenhower and Soviet leader Nikita Khrushchev, around two weeks before the scheduled opening of an east–west summit in Paris, France. Khrushchev and Eisenhower had met face-to-face at Camp David in Maryland in September 1959, and the seeming thaw in U.S.-Soviet relations had raised hopes globally for a peaceful resolution to the Cold War. The U-2 incident shattered the amiable "Spirit of Camp David" that had prevailed for eight months, prompting the cancellation of the summit in Paris and embarrassing the U.S. on the international stage. The Pakistani government issued a formal apology to the Soviet Union for its role in the mission. Following his capture, Powers was convicted of espionage and sentenced to three years of imprisonment plus seven years of hard labour; he was released two years later, in February 1962, in a prisoner exchange for Soviet intelligence officer Rudolf Abel.

=== Embassy in Libreville bombings (March 1964) ===
Two weeks after a failed coup d'état which the U.S. was mistakenly blamed for, on March 5, 1964, a small bomb detonated outside the embassy compound, damaging a sign and cracking windows. Following the bombing, it was believed that the French government conducted the bombing. Three days later on March 8, a second bombing on the embassy in Gabon was conducted by France. The French bombers also fired on the embassy with a shotgun, causing minor damage. The New York Times reported the embassy "looked as if it had been raked by machine‐gun fire."

=== Vietnam War (August 1964 – March 1973) ===
==== Attack on the embassy in Moscow ====
Protests in front of the embassy related to the Vietnam War turned into rioting, approximately 2000 students had to be cleared away by the Red Army.

==== 1965 Saigon bombing ====
On 25 June 1965, during the Vietnam War, the Viet Cong exploded two bombs in Saigon killing 31 people. The first bomb detonated at 8:15 p.m. (local time) in a floating restaurant "My Canh Café" at Bạch Đằng Quay on the bank of the Saigon River. Moments after the first blast, another bomb exploded on the riverbank as the survivors fled the restaurant. Eight American servicemen were killed in the blast and a further twelve were injured.

==== Attack on the embassy in Phnom Penh ====
Attack on embassy softball game.

==== 1972 attack in Manila ====
Attack by communist group, Marine guard wounded.

=== Assassination of Rodger Davies (August 1974) ===
Riot outside US embassy in Cyprus; ambassador Rodger Davies and assistant shot by sniper on August 19, 1974.

=== November 1974 attacks in Japan (November 1974) ===
Date(s)	Location	Type of attack	Details	U.S. Deaths
November 14, 1974	Tokyo, Japan	Attack	Several Japanese youth attacked the embassy with Molotov cocktails, throwing them from a nearby hotel. Afterwards, five stormed the compound where they were arrested. Seven local guards were injured.	0
November 22, 1974	Fukuoka, Japan	Attack	Three men wearing red helmets from the Marxist Youth League broke windows and threw an explosive device at the Consulate. The men then attacked and injured a consulate employee.	0

=== AIA building hostage crisis (August 1975) ===
Japanese Red Army gunmen stormed the AIA building, containing both the US and Swedish embassies, and took 53 hostages.

=== Shooting at the Embassy in Caracas (February 1976) ===
On February 17, 1976, gunmen in a car fire at the embassy causing minimal damage.

=== Iran hostage crisis (November 1979 – January 1981) ===
During the aftermath of the Iranian revolution, 53 American citizens and diplomats were held hostage by a group of armed Iranian college students who took over the United States' Embassy in Tehran. This led to the termination of Iran–United States relations and sanctions until the hostages were released in January 1981.

=== Embassy burning in Islamabad (November 1979) ===
During the rise of Wahhabism in Pakistan, a large mob of Pakistani citizens violently stormed the Embassy of the United States in Islamabad and subsequently burned it down in a coordinated attack on 21 November 1979.

=== Embassy burning in Libya (December 1979) ===
Protesters burned down the U.S. embassy on 2 December 1979, after allegations rose up of the United States being involved in the Grand Mosque seizure in Mecca, Saudi Arabia. This led to the US withdrawing all remaining U.S. government personnel in Libya.

=== 1983 US embassy bombing in Beirut ===
The April 18, 1983, United States Embassy bombing was a suicide bombing on the Embassy of the United States in Beirut, Lebanon, that killed 32 Lebanese, 17 Americans, and 14 visitors and passers-by. The victims were mostly embassy and CIA staff members, but also included several US soldiers and one U.S. Marine Security Guard. The attack came in the wake of an intervention in the Lebanese Civil War by the United States and other Western countries and were carried out by Hezbollah, but Hezbollah denied responsibility. It was the deadliest attack on a U.S. diplomatic mission up to that time, and was considered the beginning of Islamist attacks on U.S. targets.

=== 1983 Beirut barracks bombings ===
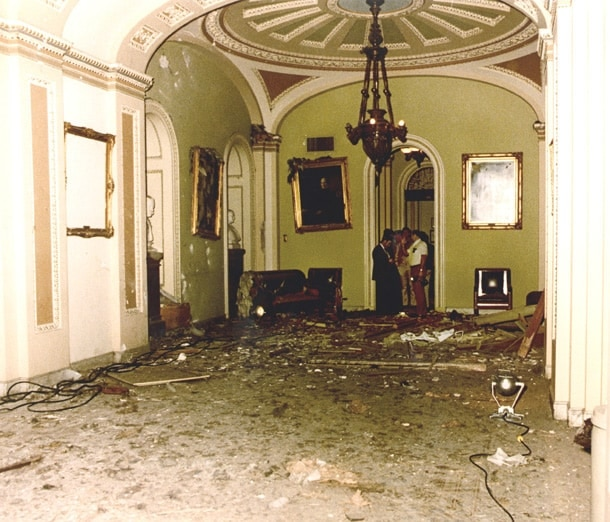
Bombing outside of the Chamber of the United States Senate

=== United States Senate bombing (November 1983) ===
On November 7, 1983, a bomb exploded in the Capitol's north wing near the Senate chamber in Washington, D.C. The blast caused significant damage to the area but resulted in no casualties, as the building was empty at the time. The bombing was later claimed by the "Armed Resistance Unit," a militant group opposed to U.S. military involvement in Grenada and Lebanon.

The attackers placed the device as a political statement, citing opposition to U.S. foreign policy. In 1988, six members of the radical group were arrested and convicted for their involvement in the bombing and other related activities.

=== 1984 Rajneeshee bioterror attack ===
In 1984, 751 people suffered food poisoning in The Dalles, Oregon, United States, due to the deliberate contamination of salad bars at ten local restaurants with Salmonella. A group of prominent followers of Rajneesh (later known as Osho) led by Ma Anand Sheela had hoped to incapacitate the voting population of the city so that their own candidates would win the 1984 Wasco County elections. The incident was the first and is still the single largest bioterrorist attack in U.S. history.

=== Embassy in Bogotá first bombing (November 1984) ===
On November 26, 1984, a car bomb planted by a drug cartel, exploded outside of the American embassy in Bogotá, killing one and reportedly injuring five others.

=== Embassy in Lisbon bombing (February 1986) ===
On February 19, 1986, the Popular Forces of 25 April a bomb exploded in a diplomat's car outside the American embassy in Lisbon. The bomb was discovered by Portuguese guards and no fatalities were reported.

=== Embassy in Jakarta bombing (May 1986) ===
On May 14, 1986, Japanese Red Army members attempt a mortar attack; their mortar shells failed to detonate.

=== Embassy in Rome bombing (June 1987) ===
On June 9, 1987, Car bomb set off, two rocket-propelled grenades fired at embassy.

=== Embassy in Bogotá second bombing (September 1989) ===
On September 17, 1989, a homemade rocket was fired at the embassy by an unknown assailant; no damage was reported.

=== World Trade Center bombing (February 1993) ===
On February 26, 1993, a terrorist bombing targeted the North Tower of the World Trade Center in New York City. A 1,200-pound (540 kg) truck bomb was detonated in the underground parking garage, causing a massive explosion that killed six people and injured over 1,000. The blast created a 100-foot (30 m) crater, severely damaging multiple floors but failing to topple the towers, which was the attackers' intended goal.

The attack was carried out by a group of Islamist extremists, including Ramzi Yousef, who orchestrated the plot, and several accomplices. They aimed to protest U.S. foreign policies in the Middle East. Authorities apprehended and convicted six individuals in connection with the bombing, including Yousef, who was later sentenced to life in prison.

=== Embassy in Lima bombing (July 1993) ===
On July 27, 1993, a car bomb planted by Shining Path targeted the American embassy in Lima, Peru, causing significant damage to embassy building.

=== Oklahoma City bombing (April 1995) ===
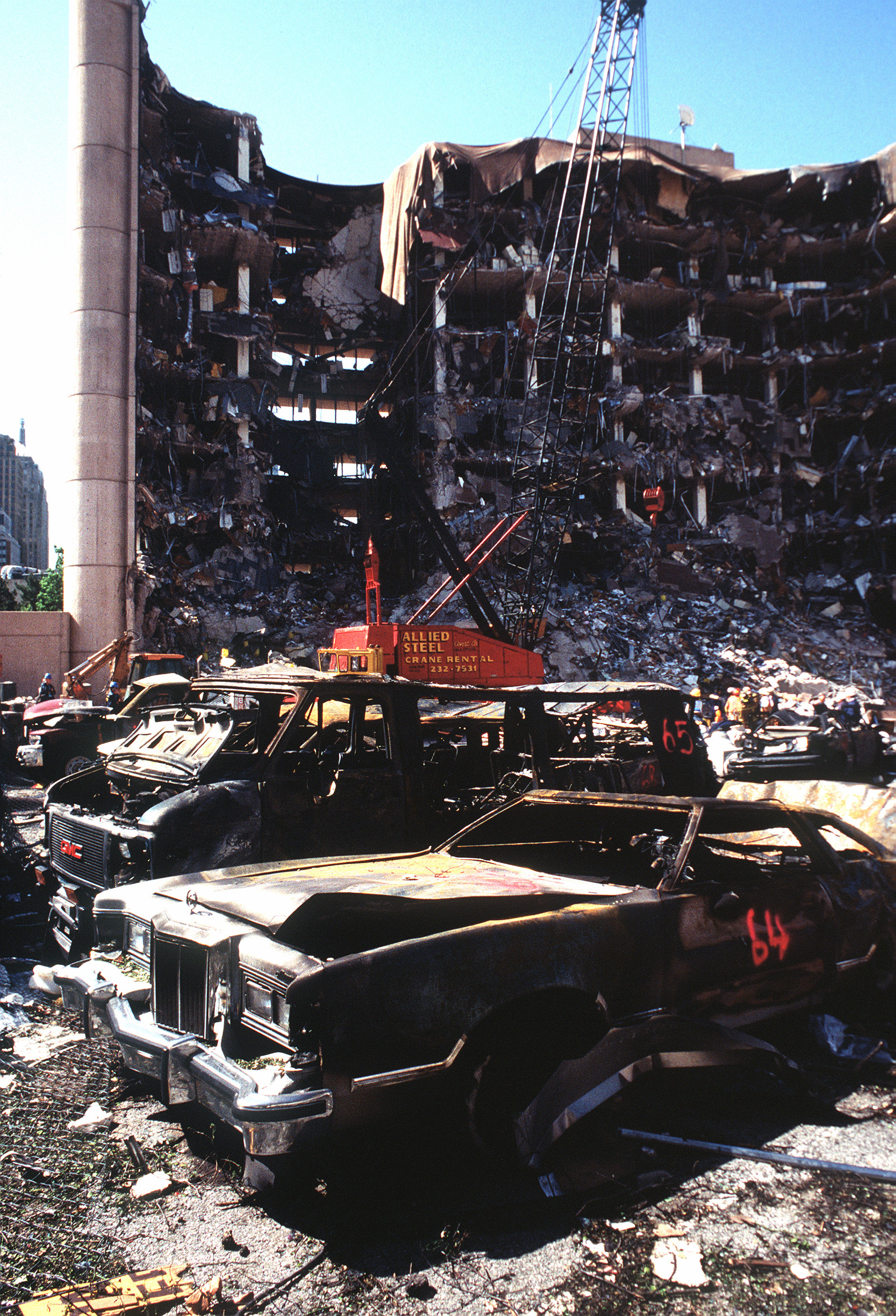
The Alfred P. Murrah Federal Building two days after the bombing, viewed from across the adjacent parking lot

A domestic terrorist truck bombing on April 19, 1995, targeting the Alfred P. Murrah Federal Building in Oklahoma City, Oklahoma. Orchestrated by Timothy McVeigh and Terry Nichols, the attack killed 168 people, including 19 children, and injured over 680 others, marking it as the deadliest act of domestic terrorism in U.S. history at the time. Motivated by anti-government sentiment, McVeigh used a truck loaded with explosives. Both perpetrators were arrested, tried, and convicted; McVeigh was executed in 2001.

=== Embassy in Moscow rocket attack (September 1995) ===
On September 13, 1995, rocket-propelled grenade (RPG) fired on embassy by unknown assailant.

=== Attacks on embassy in Monrovia (April 1996) ===
On April 11th, 1996, armed Liberians attempted to occupy the American embassy in Monrovia, entering its grounds and exchanging fire with elements of JSOC before retreating from the premises. No casualties were reported.

Later the same month, on April 30th, 1996, several unidentified Liberian rebels fired upon the American embassy in Liberia. In response, U.S Marines returned fire and were confirmed to have killed two assailants in addition to injuring one.

A second exchange of fire commenced two hours later, with six Liberian assailants opening fire on Marines stationed at a guard post in the exterior of the embassy. U.S Marines returned fire and killed one assailant.

=== Embassy in Beirut bombing (June 1998) ===
On June 21, 1998, RPGs fired at embassy by Hezbollah.

=== Attack on embassy in Monrovia (September 1998) ===
On September 19, 1998, Liberian security forces opened fire on a Liberian militia commander Roosevelt Johnson, who was speaking with U.S. officials at the embassy gate and subsequently laid siege to the building, killing or wounding more than 10 people. An embassy staff member and a government contractor were among the wounded.

=== Attempted rocket attack on embassy in Moscow (March 1999) ===
On March 28, 1999, during an anti-American demonstration in relation to the Kosovo War, two unidentified masked individuals aimed two RPG7-styled weapons towards the American embassy in Moscow from an adjacent street. However, no rockets were launched and instead one of the gunmen began discharging an automatic rifle, striking the embassy multiple times. Soon after, Russian police exchanged fire with the armed individuals, who fled in a stolen police SUV. No casualties were reported.
