= Embassy of Lebanon, Washington, D.C. =

Embassy of Lebanon (Washington, D.C.)
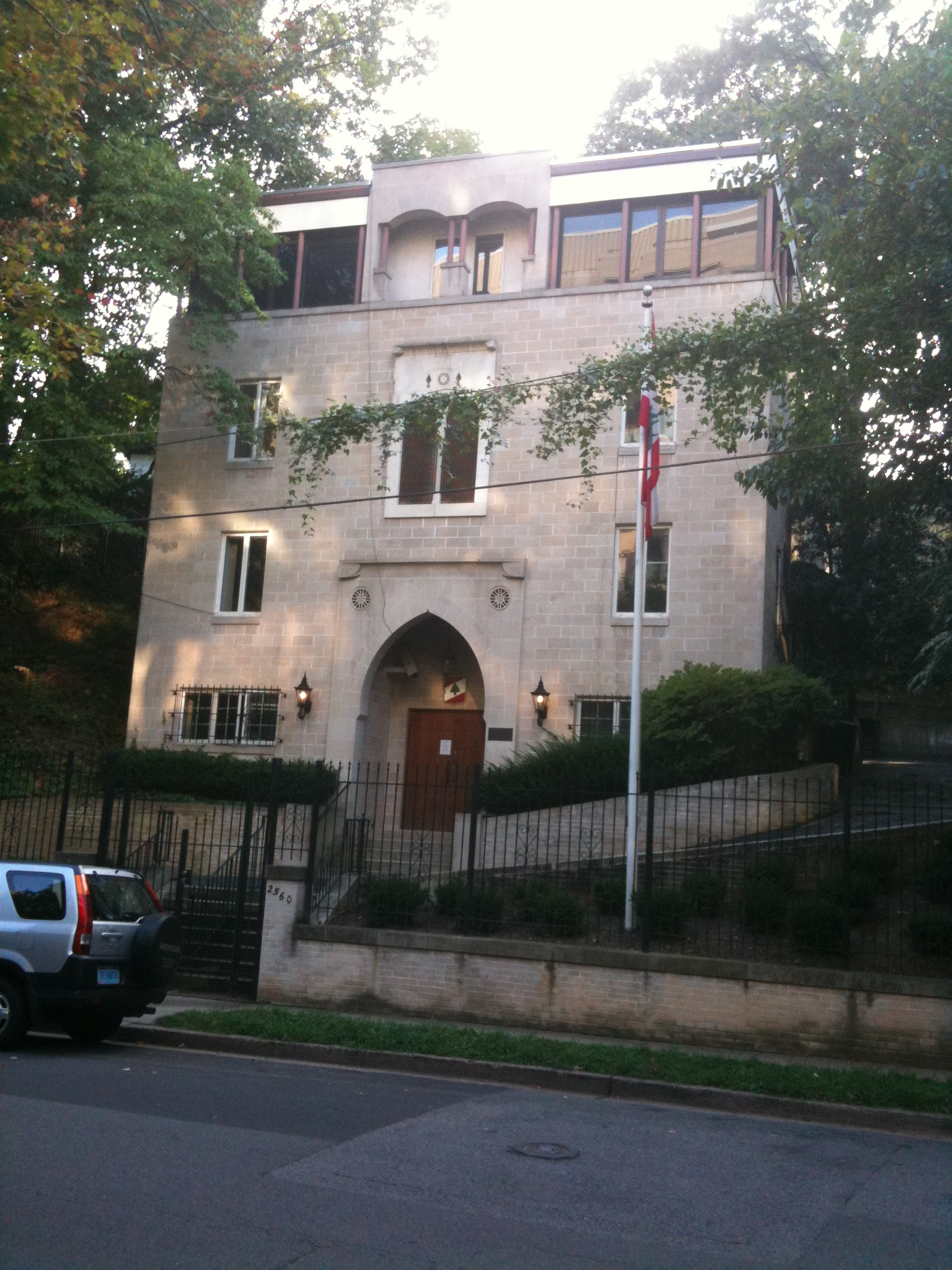
- Location: Washington, D.C.
- Address: 2560 28th Street NW
- Coordinates: 38°55′21″N 77°3′22″W
- Ambassador: Nada Hamadeh
- Website: Embassy of Lebanon - Washington, D.C.

The Embassy of Lebanon in Washington, D.C. is the Republic of Lebanon's diplomatic mission to the United States. It is located at 2560 28th Street, Northwest, Washington, D.C., in the Woodley Park neighborhood.

The embassy also operates Consulates-General in Los Angeles, Detroit, and New York City.

The chief of mission is Ambassador Nada Hamadeh.
