= Harold B. Minor =

American diplomat (1902–1984)

Ambassador of the United States of America to Lebanon
- In office October 15, 1952 – August 10, 1953

Personal details
- Born: February 1, 1902 Holton, Kansas, U.S.
- Died: January 26, 1984 (aged 81)
- Children: 3
- Education: Georgetown University

Harold Bronk Minor, known as Harold B. Minor, (1902–1984) was an American diplomat and was the first ambassador of the United States of America to Lebanon which he held between 1952 and 1953.

== Biography ==
Minor was born in Holton, Jackson County, Kansas, on 1 February 1902. He received a degree from Georgetown University in 1927 and started his career as a diplomat.

Minor served as the vice consul in Rio de Janeiro, Brazil, in 1932. He was named as a consul to Jerusalem, Palestine, in 1936 which he held until 1938. Next he became a consul in Iran in 1940. He was appointed envoy to Lebanon on September 19, 1951, and remained in office until October 15, 1952, when he was promoted to ambassador to Lebanon. He was the first ambassador of the United States of America to the country. His tenure ended on August 10, 1953.

Following the end of his diplomatic service Minor served as a member of the government relations department of the Arabian American Oil Company, precursor of the Saudi Aramco. He was elected as the director of the American Friends of the Middle East in April 1955.

Minor was married and had three children, a daughter and two sons. He died of heart attack on January 26, 1984.
